= List of high schools in the Cincinnati metropolitan area =

The Greater Cincinnati area consists of many public school districts, most of which contain one or more high school. There are also a number of Catholic high schools, many of which are single-sex, along with many other private schools (which are generally co-ed).

== Cincinnati Public Schools ==
The Cincinnati Public Schools district serves the city of Cincinnati (along with select areas outside of city limits). Cincinnati Public Schools includes 18 high schools, each accepting students on a citywide basis.

- Aiken High School
- Clark Montessori High School
- Dater High School
- Gamble Montessori High School
- Hughes Center High School
- Oyler School
- School for Creative and Performing Arts (SCPA)
- Shroder Paideia High School
- Taft High School
- Virtual High School
- Walnut Hills High School
- Western Hills High School
- Withrow High School
- Woodward High School

== Public High Schools (Listed by School District) of Greater Cincinnati ==
=== Kentucky ===
- Covington Independent Schools (Holmes High School)
- Kenton County Public Schools
  - Dixie Heights High School
  - Simon Kenton High School
  - Scott High School
- Beechwood Independent Schools (Beechwood High school)
- Ludlow Independent Schools (Ludlow High school)
- Erlanger-Elsmere Independent Schools (Lloyd Memorial High school)
- Boone County Public Schools
  - Conner High School
  - Randall K. Cooper High School
  - Ryle High school
  - Boone County High School
- Fort Thomas Independent Schools (Highlands High school)
- Newport Independent Schools (Newport High school)
- Dayton Independent Schools (Dayton High school)
- Bellevue Independent Schools (Bellevue High school)
- Campbell County Public Schools (Campbell County High school)
- Gallantin County Public Schools (Gallantin County High School)
- Bracken County Public Schools (Bracken County High School)
- Pendelton County Public Schools (Pendelton County High School)
- Williamstown Independent Schools (Williamstown High School)
- Grant County Public Schools (Grant County High school)

=== Indiana ===
- Franklin County School Corporation (Franklin County High School)
- Lawrenceburg School Corporation (Lawrenceburg High School)
- South Dearborn School Corporation (South Dearborn High School)
- Sunman Dearborn School Corporation (East Central High School)
- Batesville Community School Corporation (Batesville High School)

=== Ohio ===
- Batavia Local Schools (Batavia High School)
- Bethel-Tate Local Schools Bethel-Tate High School
- Clermont-Northeastern Local Schools (Clermont Northeastern High School)
- Community Charter Schools in Cincinnati
- Deer Park City Schools (Deer Park High School)
- Fairfield City School District (Fairfield High School)
- Felicity-Franklin Local Schools (Felicity-Franklin High School)
- Finneytown Local School District (Finneytown High School)
- Forest Hills School District
  - Anderson High School
  - Turpin High School
- Franklin City Schools (Franklin High School)
- Goshen Local Schools (Goshen High School)
- Hamilton City School District (Hamilton High School)
- Indian Hill Exempted Village School District (Indian Hill High School)
- Kings Local School District (Kings High School)
- Lakota Local School District
  - Lakota East High School
  - Lakota West High School
- Lebanon City School District (Lebanon High School)
- Little Miami Local School District (Little Miami High School)
- Lockland City Schools (Lockland High School)
- Loveland City Schools (Loveland High School)
- Madeira City Schools (Madeira High School)
- Mariemont City School District (Mariemont High School)
- Mason City School District (Mason High School)
- Middletown City School District (Middletown High School)
- Milford Exempted Village Schools (Milford High School)
- Monroe Local School District (Monroe High School)
- Mount Healthy City School District (Mount Healthy High School)
- New Richmond Exempted Village School District (New Richmond High School)
- North College Hill City Schools (North College Hill High School)
- Northwest Local School District
  - Colerain High School
  - Northwest High School
- Norwood City Schools (Norwood High School)
- Oak Hills Local School District (Oak Hills High School)
- Princeton City School District (Princeton High School)
- Reading Community Schools (Reading High School)
- Ross Local School District (Ross High School)
- Southwest Local School District (Harrison High School)
- Springboro Community City Schools (Springboro High School)
- St. Bernard/Elmwood Place City Schools (St. Bernard-Elmwood Place High School)
- Sycamore Community School District (Sycamore High School)
- Three Rivers Local School District (Taylor High School)
- Wayne Local Schools (Waynesville High School)
- West Clermont Local School District (West Clermont High School)
- Western Brown Local Schools (Western Brown High School)
- Williamsburg Local School District (Williamsburg High School)
- Winton Woods City School District (Winton Woods High School)
- Wyoming City School District (Wyoming High School)

== Private schools ==
=== Ohio ===
Cincinnati is also home to a number of private schools, many of which are affiliated with the Roman Catholic Archdiocese of Cincinnati.

- Archbishop Elder High School (boys)
- Badin High School (coed)
- Bishop Fenwick High School (coed)
- DePaul Cristo Rey High School (coed)
- La Salle High School (boys)
- Mercy McAuley High School (girls)
- Archbishop McNicholas High School (coed)
- Archbishop Moeller High School (boys)
- Mount Notre Dame High School (girls)
- Archbishop Purcell Marian High School (coed)
- Roger Bacon High School (coed)
- Seton High School (girls)
- Cincinnati Country Day School (coed)
- Cincinnati Hills Christian Academy (coed)
- Lakota Christian School (coed)
- Liberty Bible Academy
- Mars Hill Academy (coed)
- Miami Valley Christian Academy
- Purcell Marian High School (coed)
- Royalmont Academy (beginning 2014)
- St. Edmund Campion Academy(coed) Oakley, Cincinnati, Ohio
- St. Rita School for the Deaf
- St. Xavier High School (boys)
- St. Ursula Academy (girls)
- Seven Hills School (coed)
- Summit Country Day School (coed)
- Ursuline Academy (girls)

=== Kentucky ===
- Bishop Brossart High School (coed)
- Covington Catholic High School (boys)
- Community Christian Academy (coed)
- Covington Latin School (coed)
- Calvary Christian High School (coed)
- Heritage Academy (coed)
- Holy Cross High School (coed)
- Newport Central Catholic High School (coed)
- Notre Dame Academy (girls)
- St. Henry District High School (coed)
- Villa Madonna Academy (coed)

== See also ==
- List of high schools in Indiana
- List of high schools in Kentucky
- List of high schools in Ohio
