= Robert A. Taft Information Technology High School =

Public school in Ohio, United States

Taft Information Technology High School
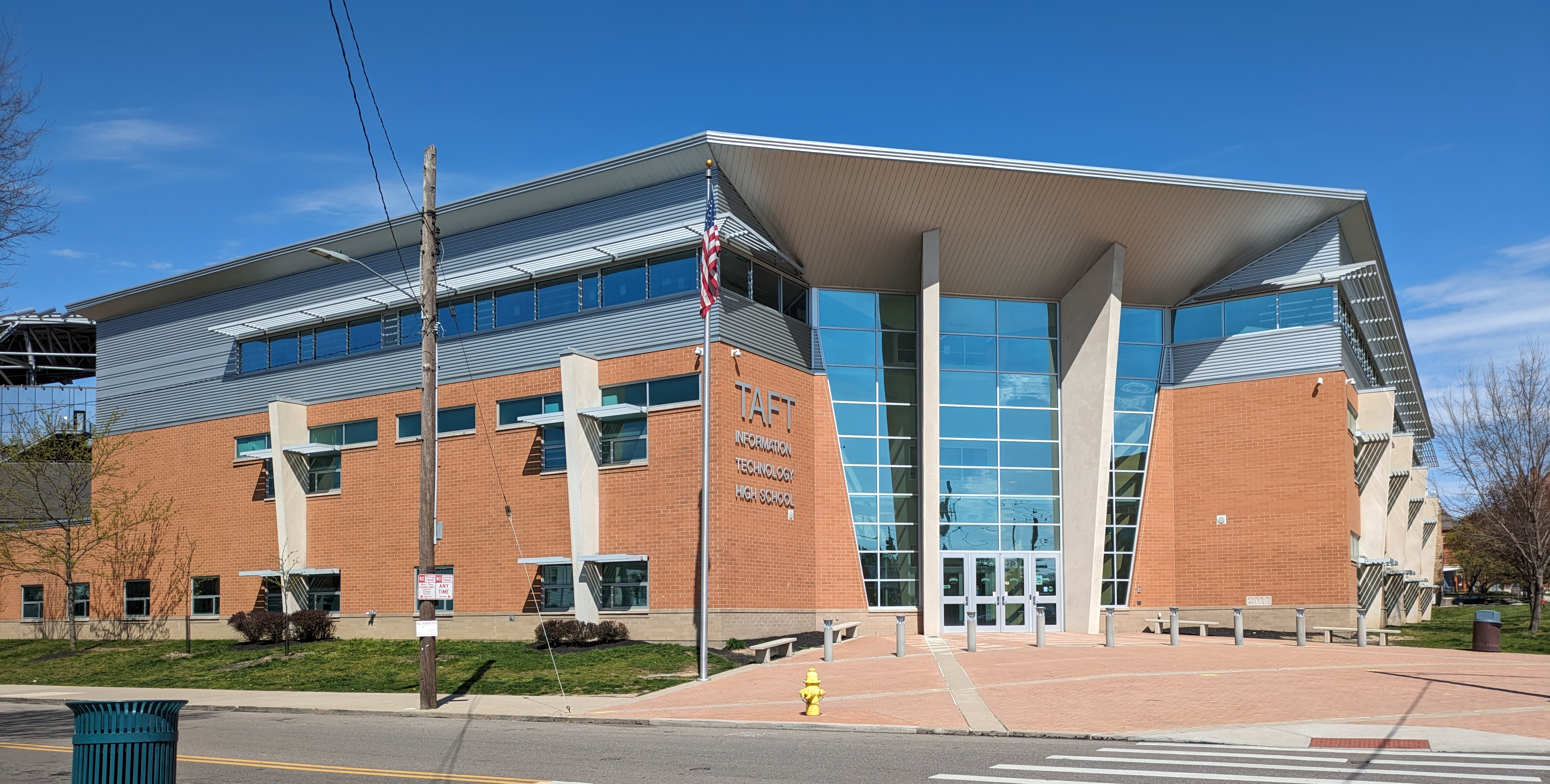

Location
- 420 Ezzard Charles Drive; Cincinnati, (Hamilton County), Ohio 45214; United States; 39°6′34″N 84°31′23″W

Information
- Type: Public, Coeducational high school
- Established: 1955
- Superintendent: Laura Mitchell
- Principal: Michael Turner
- Teaching staff: 24.00 (FTE)
- Grades: 7–12
- Student to teacher ratio: 24.71
- Colors: Green and Gold
- Athletics conference: Cincinnati Metro Athletic Conference
- Mascot: Senator
- Team name: Senators
- Accreditation: North Central Association of Colleges and Schools
- Website: taftiths.cps-k12.org

Taft Information Technology High School is a public high school located in the West End area of downtown Cincinnati, Ohio. It is part of the Cincinnati Public Schools district (CPS).

== History ==
The school was created in 1955 and named after former U.S. Senator Robert A. Taft, the son of former United States President William H. Taft. In the spring of 2011, a new $18 million building was constructed.

== Academics ==
Taft is a GRAD Cincinnati school, which helps students focus on the goal of going to college. This program awards college scholarships to students who fulfill requirements.

== Athletics ==
=== Stargel Stadium ===
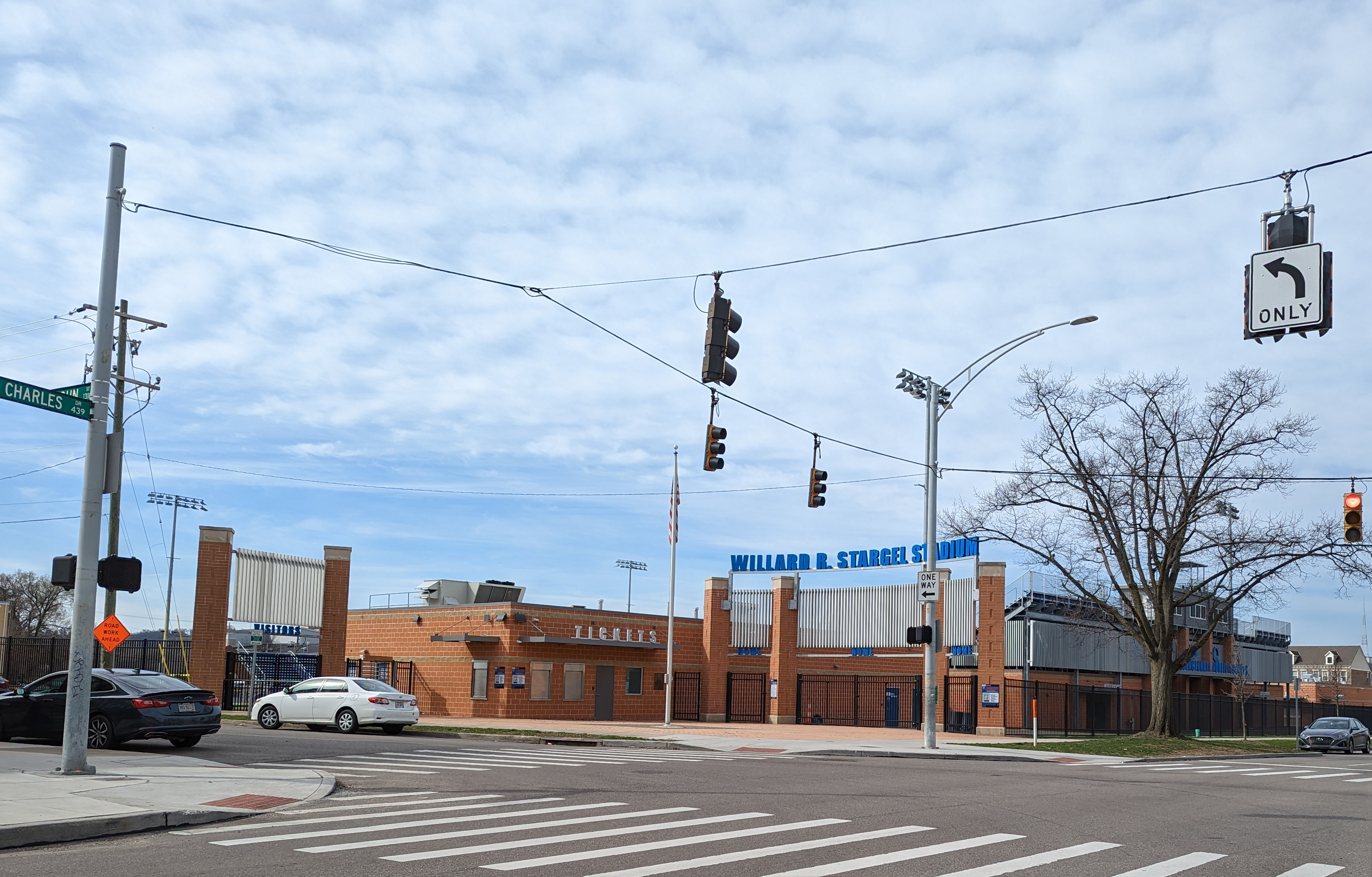
The entrance to Stargel Stadium in 2023

Taft Stadium was completed in 1986 for the school's football program, replacing a makeshift, hole-ridden practice field. In 1990, it was renamed for Willard R. Stargel, who served as football assistant coach and baseball and track head coach from 1955 to 1966. Stargel Stadium was rebuilt in 2004 and renovated in 2015. Taft shared the stadium with several other CPS athletic teams, namely the football teams of Aiken, Hughes, Shroder, Gamble, and Riverview East high schools and the track teams of Gamble, Riverview East, and Sayler Park School. The stadium was also home to Cincinnati Christian University football, Gotham Soccer, Kings Hammer Soccer, and Cincinnati Gators football. Stargel Stadium was demolished in 2018 to make room for FC Cincinnati's TQL Stadium.

Cincinnati Public Schools built a new Willard Stargel Stadium across the street from Taft in 2019. FC Cincinnati paid the district $10 million for the relocation. The 2019 football season opening game was held at the new stadium on August 28 before the official dedication on September 13. The stadium has a capacity of 3,000.

=== Ohio High School Athletic Association State Championships ===
- Boys Basketball – 1962, 2011, 2022

== Notable alumni ==
- Ken Sprague, bodybuilder
- Adolphus Washington, NFL player (Buffalo Bills, 2016–18)
- Jimmy Wynn, former MLB player (Houston Astros, Los Angeles Dodgers, Atlanta Braves, New York Yankees, Milwaukee Brewers)
