= Education in Cincinnati =

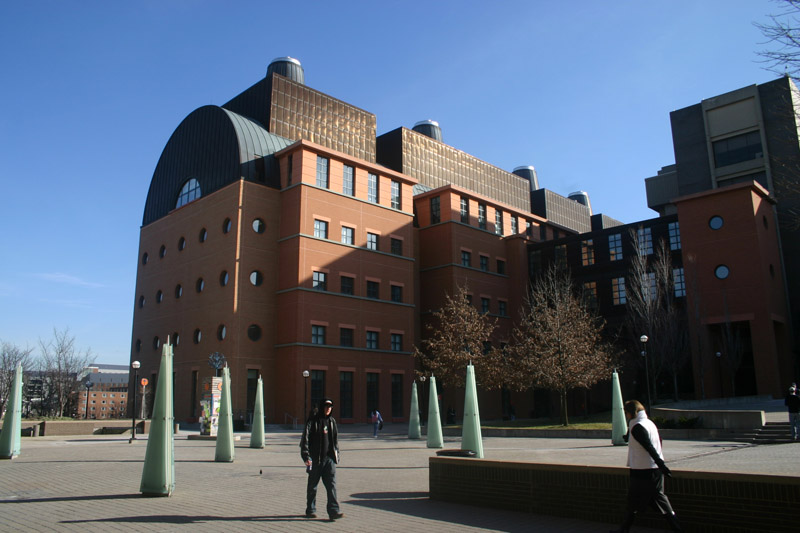
The Engineering Research Center at UC, designed by a UC Alumnus.

The Cincinnati Public School district includes 18 high schools, each accepting students on a citywide basis. The district includes many public Montessori schools, one of which, Clark Montessori, is the first public Montessori high school in the United States.

The city and region is also home to a variety of other schools, both public and private. There are schools for gifted and accelerated students. The Springer School and Center is the only regional school "devoted entirely to the education of children with learning disabilities." St Rita School for the Deaf educates students up through high school and vocational school.

In August 2007, Cincinnati Magazine published an article rating 36 private high schools in greater Cincinnati. The Roman Catholic Archdiocese of Cincinnati accounts for several high schools in metro Cincinnati, ten of which are single-sex: four all-male, and six all-female.

Cincinnati is also home to the all-female RITSS (Regional Institute for Torah and Secular Studies) high school, a small Orthodox Jewish institution., as well as the all-male Yeshivas Lubavitch High School.

According to the 2000 census, the Cincinnati area has some of the highest private school attendance rates in the United States, with Hamilton County ranking second only to St. Louis County, Missouri among the country's 100 largest counties.

== Higher education ==
Cincinnati is also home to several colleges and universities, including:

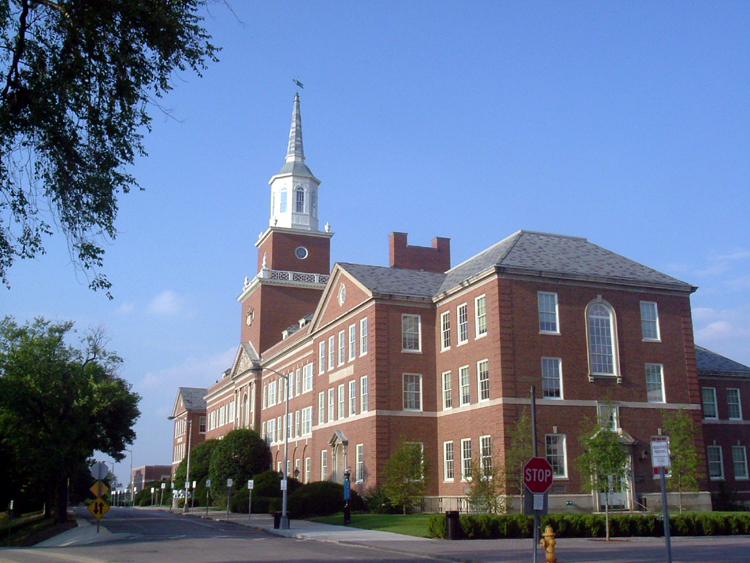
The University of Cincinnati's McMicken Hall.

- Art Academy of Cincinnati
- Art Institute of Cincinnati
- Cincinnati Christian University (closed January 2020)
- Cincinnati College of Mortuary Science
- Cincinnati State Technical and Community College
- God's Bible School and College
- University of Cincinnati
- Xavier University
- Union Institute & University
- Mount St. Joseph University
- Northern Kentucky University
- Gateway Community and Technical College
- Miami University (one of the original "Public Ivies")
- Thomas More College (Kentucky)

== See also ==
- List of high schools in Cincinnati, Ohio
