= Frédéric Bonin-Pissarro =

French-American painter

- Born: 1964 (age 61–62); Paris
- Known for: Painting

Frédéric Bonin-Pissarro or Frédéric Pissarro (born in 1964 in Paris) is a French painter. Since 2002, he has been a citizen of the United States.

== Family ==
Frédéric Bonin-Pissarro is the son of Sylvie and Claude Bonin-Pissarro, also a painter. He is a great-grandson of the "father of Impressionism", Camille Pissarro. His sister is named Lila. Married, he has three sons.

== Biography ==
Frederic began learning the art of painting with his father. Jean Edelmann also exerted a major influence on his style. In 1983–1984 Frédéric Bonin-Pissarro studied at the Ecole de Sèvres, then from 1984 to 1988 he studied at the École nationale supérieure des beaux-arts (ENSBA). There, he attended masterclasses of Jacques Yankel and of Antonio Segui. After his studies, he settled in Cincinnati (Ohio, USA). In 1989–90, Bonin-Pissarro worked on stage sets for the Théâtre Populaire des Cévennesin Paris. From 1991 to 1994, he drew up various projects for the Planète Magique amusement park in Paris. From 1995 to 1997, he taught at the art school Faire in Gisors. Since 1998, he has taught setting color, character design, writing scenario, illustration, composition and layout at the Art Institute of Cincinnati (AIC College of Design). In 2009, The Art Institute of Cincinnati has conferred him an associate degree in graphic design. He obtained a Bachelor of Arts and a Master in Arts, with mention summa cum laude from the Morehead State University in 2015 and 2017 respectively.

In 2017, he was appointed Visiting Lecturer at College of Fine Arts of University of Nevada, Las Vegas.

== Works ==
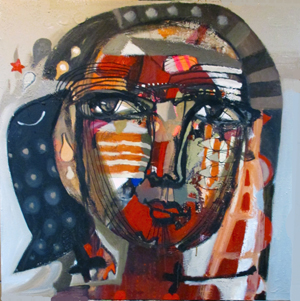
Ladyn'Bird by Frédéric Bonin-Pissarro

Frédéric Bonin-Pissarro first painted in a Neo-Impressionist style, in which he incorporated elements of fauvisme. Then, by adopting a clear line and more pronounced colors, his compositions have become more complex; patterns, dots and lines have appeared in his works, now considered part of the modern Abstract Art. His early paintings show the expressive face of representations of wildlife art and still life with oil paintings or acrylic. He describes his style as "expressive figurative".

=== Pictorial works (selection) ===
- Mouffetard St Market, Paris
- Two Minds, One Vision
- Cow Love
- Keeping It Together
- The Flip Side Of Love
- Urban Bird
- Sending Love
- Happy Projections
- Innocence
- Lady With Bird
- Modern Beauty
- Petit Mother
- Doubletake
- Family Bliss
- Takes Two To Tango
- Family Love
- Peace With Nature
- Love Bird
- Connected
- Maternite
- Amaman
- Modern Family
- Complex Relationships
- Party Bird

=== Exhibitions (selection) ===
Frédéric Bonin-Pissarro has exhibited at the following exhibitions:

- Salon des Indépendants, Société des Artistes Indépendants; Paris 1990
- Salon Comparaison; Paris 1992
- Salon de May, Paris 1993
- Salon de Mars; Paris 1993
- Salon de Bagneux (juried); Paris 1994
- Galerie de Synthese; Paris 1994
- Galerie de Beaux-Arts, Paris 1994
- Salon de Vitry; Paris 1995
- Galerie du C.R.O.U.S.; Paris 1996
- Galerie Jeanne Masson, Paris 1997
- Opus Gallery; Cleveland (Ohio) 1998
- Marquette Gallery, Cincinnati (Ohio) 1998
- Gallery Adrienne; San Francisco (California) 1999
- Fourway Gallery; Martha's Vineyard (Massachusetts) 1999
- Debruyne Gallery; Naples (Florida) 2000
- Art Factory; Rockford (Illinois) 2000
- Wally Findlay Gallery; Chicago (Illinois) 2001
- Marquette Gallery; Madeira (Ohio) 2001
- Wally Findlay Gallery; Chicago, New York, Palm Beach, London 2002–2009
- Titus Fine Art; Beverly Hills (California) 2005–2012
- The Pinacle; East Tsimshatsui (Hong Kong) 2011
- Festival International d'Art Singulier Contemporain, Grand Baz'Art à Bézu; Bézu-Saint-Éloi 2011
- Musee Prive; Paris 2011
- Outsider Gallery; French Town (New Jersey) 2011
- Greenwich Gallery; Cincinnati (Ohio) 2011
- Kings Wood Art Print Edition, dreijähriger Vertrag 2012
- Inauguration Galerie 30; Cannes 2012
- The Nursery Rhyme Project, Curator of Dion Hitchings; New Jersey 2012
- Gallery Artisti; Paris 2012
- Commission for last Pei building, Bangkok 2012
- Lille International Contemporary Art Fair (10 Gemälde), Lille 2012
- Acala Gallery (Einzelausstellung); Bangkok 2012
- The TOY Show, kuratiert von Dion Hitchings; New Jersey 2012
- Artop Gallery, Lille 2013

=== Publications ===
Frédéric Bonin-Pissarro made illustrations for the following books:

- Matt Ackermann: Antoine's Ault Park Adventure. 2008
- Missy Griffin : Gigi's Window. 2010
- Marion K. Allman" Hi! My Name is Casey. 2010

== Prize ==
The Key of the City of Cincinnati in 2001
