= Joseph Enzweiler =

American poet

Joseph Enzweiler (October 21, 1950 – April 16, 2011) was an American poet who lived in Fairbanks, Alaska.

== Biography ==
Enzweiler was born in Cincinnati and grew up in Madeira, Ohio. He graduated from Xavier University in 1973 with a Bachelor’s of Science in Physics and received his Master’s of Science in Physics from the University of Alaska Fairbanks in 1981. He settled in Fairbanks, building his own cabin and supporting himself through part-time work as a stonemason and carpenter to devote his time to writing.

He published six books of poetry and a memoir of his time in Alaska. His books were “Home Country”, “Stonework of the Sky”, “A Curb in Eden”, “A Curb in Eden: New Version”, “The Man Who Ordered Perch”, and “A Winter on Earth”. Before his death, Enzweiler also finished his memoir “We All Worship Something”, where he recollects his time in Fairbanks during the pipeline boom in the late 1900s. His literary works have been featured in several sources including The Writer’s Almanac and Verse Daily. His literary works covered topics including family, friendship, and life in Alaska.

He conducted workshops through various local venues such as the UAF’s Midnight Sun Visiting Writer series, the Fairbanks Arts Association Reading series, and the Adult Learning Program of Alaska. He was also active in the Southern Appalachian Writers Cooperative and has been featured in live radio interviews such as Around Cincinnati.

He was married to Dr Karen Grossweiner. In 2009, he was diagnosed with a brain tumor. He died on April 16, 2011.
