= Alex Tyus =

American-Israeli basketball player

Alex Tyus אלכס טיוס
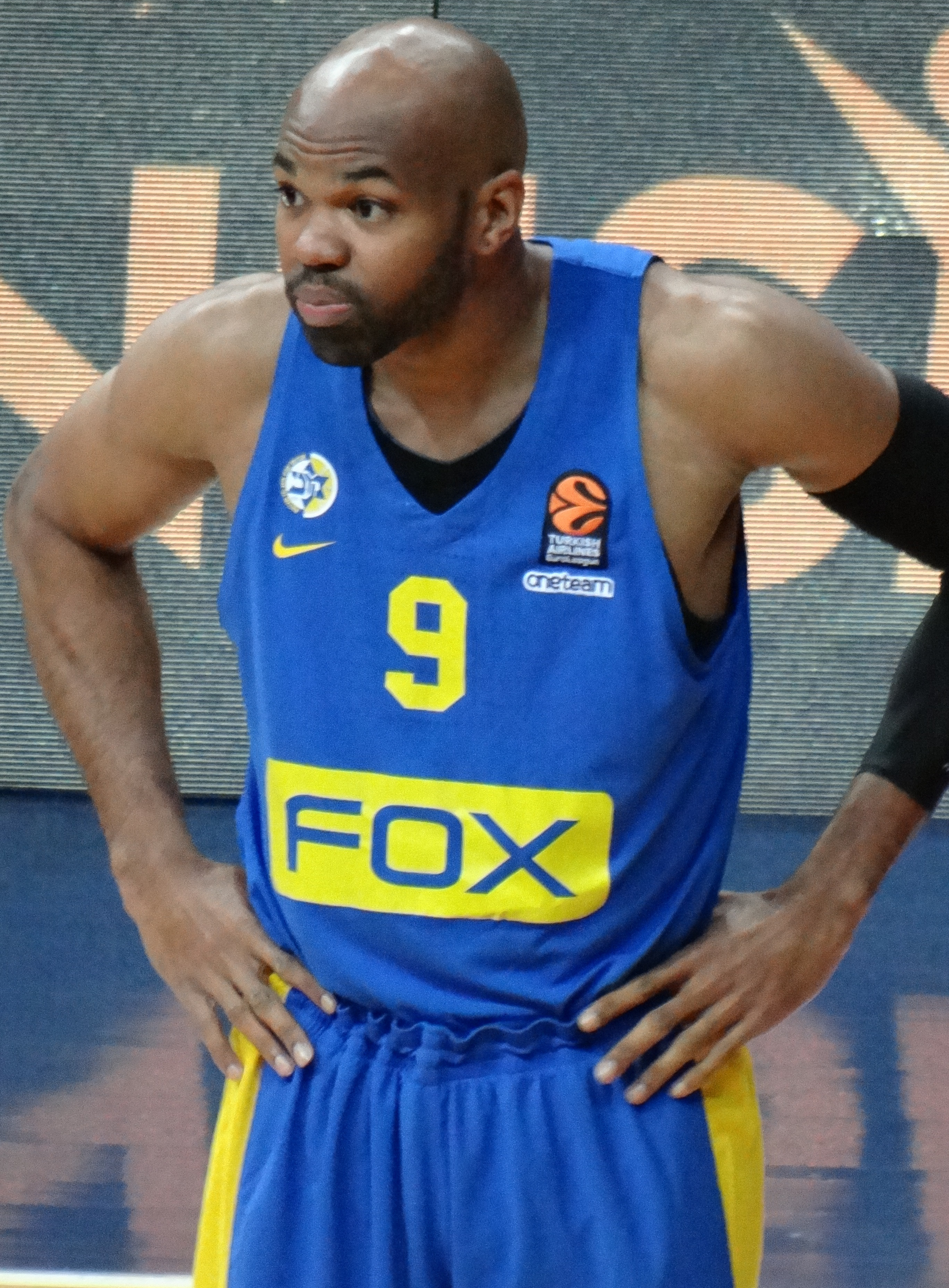
- Tyus with Maccabi Tel Aviv in 2018

No. 9 – Hapoel Haifa
- Position: Center
- League: Liga Leumit

Personal information
- Born: January 8, 1988 (age 38) St. Louis, Missouri, U.S.
- Listed height: 6 ft 8 in (2.03 m)
- Listed weight: 220 lb (100 kg)

Career information
- High school: Hazelwood Central (Florissant, Missouri); Harmony Prep (Cincinnati, Ohio)
- College: Florida (2007–2011)
- NBA draft: 2011: undrafted
- Playing career: 2011–present

Career history
- 2011–2012: Maccabi Ashdod
- 2012–2013: Mapooro Cantù
- 2013–2015: Maccabi Tel Aviv
- 2015–2016: Anadolu Efes
- 2016–2017: Galatasaray
- 2017–2019: Maccabi Tel Aviv
- 2019–2020: UNICS Kazan
- 2020: Galatasaray
- 2020–2021: Real Madrid
- 2021–2022: Pınar Karşıyaka
- 2022–2023: ASVEL
- 2023–2024: Runa Basket Moscow
- 2024: Hapoel Jerusalem
- 2024–2025: Pallacanestro Varese
- 2025: Maccabi Tel Aviv
- 2025–2026: Bandirma Bordo
- 2026–present: Hapoel Haifa

Career highlights
- EuroLeague champion (2014); 3× Israeli League champion (2014, 2018, 2019); 2× Israeli State Cup winner (2014, 2015); 2× Israeli League Cup winner (2013, 2017); Israeli League Final Four MVP (2018); All-Israeli League First Team (2014); All-Israeli League Second Team (2018); Israeli League Sixth Man of the Year (2012); Israeli League All-Star (2018); Turkish President's Cup winner (2015); Italian Supercup winner (2012)

Alexander Trent Tyus (Hebrew: אלכס טיוס; born January 8, 1988) is an American-born Israeli professional basketball player for Hapoel Haifa of the Liga Leumit. He was the 2018 Israeli Basketball Premier League Finals MVP with Maccabi Tel Aviv. Having been naturalized as an Israeli citizen, Tyus also represented the senior Israeli national basketball team. Standing at 2.03 meters (6' 8") tall, he is an athletic frontcourt player and good rebounder.

== High school career ==
Tyus played for his first two years of high school for Hazelwood Central High School in St. Louis. He then played for two years for Harmony Prep, leading it to the prep school national championship game in 2006.

== College career ==
Tyus attended the University of Florida, where he played college basketball under head coach Billy Donovan with the Florida Gators from 2007 to 2011, and was a member of two NCAA Tournament teams. He played a key role in the 2010–11 Gators' run to the Elite Eight with a 19-point, 17-rebound effort in the 83–74 overtime win over the BYU Cougars in the NCAA Tournament Sweet 16. As of 2012, his 1,333 career points were 22nd-best in school history.

== Professional career ==
=== Maccabi Ashdod (2011–2012) ===
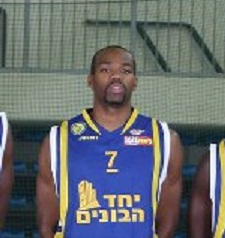
Tyus with Maccabi Ashdod in 2011

On June 28, 2011, Tyus started his professional career with the Israeli team Maccabi Ashdod after finishing four years at Florida.

=== Pallacanestro Cantù (2012–2013) ===
On July 12, 2012, Tyus signed a contract with the Italian team Pallacanestro Cantù where he played his first EuroLeague season.

=== Maccabi Tel Aviv (2013–2015) ===
On July 1, 2013, Tyus signed a two-year contract with Maccabi Tel Aviv. He was named the MVP of the 2013-14 EuroLeague for the month of April. He was one of the key players to help Maccabi advance to the EuroLeague Final Four. Eventually, Maccabi won the EuroLeague championship.

=== Anadolu Efes (2015–2016) ===
On July 21, 2015, Tyus signed a one-year contract with the Turkish club Anadolu Efes. In 24 EuroLeague games with Anadolu Efes, he averaged 5.9 points and 3 rebounds.

=== Galatasaray (2016–2017) ===
On July 12, 2016, Tyus signed a one-year deal with Galatasaray.

=== Return to Maccabi (2017–2019) ===
On June 22, 2017, Tyus returned to Maccabi Tel Aviv for a second stint, signing a two-year contract.

On May 27, 2018, Tyus recorded a season-high 20 points, shooting 10-of-12 from the field, along with five rebounds and two blocks in a 97–85 win over Bnei Herzliya. On June 8, 2018, Tyus earned a spot in the All-Israeli League Second Team. On June 14, 2018, Tyus led Maccabi Tel Aviv to win the 2018 Israeli League Championship after a 95–75 victory over Hapoel Holon. He was subsequently named Finals MVP.

On July 25, 2018, Tyus signed a one-year contract extension with Maccabi. On January 28, 2019, Tyus was named EuroLeague MVP of the Month after averaging 11.2 points, 4.2 rebounds and 1.4 blocks for 14.6 PIR per game, shooting 84 percent from the field in five games played in January. On March 28, 2019, Tyus recorded a EuroLeague career-high 20 points, shooting 9-of-11 from the field, along with six rebounds in a 90–55 win over Gran Canaria. Tyus helped Maccabi win the 2019 Israeli League Championship, winning his second straight Israeli League title in the process.

=== UNICS Kazan (2019–2020) ===
On July 13, 2019, Tyus signed a 1+1 contract with UNICS Kazan of the VTB United League. He averaged 10.3 points, 6.1 rebounds and 1.2 blocks per game.

=== Galatasaray (2020) ===
On November 4, 2020, Tyus signed with Galatasaray.

=== Real Madrid (2020–2021) ===
On December 29, 2020, he signed with Real Madrid of the Liga ACB. On July 1, 2021, Tyus officially parted ways with the Spanish club.

=== Pınar Karşıyaka (2021–2022) ===
On November 8, 2021, he has signed with Pınar Karşıyaka of the Basketbol Süper Ligi (BSL) and Basketball Champions League (BCL). He played 33 games for the team, 23 starts, and averaged 5.8 points, 1.3 rebounds, and 0.4 assists per game.

=== ASVEL (2022–2023) ===
On October 27, 2022, he signed with ASVEL Basket of the LNB Pro A. He played 61 games for the team, 14 starts, and averaged 5.0 points, 4.3 rebounds, and 0.4 assists per game.

=== Runa Moscow (2023–2024) ===
In summer 2023, he signed with Runa Moscow of the VTB United League. He played 36 games for the team, seven starts, and averaged 7.8 points, 4.8 rebounds, and 0.8 assists per game.

=== Hapoel Jerusalem (2024) ===
On April 25, 2024, he signed with Hapoel Jerusalem of the Israeli Basketball Premier League.

=== Pallacanestro Varese (2024–2025) ===
On November 5, 2024, he signed with Pallacanestro Varese of the Lega Basket Serie A (LBA).

=== Third Stint with Maccabi (2025) ===
On April 23, 2025, Tyus signed with Israeli Maccabi Tel Aviv until the end of the 2025 Israeli league season.

=== Bordo Sportif Balikesir (2025–2026) ===
On August 27, 2025, Tyus signed with Bandırma Bordo Basketbol.

=== Hapoel Haifa (2026–present) ===
On July 27, 2026, he signed with Hapoel Haifa.

== National team career ==
Tyus was a member of the senior Israeli national basketball team at the 2013 EuroBasket tournament.

== Personal life ==
During his college years he was introduced to Judaism by his roommate, and in 2011 Tyus and his then wife, Alli Cecchini (volleyball player of Florida Gators) who has Jewish roots, converted to Judaism together.

On June 10, 2012, Tyus received an Israeli passport.

== Career statistics ==
Legend
GP	Games played	GS	Games started	MPG	Minutes per game
FG%	Field-goal percentage	3P%	3-point field-goal percentage	FT%	Free-throw percentage
RPG	Rebounds per game	APG	Assists per game	SPG	Steals per game
BPG	Blocks per game	PPG	Points per game	PIR	Performance index rating
**Bold**	Career high

=== EuroLeague ===
†	Denotes season in which Tyus won the EuroLeague
*	Led the league

Year	Team	GP	GS	MPG	FG%	3P%	FT%	RPG	APG	SPG	BPG	PPG	PIR
2012–13	Cantù	10	0	19.8	.576	.000	.481	3.7	**.4**	.2	1.0	8.1	9.0
2013–14†	Maccabi	27	2	18.1	**.718***	.000	.526	5.0	.3	.3	1.0	7.7	10.9
2014–15	Maccabi	25	5	**21.1**	.611	—	.529	**5.2**	**.4**	.4	**1.4**	7.2	10.5
2015–16	Anadolu Efes	24	8	12.6	.537	.000	.446	3.0	.3	.3	.3	5.9	6.3
2016–17	Galatasaray	**30**	**10**	19.6	.683	.000	.553	**5.2**	.4	**.6**	1.1	**10.0**	**14.3**
2017–18	Maccabi	**30**	2	19.9	.617	—	.491	5.0	.2	.5	1.0	8.3	10.9
2018–19	Maccabi	**30**	5	18.3	.664	—	**.625**	4.1	.3	.5	1.1	7.3	10.0
2020–21	Real Madrid	20	7	12.0	.500	—	.750	2.6	.5	.4	.4	3.0	3.4
2022–23	ASVEL	25	6	17.8	.689	.000	.621	4.3	.4	.5	.8	5.7	8.1
Career		221	45	17.8	.636	.000	.534	4.4	.3	.4	1.1	7.2	9.6

=== College ===
Year	Team	GP	GS	MPG	FG%	3P%	FT%	RPG	APG	SPG	BPG	PPG
2007–08	Florida	**36**	0	12.7	.540	.000	.543	2.6	.3	.1	.6	4.3
2008–09	Florida	**36**	**36**	26.2	**.591**	.000	**.685**	6.2	.7	**.5**	.8	**12.5**
2009–10	Florida	34	34	**28.4**	.503	**.400**	.683	**6.9**	.4	**.5**	**1.0**	11.8
2010–11	Florida	**36**	**36**	25.1	.500	.333	.630	6.2	**.8**	.4	.8	9.1
Career		152	106	23.0	.534	.375	.652	5.4	.6	.4	.8	9.4

== See also ==
- List of select Jewish basketball players
