= Dater =

Dater may refer to:

- Judy Dater (born 1941), American photographer
- Dater Glacier, in Antarctica
- Dater High School (Cincinnati, Ohio)
- A participant in dating
- A type of snipe (promotional material used in movie theaters) to promote upcoming attractions
