= David Nordyke =

American educator

David H. Nordyke (February 4, 1952 – December 29, 2003) was an American educator who co-wrote the Charter School Bill for the U.S. state of Ohio.

== Background ==
Born in Dayton, Ohio, Nordyke earned a degree from the University of Dayton in English and secondary education. He took graduate courses at Xavier University in Cincinnati, and he also worked toward a doctoral degree at Miami University in Ohio.

After teaching in public and parochial schools, Nordyke founded Harmony Community School in 1998. He died in the school in 2003 over winter break, but the school still worked to achieve Nordyke's vision and mission.

== Harmony Community School ==
Harmony Community School (located in Roselawn, a neighborhood of Cincinnati, Ohio), was one of the largest charter high schools in the state of Ohio. The school's slogan was "One size fits few," which was a shortened form of Nordyke's educational philosophy. It closed on December 31, 2008.

== Charter schools ==
Ohio has emerged in the top ten list for states with the most Charter schools. The issue has been politically divisive, with Republican lawmakers tending to side with Charter schools, and Ohio teacher unions vehemently opposing the concept. The current Ohio law pertaining to Charter schools can be found here.

== Controversy ==
During his career, Nordyke became a lightning rod for controversy, engaging in publicized disputes with local politicians, oversight agencies, his own school board members, and even the local public library system. In 2001, David Nordyke's organization received $460,000 in public funds to cover the costs of salaries, supplies, and the rental of a facility. However, after complaints from the local library system, the government officials learned that Nordyke had previously left the facility while owing $40,000 in back rent, and had been secretly teaching the students at a local library without notifying his funding sources or the library itself. Despite calls from then-State Senator and current Cincinnati Mayor Mark Mallory to revoke the school's funding, Nordyke was able to secure a local warehouse to house the school and thus preserve its identity as a school.
