= Beck Way =

American baseball player (born 1999)

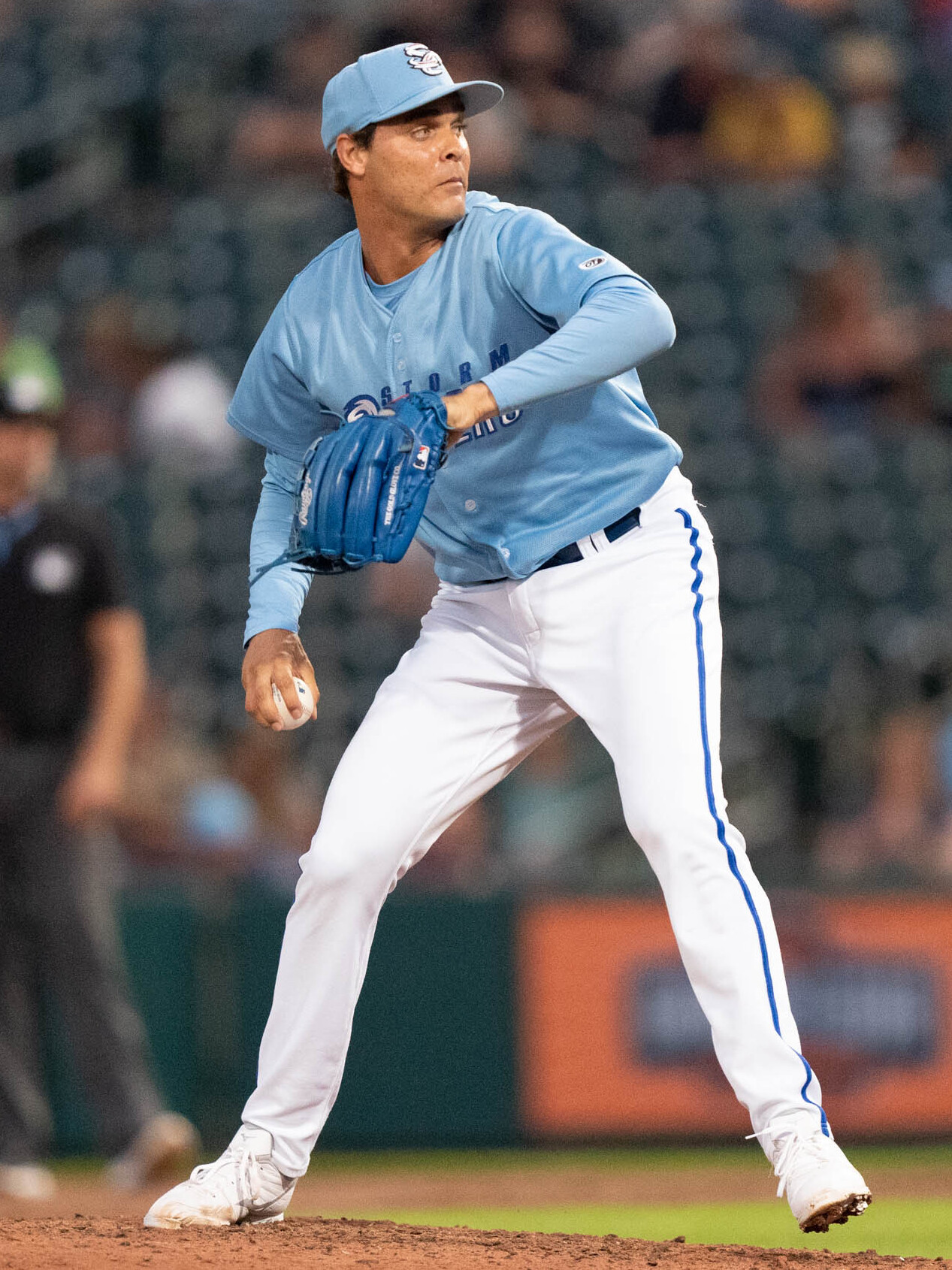
- Way with the Omaha Storm Chasers in 2025

Kansas City Royals – No. 44
- Pitcher
- Born: August 6, 1999 (age 27); Harrisburg, Pennsylvania, U.S.
- Bats: Right Throws: Right

MLB debut
- June 5, 2026, for the Kansas City Royals

MLB statistics (through 2026 season)
- Win–loss record: 1–1
- Earned run average: 3.86
- Strikeouts: 21
- Stats at Baseball Reference

Teams
- Kansas City Royals (2026–present)

Beck Michael Way (born August 6, 1999) is an American professional baseball pitcher for the Kansas City Royals of Major League Baseball (MLB). He made his MLB debut in 2026.

== Career ==
Way attended Cumberland Valley High School in Mechanicsburg, Pennsylvania, and played college baseball at Belmont Abbey College and Northwest Florida State College. In 2019, he played collegiate summer baseball with the Cotuit Kettleers of the Cape Cod Baseball League.

The New York Yankees selected Way in the fourth round of the 2020 Major League Baseball draft. Way played his first professional season in 2021 with the Tampa Tarpons and Hudson Valley Renegades. He started the 2022 season with Hudson Valley.

On July 27, 2022, the Yankees traded Way, T. J. Sikkema, and Chandler Champlain to the Kansas City Royals in exchange for Andrew Benintendi.

Way was assigned to the Triple-A Omaha Storm Chasers to begin the 2026 season, where he logged a 5-3 record and 4.50 ERA with 42 strikeouts across 19 appearances. On June 2, 2026, Way was selected to the 40-man roster and promoted to the major leagues for the first time.
