= Chandler Champlain =

American baseball player (born 1999)

Free agent
- Pitcher
- Born: July 23, 1999 (age 27); Mission Viejo, California, U.S.
- Bats: Right Throws: Right

Chandler Jay Champlain (born July 23, 1999) is an American professional baseball pitcher who is a free agent.

== Career ==
=== Amateur ===
Champlain attended Santa Margarita Catholic High School in Rancho Santa Margarita, California. The Los Angeles Angels selected Champlain in the 38th round of the 2019 MLB draft, but he did not sign a contract with the Angels. He enrolled at the University of Southern California (USC) and played college baseball for the USC Trojans.

=== New York Yankees ===
The New York Yankees selected Champlain in the ninth round (273rd overall) of the 2021 Major League Baseball draft. He made his professional debut in 2022 with the Single-A Tampa Tarpons, logging a 2–5 record and 4.30 ERA with 94 strikeouts across 16 appearances for the team.

=== Kansas City Royals ===
On July 27, 2022, the Yankees traded Champlain, T. J. Sikkema, and Beck Way to the Kansas City Royals in exchange for Andrew Benintendi. He made eight appearances (including seven starts) for the High-A Quad Cities River Bandits during the remainder of the year, compiling a 1-3 record and 9.84 ERA with 22 strikeouts over 32 innings of work.

Champlain split the 2023 campaign between Quad Cities and the Double-A Northwest Arkansas Naturals. In 25 starts for the two affiliates, he posted a cumulative 11-8 record and 3.33 ERA with 125 strikeouts across 135 1/3 innings pitched. Champlain made 28 appearances (including 27 starts) for Northwest Arkansas and the Triple-A Omaha Storm Chasers in 2024, registering an aggregate 6-10 record and 5.07 ERA with 120 strikeouts across 140 1/3 innings pitched.

Champlain returned to Omaha for the 2025 campaign, but struggled to a 4-9 record and 7.84 ERA with 100 strikeouts across 29 appearances (25 starts). On March 23, 2026, Champlain was released by the Royals organization.

=== Washington Nationals ===
On March 31, 2026, Champlain signed a minor league contract with the Washington Nationals organization. He elected free agency on November 2.

== Personal life ==
Champlain's father, Jay, played for USC's football team as a wide receiver. His mother, Robyn, is a former competitive downhill skier.
