= Miami Valley Conference =

High school athletics league in Ohio, US

- Classification: OHSAA
- Founded: 1979
- Sports fielded: 23 (12 men's, 11 women's)
- No. of teams: 14
- Headquarters: Cincinnati, OH
- Region: Ohio

The Miami Valley Conference (MVC) is an OHSAA athletic league whose members are located in the Ohio counties of Hamilton County and Butler County. The league was established in 1979.

Purcell Marian and Roger Bacon are the most recent additions to the conference, first as a football only members beginning in 2019, then full members starting in 2021.

== Current members ==
| School | Nickname | Location | Colors | Founded | Type |
Miami Valley Conference (MVC)
| CHCA | Eagles | Cincinnati, Ohio | | 1989 | Private, Coeducational, Non-denominational Christian |
| Cincinnati Christian | Cougars | Fairfield, Ohio | | 1971 | Private, Christian |
| Cincinnati Country Day | Nighthawks | Cincinnati, Ohio | | 1974 | Private, coeducational, college preparatory |
| Clark Montessori | Cougars | Cincinnati, Ohio | | 1994 | Public, Coeducational high school |
| Lockland | Panthers | Lockland, Ohio | | 1851 | Public, Coeducational high school |
| Miami Valley Christian | Lions | Cincinnati, Ohio | | 1995 | Private, coeducational, Non-denominational Christian |
| New Miami | Vikings | New Miami, Ohio | | 1972 | Public, Coeducational high school |
| North College Hill | Trojans | North College Hill, Ohio | | 1901 | Public, Coeducational high school |
| Norwood | Indians | Norwood, Ohio | | 1901 | Public, Coeducational high school |
| Purcell Marian | Cavaliers | Cincinnati, Ohio | | 1980 | Parochial, Coeducational high school |
| Roger Bacon | Spartans | St. Bernard, Ohio | | 1928 | Parochial, Coeducational high school |
| Seven Hills | Stingers | Cincinnati, Ohio | | 1906 | Private school |
| St. Bernard-Elmwood Place | Titans | St. Bernard, Ohio | | 1900 | Public, Coeducational high school |
| Summit Country Day | Silver Knights | Cincinnati, Ohio | | 1890 | Private, Roman Catholic |

=== Former members ===
- Cincinnati College Prep Lions (Football only, 2017-2020)
- Cincinnati Landmark Christian Eagles (1984-2004, school closed)
- Batavia Bulldogs (1985–89)
- Miamisburg Dayton Christian Warriors (Football only, 2013-2018)

== Membership timeline ==
Full member Full member (non-football) Associate member (football only)

== Sponsored sports ==
=== Boys ===
- Baseball
- Basketball
- Bowling
- Cross country
- Football
- Golf
- Lacrosse
- Soccer
- Swimming & diving
- Tennis
- Outdoor track
- Wrestling

=== Girls ===
- Basketball
- Bowling
- Cross country
- Golf
- Lacrosse
- Soccer
- Softball
- Swimming & diving
- Tennis
- Outdoor track
- Volleyball

==== Football divisional alignment starting in 2025 ====
Miami Valley Conference
| Buckeye Division | Gray Division | Scarlet Division |
|---|---|---|
| Lockland | Cincinnati Country Day | CHCA |
| Miami Valley Christian | Clark Montessori | Purcell Marian |
| New Miami | North College Hill | Roger Bacon |
| St. Bernard-Elmwood Place | Norwood | Summit Country Day |

==== Football divisional alignment from 2021-2024 ====
Miami Valley Conference
| Gray Division | Scarlet Division |
|---|---|
| Cincinnati Country Day | CHCA |
| Clark Montessori | North College Hill |
| Lockland | Norwood |
| Miami Valley Christian | Purcell Marian |
| New Miami | Roger Bacon |
| St. Bernard-Elmwood Place | Summit Country Day |

== See also ==
- Ohio high school athletic conferences
- Ohio High School Athletic Association
