= T. J. Sikkema =

American baseball player (born 1998)

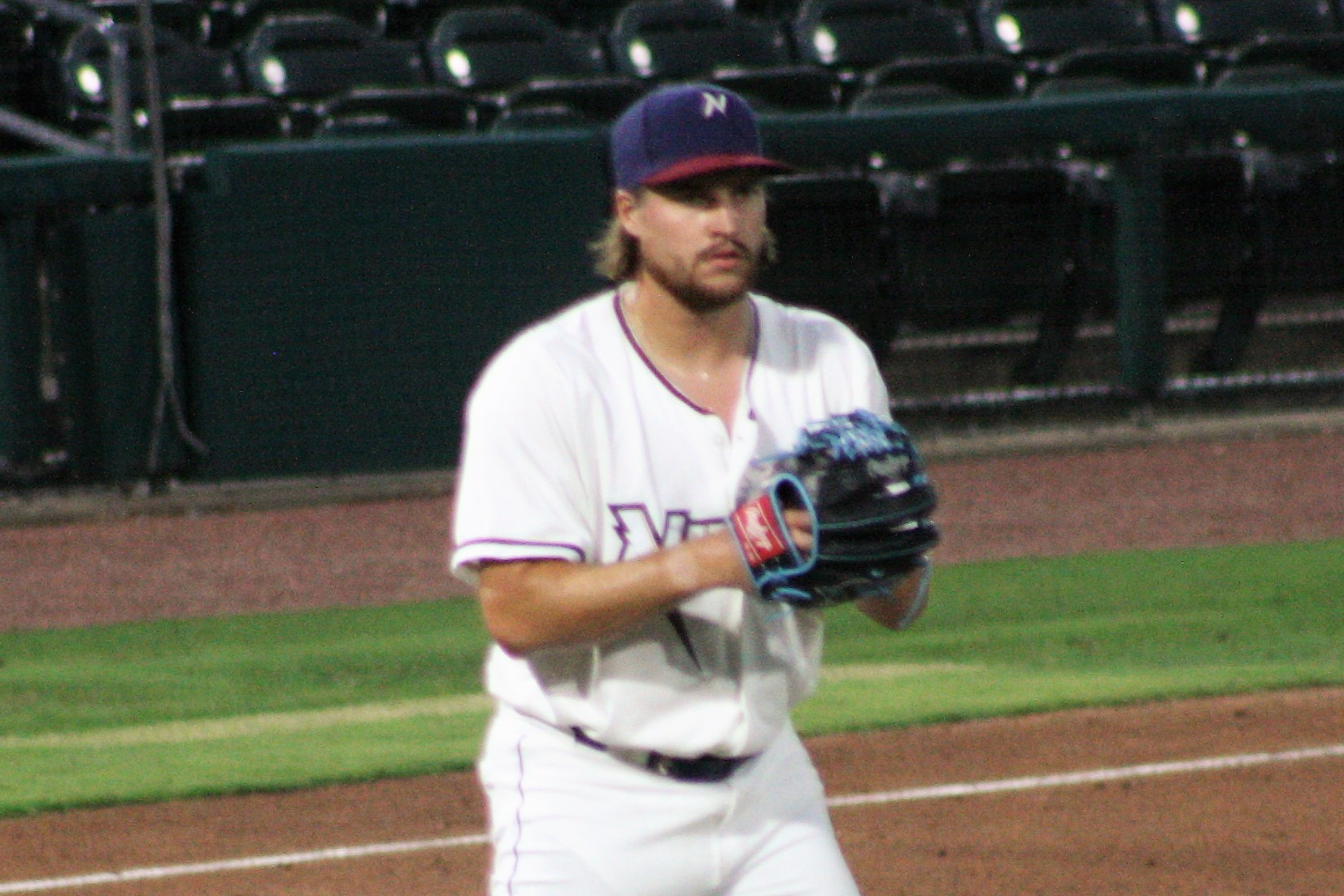
- Sikkema with the Northwest Arkansas Naturals

Kane County Cougars – No. 14
- Pitcher
- Born: July 25, 1998 (age 28); Clinton, Iowa, U.S.
- Bats: Left Throws: Left
- Stats at Baseball Reference

Tyler James Sikkema (born July 25, 1998) is an American professional baseball pitcher for the Kane County Cougars of the American Association of Professional Baseball. He played college baseball for the Missouri Tigers.

== Amateur career ==
Sikkema attended Central DeWitt High School in his hometown of DeWitt, Iowa. In 2016, his senior season, he went 8-1 with a 1.03 ERA, earning All-State honors. Unselected in the 2016 Major League Baseball draft, he enrolled at the University of Missouri where he played college baseball for the Missouri Tigers.

In 2017, Sikkema's freshman year at Missouri, he appeared in 22 games (three starts), pitching to an 8-2 record with a 2.72 ERA and four saves, earning a spot on the All-SEC Freshman Team. As a sophomore in 2018, Sikkema pitched in 16 games (making ten starts), going 3-5 with a 3.34 ERA. After the season, he played for the Falmouth Commodores of the Cape Cod Baseball League where he went 1-3 with a 1.72 ERA in 31 1/3 innings, and was named a league all-star. In 2019, his junior season, he compiled a 7-4 record with a 1.32 ERA in 17 games (13 starts), striking out 101 batters in 88 2/3 innings. He was named to the All-SEC Second Team.

== Professional career ==
=== New York Yankees ===
Sikkema was selected by the New York Yankees with the 38th overall selection of the 2019 Major League Baseball draft. He signed with the Yankees for the slot value of $1.95 million and made his professional debut with the Staten Island Yankees of the Class A Short Season New York–Penn League. Over 10 2/3 innings, he gave up one run. He did not play a minor league game in 2020 due to the cancellation of the minor league season caused by the COVID-19 pandemic. He missed all of the 2021 season due to a shoulder injury.

Sikkema was assigned to the Hudson Valley Renegades of the High-A South Atlantic League to begin the 2022 season.

=== Kansas City Royals ===
On July 27, 2022, Sikkema, Beck Way, and Chandler Champlain were traded to the Kansas City Royals in exchange for Andrew Benintendi. He was subsequently assigned to the Northwest Arkansas Naturals of the Double-A Texas League. Over 18 starts between Hudson Valley and Northwest Arkansas, Sikkema went 1-6 with a 4.83 ERA and 83 strikeouts over 69 innings. He was selected to play in the Arizona Fall League for the Surprise Saguaros after the season. He returned to the Naturals for the 2023 season. Over 34 relief appearances, Sikkema went 4-4 with a 5.85 ERA and 63 strikeouts over 72 1/3 innings.

=== Cincinnati Reds ===
On December 6, 2023, the Cincinnati Reds selected Sikkema in the minor league phase of the Rule 5 draft. Sikkema played the 2024 season with the High-A Dayton Dragons and Double-A Chattanooga Lookouts, going 6-3 with a 3.61 ERA and 72 strikeouts over twenty games (14 starts).

Sikkema was assigned to Chattanooga to open the 2025 season. In 23 appearances split between the Lookouts and the Triple-A Louisville Bats, he accumulated an 8-4 record and 4.57 ERA with 72 strikeouts across 86 2/3 innings pitched. Sikkema elected free agency following the season on November 6, 2025.

=== Boston Red Sox ===
On January 6, 2026, Sikkema signed a minor league contract with the Boston Red Sox. He made two starts for the Triple-A Worcester Red Sox, struggling to a 9.64 ERA with four strikeouts across 4 2/3 innings pitched. Sikkema was released by the Red Sox organization on June 11.

=== Kane County Cougars ===
On July 23, 2026, Sikkema signed with the Kane County Cougars of the American Association of Professional Baseball.

== See also ==
- Rule 5 draft results
