= Madeira High School =

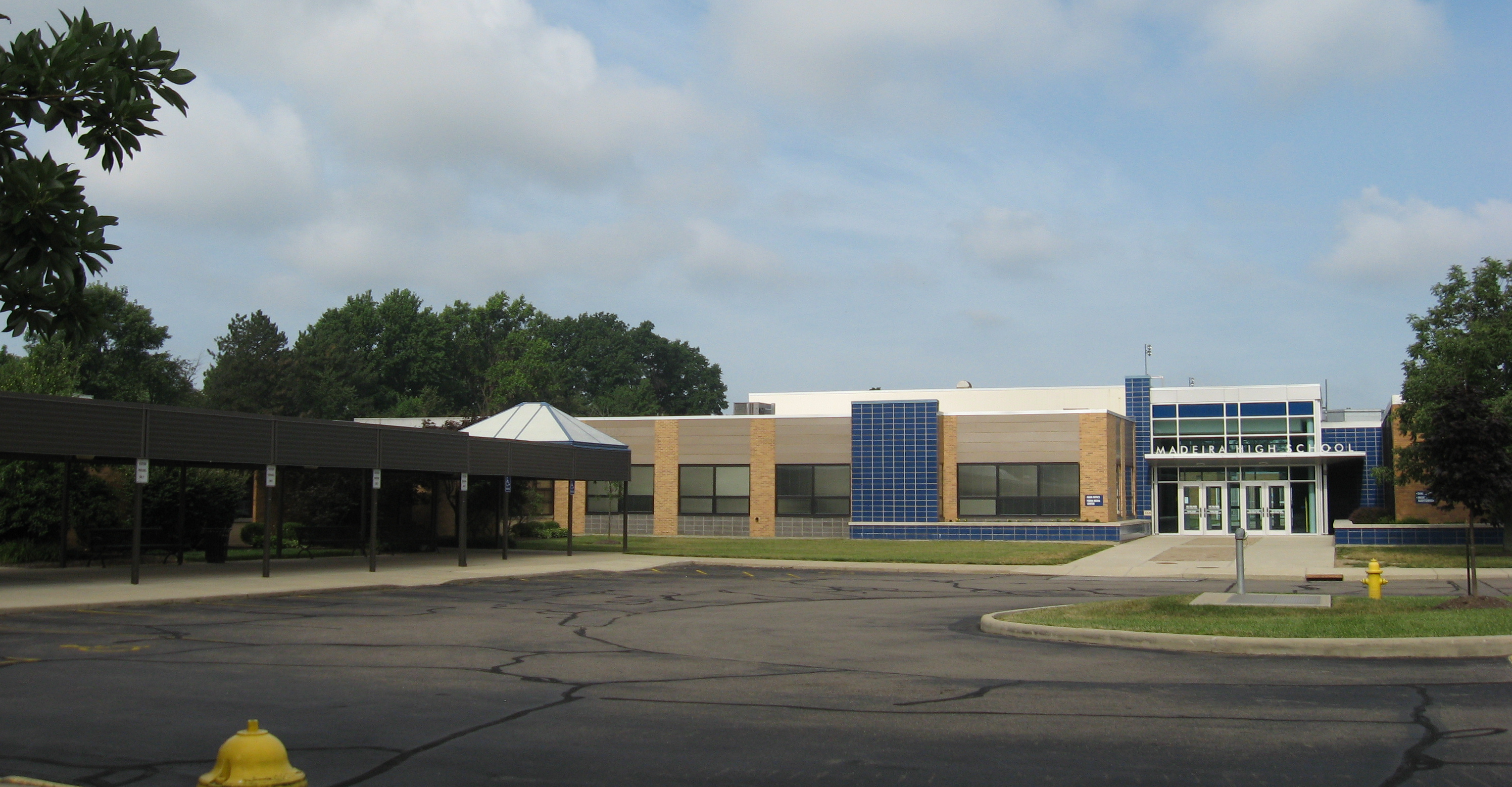

Location
- 7465 Loannes Drive; Madeira, Hamilton County, Ohio 45243; United States
- Coordinates: 39°12′3″N 84°21′58″W

Information
- Type: Public, Coeducational high school
- Motto: A school community where learning is personalized and success is ensured.
- Established: 1922
- School district: Madeira City School District
- Superintendent: Kenji Matsudo
- Principal: Dave Kennedy
- Teaching staff: 32.00 (FTE)
- Grades: 9-12
- Student to teacher ratio: 13.81
- Colors: Blue and Gold
- Fight song: "On Madeira"
- Athletics conference: Cincinnati Hills League
- Team name: Mustangs, Amazons
- Rival: Indian Hill High School
- Accreditation: North Central Association of Colleges and Schools
- Publication: "What's Up Madeira"
- Website: Madeira High School

Madeira High School is a public high school in Madeira, Ohio, a bedroom community near Cincinnati, Ohio. Madeira High School is the only high school in the Madeira City Schools District.

== Academics ==
MHS is known for academic excellence, which has been recognized by U.S. News & World Report; in 2015, the publishing company ranked MHS 13th in the State of Ohio and 282nd in the nation. With a 75 percent student body participation in Advanced Placement Exams, MHS's students have an overall AP Exam pass rate of 81 percent.

== Student life ==
Madeira's Latin Club, the Madeira Junior Classical League, functions as a local chapter of both the Ohio Junior Classical League (OJCL) and the National Junior Classical League (NJCL). In 2010, Madeira placed second in the Overall Club Sweepstakes at OJCL State Convention and third place in both the 2012 and 2013 State Conventions. Other clubs and activities active at MHS are Art Club, Academic Team, Chess Club, Madeira Marching Mustangs, Madeira Theatre Arts, Student Government, and Unified for Uganda.

What's Up Madeira? is a weekly student-run video news series popular amongst students. School announcements, upcoming events, student and teacher interviews, and a weather report are typically featured in each video.

== Athletics ==
Madeira is a member of the Cincinnati Hills League (CHL). The Mustangs and Amazons have had success at both the league level and the state level. The school has a strong rivalry with the Mariemont Warriors.

=== Ohio High School Athletic Association championships ===
- Girls Volleyball – 1978
- Boys Baseball – 1999
- Boys Soccer – 2002, 2003
- Girls Soccer – 2010, 2024, 2025

== Notable alumni ==
- Eli Maiman, 2004, guitarist for Walk the Moon
- Andrew Benintendi, 2013, former player for the Arkansas Razorbacks baseball team, outfielder for the Chicago White Sox
- John McNally, 2017, tennis player at Ohio State University
- Caty McNally, 2020, professional tennis player
