= Andrew Benintendi =

American baseball player (born 1994)

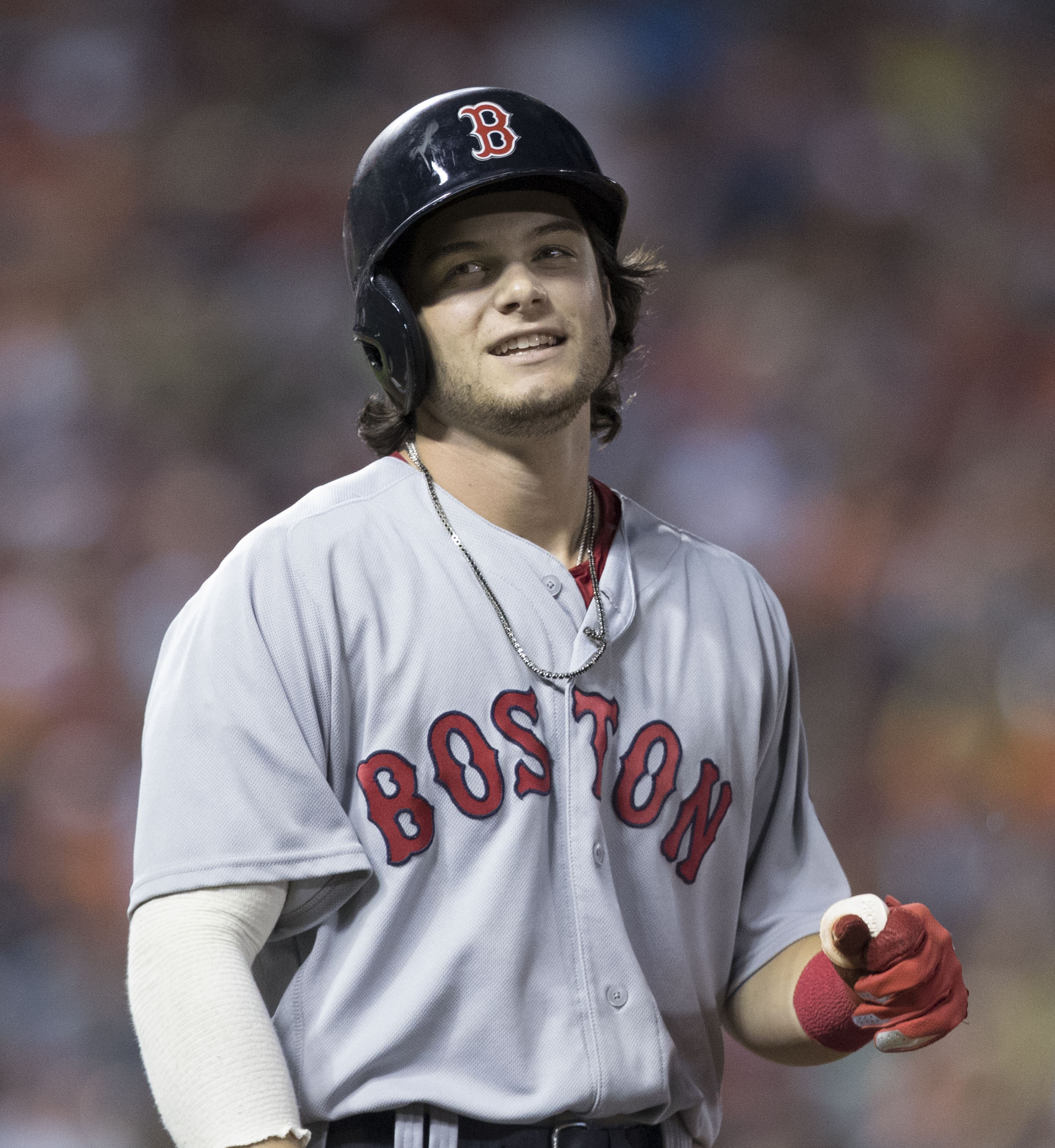
- Benintendi with the Boston Red Sox in 2016

Chicago White Sox – No. 23
- Left fielder
- Born: July 6, 1994 (age 32); Cincinnati, Ohio, U.S.
- Bats: Left Throws: Left

MLB debut
- August 2, 2016, for the Boston Red Sox

MLB statistics (through 2026 season)
- Batting average: .265
- Home runs: 133
- Runs batted in: 634
- Stats at Baseball Reference

Teams
- Boston Red Sox (2016–2020); Kansas City Royals (2021–2022); New York Yankees (2022); Chicago White Sox (2023–present)

Career highlights and awards
- All-Star (2022); World Series champion (2018); Gold Glove Award (2021); Golden Spikes Award (2015); Dick Howser Trophy (2015)

Andrew Sebastian Benintendi (born July 6, 1994) is an American professional baseball outfielder for the Chicago White Sox of Major League Baseball (MLB). He has previously played in MLB for the Boston Red Sox, Kansas City Royals, and New York Yankees.

Benintendi played college baseball for the Arkansas Razorbacks, where he won the Golden Spikes Award and Dick Howser Trophy in 2015. The Red Sox selected Benintendi in the first round of the 2015 MLB draft, and he made his MLB debut with the Red Sox in 2016. He was a part of the 2018 World Series champions. The Red Sox traded Benintendi to the Royals after the 2020 season. He won a Gold Glove Award in 2021 and was an All-Star in 2022. The Yankees acquired him from the Royals in July 2022, and he signed with the White Sox as a free agent after the 2022 season.

== Amateur career ==
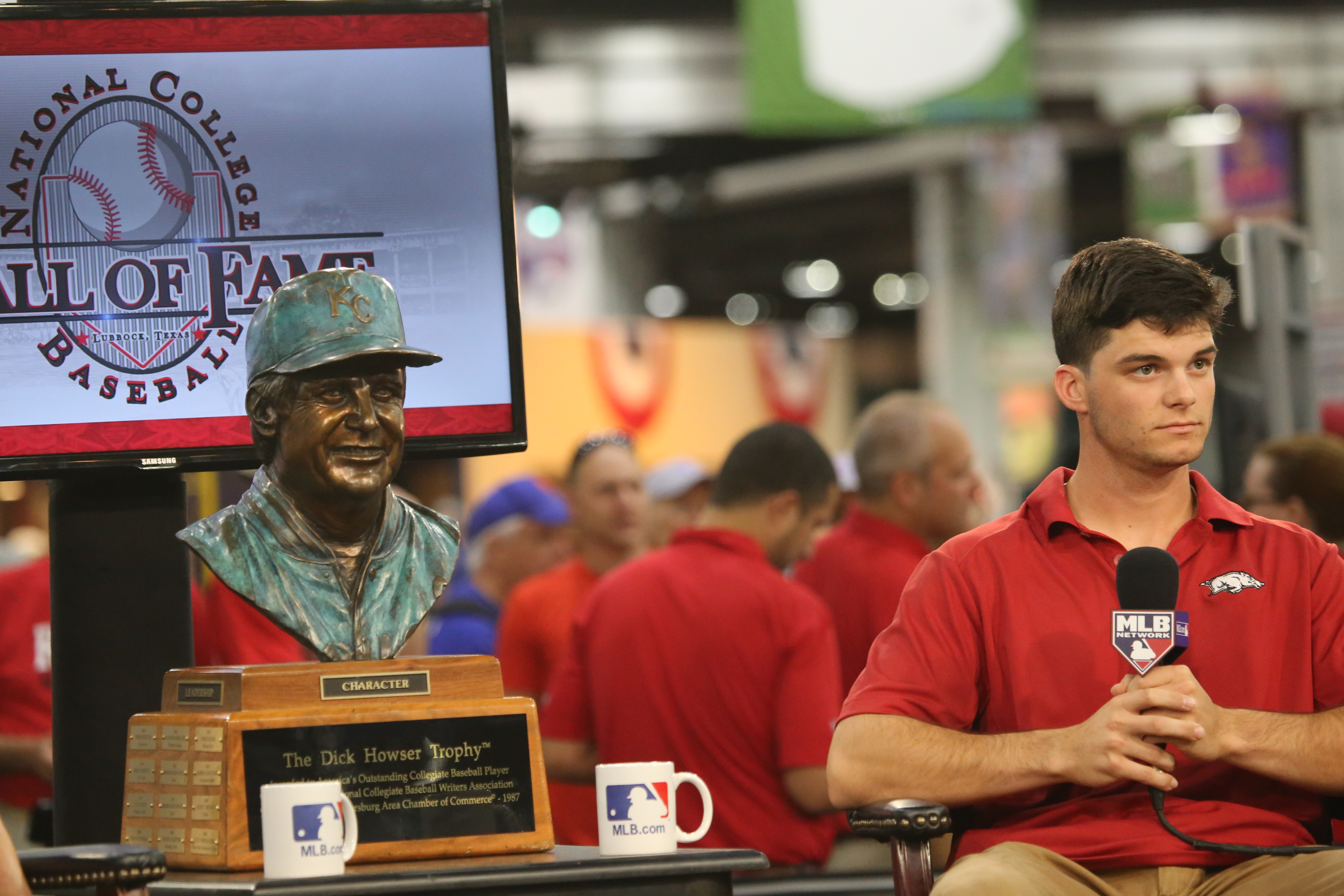
Benintendi receiving the Dick Howser Trophy in 2015

Benintendi attended Madeira High School, in Madeira, Ohio. Playing for the school's baseball team, he batted .564 with 12 home runs, 57 runs batted in (RBIs), and 38 stolen bases for the Mustangs baseball team in his senior year. Benintendi was the ABCA/Rawlings National High School Player of the Year and Ohio Gatorade Baseball Player of the Year. He finished his high school career with an Ohio-record 199 career runs scored. He also played high school basketball, earning 2011–12 Cincinnati Enquirer Division III Co-Player of the Year honors and setting school records in career points (1,753) and season points (638), career three-pointers (180), and points per game in a season (25.5).

The Cincinnati Reds selected Benintendi in the 31st round of the 2013 Major League Baseball (MLB) draft, but he did not sign with the Reds. He enrolled at the University of Arkansas to play college baseball for the Arkansas Razorbacks baseball team. As a true freshman, he played in 61 games, with 60 starts and hit .276/.368/.333 with one home run and 27 RBIs.

In 2015, his sophomore year, Benintendi led the Southeastern Conference (SEC) in batting average (.380), home runs (19), on-base percentage (.489), slugging percentage (.715), and walks (47). He was named the SEC Player of the Year. He also won the Baseball America College Player of the Year Award, the Dick Howser Trophy, and the Golden Spikes Award.

== Professional career ==
=== Boston Red Sox ===
==== 2015–2017 ====
The Boston Red Sox chose Benintendi with the seventh overall selection in the 2015 MLB draft. He signed with the Red Sox, receiving a $3.6 million signing bonus. Benintendi made his professional debut with the Lowell Spinners of the Class A-Short Season New York–Penn League. Andrew finished the 2015 season playing 19 games for the Class A Greenville Drive going 26/74 (.351) and posting an OPS of 1.011. He began the 2016 season with the Salem Red Sox of the Class A-Advanced Carolina League and received a promotion to the Portland Sea Dogs of the Double-A Eastern League on May 15.

The Red Sox promoted Benintendi to the major leagues on August 2, 2016, straight from Double-A, only 421 days after being selected in the draft. He made his major league debut on August 2, against the Seattle Mariners as a pinch hitter, and recorded his first major league hit off of Hisashi Iwakuma on August 3. Benintendi recorded both his first major league triple and home run against the Detroit Tigers on August 21 in a 10–5 loss.

On October 6, in Game 1 of the 2016 ALDS against the Cleveland Indians, Benintendi hit a home run in his first postseason at bat, off of Indians' pitcher Trevor Bauer. With the feat, Benintendi became the youngest Red Sox player to hit a home run in a postseason game. However, the Indians won the game by a score of 5–4 and swept the series in three games. Benintendi ended the 2016 season with a .295 batting average, 31 hits, 14 RBIs, two home runs, and one stolen base in 34 games played.

Benintendi started 2017 on the Red Sox' Opening Day roster, batting second as Boston defeated the Pittsburgh Pirates by a score of 5–3. On July 4, against the Texas Rangers, Benintendi went 5-for-5 with 6 RBIs, two home runs, and a double in the 11–4 victory. He finished second in the American League Rookie of the Year voting, despite receiving no first-place votes due to Aaron Judge winning unanimously. Overall, during the 2017 Red Sox regular season, Benintendi batted .271 with 20 home runs, 90 RBIs and 20 stolen bases in 151 games played. In the ALDS against the eventual World Series champions, the Houston Astros, he batted .250 (4-for-16) with a home run and two RBIs in four games.

==== 2018–2020 ====
Through the first half of the 2018 season, he was the team's regular left fielder, usually batting second, behind Mookie Betts. On July 8, Benintendi was named as a candidate in the American League's All-Star Final Vote for a spot in the 2018 MLB All-Star Game. At that time, Benintendi had a slash line of .293/.379/.515 with 14 home runs and 55 RBIs. Instead, fans voted in Jean Segura of the Seattle Mariners. For the season Benintendi appeared in 148 games hitting .290 with 41 doubles, 103 runs scored, 16 home runs, 87 RBIs, and stealing 21 bases. In the MLB playoffs, Benintendi recorded the final outs to seal victories for the Red Sox in Games 4 and 5 of the American League Championship Series, the first of the two a diving effort to prevent a bases-loaded hit in a two-run game. The Red Sox won the World Series over the Los Angeles Dodgers, giving Benintendi a championship title. In the World Series, Benintendi had four hits in Game 1 and hit .333 in series.

Benintendi began the 2019 season as Boston's regular left fielder. Manager Alex Cora initially made him the team's leadoff hitter, until the start of June when Cora moved Benintendi to second in the order, with Mookie Betts batting first, as was the team's usual order in 2018. On June 11, Benintendi was ejected for the first time in his MLB career for a comment he made about home plate umpire Ángel Hernández that was heard by first base umpire Vic Carapazza. For the season, Benintendi appeared in 138 games, batting .266 with 40 doubles, 13 home runs and 68 RBIs.

On February 8, 2020, the Red Sox announced signing Benintendi to a two-year contract worth $10 million, avoiding arbitration. On July 29, he recorded the 500th hit of his major league career, a ground rule double off of New York Mets pitcher Jeurys Familia. Benintendi was placed on the 10-day injured list on August 12, with a right rib cage strain. Benintendi's 2020 campaign came to an end on September 8, after being transferred to the 45-day injury list. With the 2020 Red Sox, Benintendi was 4-for-39 at the plate (.103) with one RBI.

=== Kansas City Royals (2021–2022) ===
On February 10, 2021, the Red Sox traded Benintendi and cash to the Kansas City Royals as part of a three-team trade in which the Red Sox acquired Franchy Cordero, Josh Winckowski, and three players to be named later (identified in June as minor league prospects: outfielder Freddy Valdez from the New York Mets, and pitchers Grant Gambrell and Luis De La Rosa from the Royals) while the Mets received Khalil Lee. In his first year with the Royals, Benintendi batted .276/.324/.442 with 17 home runs and 73 RBIs in 134 games. He led all left fielders with 1,116 innings played and a .987 fielding percentage, and won his first Gold Glove Award.

In salary arbitration, Benintendi was awarded a salary of $8.5 million for the 2022 season. He began the season batting .317 en route to being named the Royals' lone representative to the 2022 MLB All-Star Game. In July 2022, Benintendi was one of several Royals players who was unable to play against the Toronto Blue Jays due to Benintendi's refusal to be vaccinated against the COVID-19 virus (and would have been denied entry to Canada due to health requirements at the time). In 93 games with Kansas City prior to being traded, Benintendi batted .320/.387/.398 with 3 home runs and 39 RBIs.

=== New York Yankees (2022) ===
On July 27, 2022, the Royals traded Benintendi to the New York Yankees in exchange for minor league prospects T. J. Sikkema, Chandler Champlain, and Beck Way. On September 2, 2022, Benintendi was hit by a pitch on the right wrist and left the game. The next day, he was put on the 10-day injured list due to right wrist inflammation. Further evidence revealed that Benintendi had broken the hamate bone of his right wrist, which required surgery. In 2022 with the Yankees he batted .254/.331/.404 with 2 home runs in 114 at bats.

=== Chicago White Sox (2023–present) ===
On January 3, 2023, Benintendi signed a five-year, $75 million contract with the Chicago White Sox. Benintendi hit his first home run with the White Sox on June 16 against the Seattle Mariners off of Bryan Woo. In 2023, he batted .262/.326/.356 with five home runs and 45 RBI in 562 at-bats while leading all AL left fielders with four errors.

Benintendi had a power resurgence in the 2024 season, hitting 20 home runs to match his career high set in 2017. However, by other metrics, 2024 was Benintendi's least productive season. His batting average (.229) and on-base percentage (.289) were career lows for a full season. Coupled with below-average defense in left field, Benintendi registered a negative wins above replacement for the first time in his career, excluding the 2020 COVID-shortened season.

On February 27, 2025, it was announced that Benintendi would miss 4–6 weeks with a non-displaced fracture in his right hand, an injury suffered when he was hit by a pitch during a spring training game. He returned in time for opening day on March 27, hitting a three-run home run in the White Sox's 8–1 win over the Los Angeles Angels. On March 31, Benintendi hit his 100th career home run with a three-run home run off Minnesota Twins starter Chris Paddack. On April 9, Benintendi was placed on the 10-day injured list due to a left adductor strain. He made his return on April 17 against the Athletics where he went 0–of–2. On April 18, Benintendi recorded his 500th RBI when he hit a solo home run off of Hunter Dobbins of the Boston Red Sox in the top of the fourth inning. On May 7, Benintendi was placed on the 10-day injured list for the second time in the season due to a left calf strain. He made his return on May 23 versus the Texas Rangers where he went 0–for–2 with an RBI walk. On September 23, the White Sox announced that Benintendi was suffering from left Achilles tendinitis and would miss the rest of the regular season. He finished the season with a .240 batting average, 20 home runs, 63 RBI, and a .738 OPS in 116 games.

On June 18, 2026, Benintendi hit a pinch–hit grand slam off of Camilo Doval of the New York Yankees.

== Personal life ==
Benintendi's paternal grandparents immigrated to the United States from Castellammare del Golfo, Sicily, Italy, where they settled and lived on Lama Court in Gravesend, Brooklyn. He grew up a Cincinnati Reds fan.

Benintendi resides in St. Louis during the offseason and, during the 2019 Stanley Cup Finals, he supported the St. Louis Blues.
