= Claude Bonin-Pissarro =

French painter and graphic designer (1921–2021)

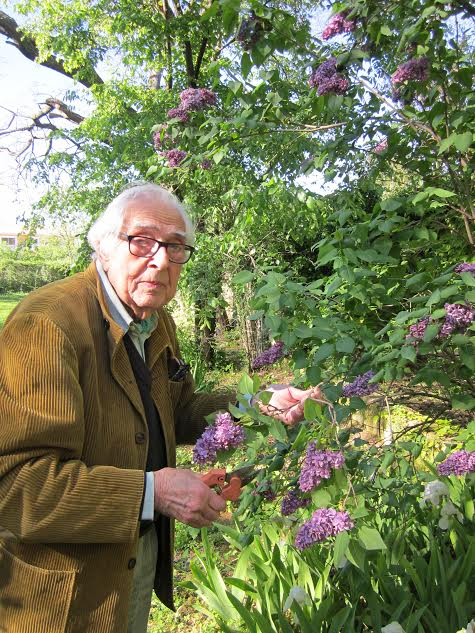
- Born: 11 July 1921; Houilles, France
- Died: 21 July 2021 (aged 100); Montpellier, France
- Known for: Painting

Jean Claude Michel Bonin-Pissarro (11 July 1921 – 21 July 2021) was a French painter and graphic designer.

== Biography ==
He was the son of Jeanne Pissarro (1881–1948) and the grandson of painter Camille Pissarro (1830–1903). He was also the father of French painter Frédéric Bonin-Pissarro.

Bonin-Pissarro died in July 2021, at the age of 100.
