= New Miami High School (Hamilton, Ohio) =

Location
- 600 Seven Mile Avenue; Hamilton, (Butler County), Ohio 45011; United States
- Coordinates: 39°26′22″N 84°32′12″W

Information
- Type: Public, Coeducational high school
- Motto: THE NEW MIAMI VIKING WAY... I Will Be Ready, I Will Be Responsible, I Will Be Respectful, I Will Be Safe
- Superintendent: Rhonda Parker
- Principal: Justin Griffin
- Teaching staff: 15.00 (FTE)
- Grades: 9-12
- Student to teacher ratio: 10.27
- Colors: Green and White
- Slogan: Home of the Vikings
- Athletics conference: Miami Valley Conference
- Sports: Football, Volleyball, Basketball, Baseball, Softball, Track & Field, Cheerleading
- Mascot: Vikings
- Team name: Vikings
- Website: School Website

New Miami High School is a public high school just outside New Miami, Ohio. It is the only high school in the New Miami Local School District.
