= Summit Country Day School =

Private, college preparatory school in Cincinnati, Ohio, United States

The Summit Country Day School
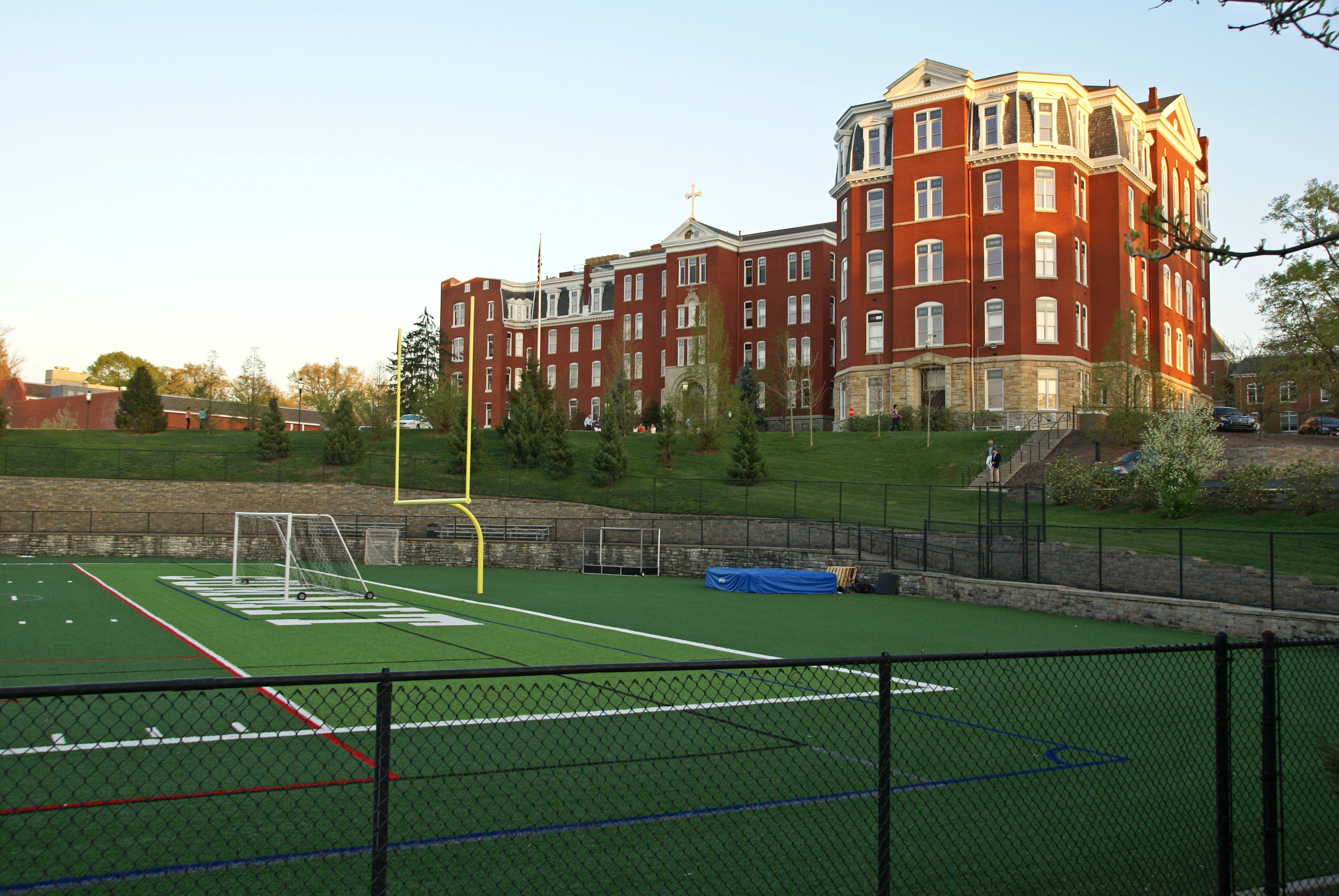

Location
- 2161 Grandin Road; Cincinnati, (Hamilton County), Ohio 45208; United States; 39°7′46.7″N 84°27′33.93″W

Information
- Type: Private, college preparatory
- Motto: Educating Leaders of Character since 1890
- Religious affiliation: Roman Catholic
- Established: 1890
- Head of school: Kelley Schiess
- Faculty: 174
- Grades: Pre-K–12
- Enrollment: 1,055 (2018–19)
- Student to teacher ratio: 10:1
- Campus size: 40 acres (160,000 m^{2})
- Colors: Silver and Blue
- Athletics conference: Miami Valley Conference
- Mascot: Silver Knights
- Accreditation: North Central Association of Colleges and Schools
- Publication: The Summit Magazine
- Yearbook: Rostrum
- Head of upper school: Kelly Cronin
- Website: www.summitcds.org

The Summit Country Day School is a private, Roman Catholic, PreK–12 co-educational school located in Cincinnati, Ohio, United States. In 2021, enrollment is 1,055 students from ages 18 months through 12th grade. Although located within the Archdiocese of Cincinnati, the school is run by the board of trustees and head of school.

== Background ==
The Summit Country Day School was founded in 1890 by the Sisters of Notre Dame de Namur as a school for girls. The Summit Boys Middle School opened in 1941 and the upper school began admitting boys in 1972. In 1980, the school became a private, Catholic, independent school when an independent board of trustees assumed operations. Edward Tyrrell was named headmaster, the first layperson to lead the school, and retired in 2003 after 33 years of service to the Summit.

The Summit is accredited by the National Association of Independent Schools, Ohio Association of Independent Schools, Independent Schools Association of the Central States and other agencies. The Summit continues to endorse the Hallmarks of a Notre Dame Education and maintains a relationship with the Sisters of Notre Dame de Namur.

The school has four divisions. The Montessori program serves ages 18 months to kindergarten. The Lower School serves Grades 1–4. Middle School is Grades 5–8. Upper School is Grades 9–12.

Rich Wilson served as head of school from 2010 through 2022. Following his retirement, Kelley Schiess has succeeded Rich Wilson as head of school as of July 1, 2022.

== Architecture ==
Summit's main building, designed by architect Edwin Forrest Durang, was first constructed in 1890, then renovated in 1930. It was built in the Gothic Revival style and includes a chapel with seating for 500.

In 1960 the school added a primary school building. In 1996, construction of a new middle school building was completed and the boys and girls middle schools were combined into one co-ed program. The athletic complex near Interstate 71 also opened in 1996.

In 2003 Summit began another project at an estimated initial cost of $20 million to renovate many sections of the school, and build a new stadium, parking lot, and lower school. In 2004, the school suffered a partial collapse after excavation for an adjacent foundation wall undermined the structure. A renovation and expansion in 2015 included construction of a new a five-floor wing, renovation of all science labs in the middle and upper schools, expansion of the upper school library, and construction of an upper school art room and additional classrooms.

In 2017, Pat and Joe Perin donated two antique brass candelabra to the school, items salvaged from the Albee Theater. The candelabra were made for John Jacob Astor IV, the wealthy financier, and stood outside the entrance to the dining hall of his New York mansion. Astor perished during the sinking of the Titanic.

== Programs and activities ==
The Summit Country Day Latin Club is a local chapter of both the Ohio Junior Classical League (OJCL) and National Junior Classical League (NJCL). Summit Country Day holds the distinction of being the first Latin club to win the OJCL Convention state title after nearly three decades of consecutive wins from rival Stow-Munroe Falls. Prior to Summit's 2007 win, no other OJCL Latin Club had won the Overall Sweepstakes trophy since 1979 (the start of Stow's 28-year win streak). Summit went on to win the top prize again in 2009 and 2010.

There are two academic centers in the high school, The Schiff Family Science Research Center and the Homan Center for Entrepreneurial Leadership.

== Athletics ==
There is an athletic program for students beginning in kindergarten. Until Grade 7, the coaches are parent volunteers. In the high school, Summit fields varsity sports teams in 20 sports across three seasons. The school competes within the Ohio High School Athletic Association and the Miami Valley Conference. Summit has a "no cut" policy for athletics.

=== Ohio High School Athletic Association state championships ===
- Boys' 4x200m relay - 2022
- Boys' Baseball – 1995
- Boys' Soccer – 1999, 2012, 2013, 2015, 2016, 2017, 2018, 2024, 2025
- Boys' Basketball – 2012
- Girls' Soccer - 2011, 2015, 2017, 2023, 2024, 2025
- Boys' Cross Country - 2019

=== Other state championships ===
- Boys Lacrosse - 2006 (Division II Ohio High School Lacrosse Association)

== Notable alumni ==
- Austin Berry, former professional soccer player with the Chicago Fire and Philadelphia Union, who won the 2012 MLS Rookie of the Year Award.
- Ciara Bravo, actress
- Joan Brugge, Director of the Ludwig Center at Harvard Medical School
- Dustin Cohen, former NFL linebacker with the St. Louis Rams, Super Bowl XXXVI
- Cynthia Hogan, political advisor who served as counsel to Joe Biden from 2009 to 2013
- Xavier Johnson, wide receiver for the Cincinnati Bengals
- Graham Nicholson, kicker for the Miami RedHawks
- Osagie Obasogie, professor at University of California, Berkeley
- Lindsay Reynolds, former Chief of Staff for First Lady Melania Trump
- Kathleen Sebelius, former Governor of Kansas, and former Secretary of Health and Human Services in the Obama administration
- Amy Yasbeck, actress

== See also ==
- Country Day School movement
- Education in the United States
- Progressive education
