= Cincinnati Country Day School =

School in Indian Hill, Ohio, United States

CCDS
- Cincinnati Country Day School
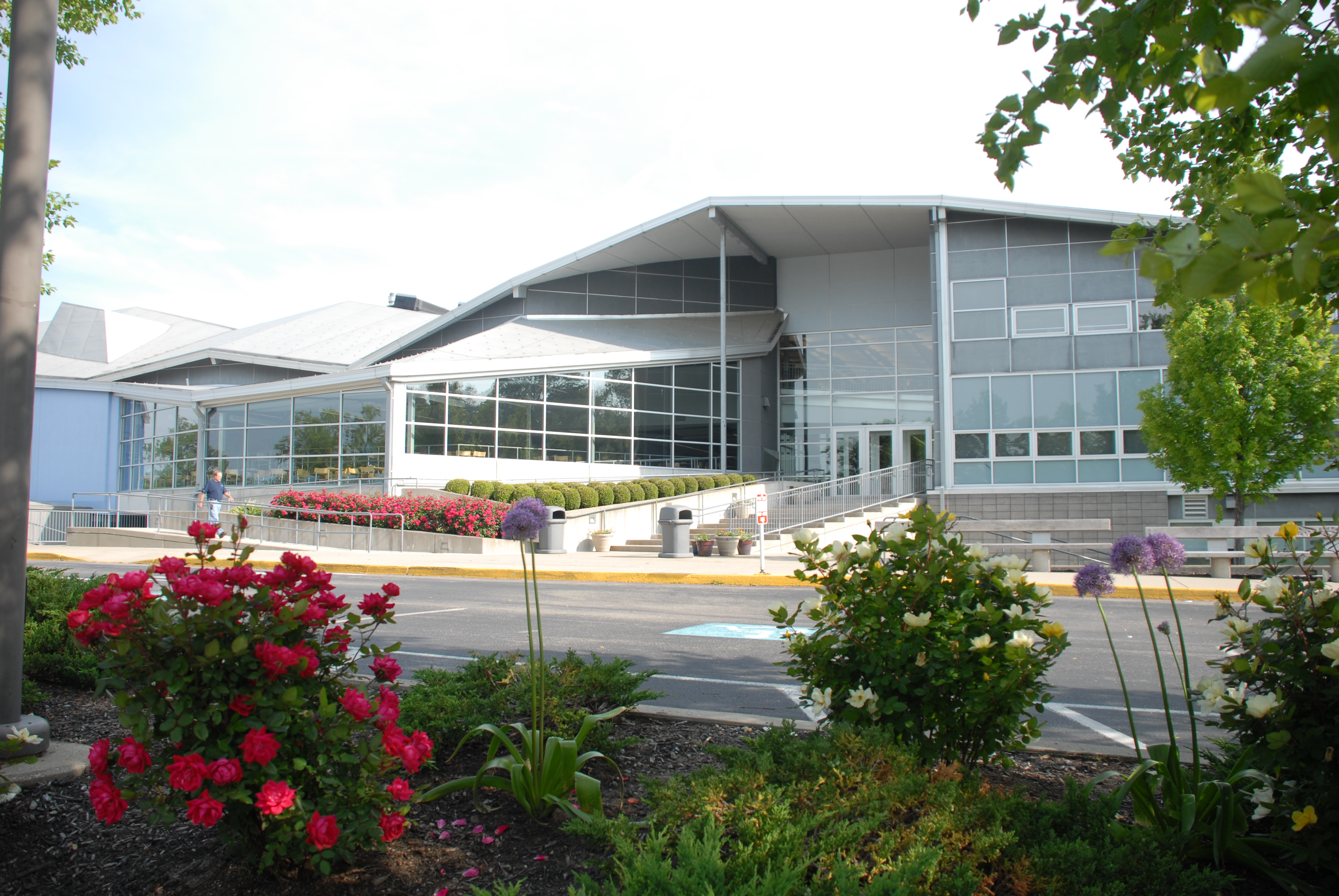

Location
- 6905 Given Road; Cincinnati, (Hamilton County), Ohio 45243; United States; 39°11′11″N 84°19′40″W

Information
- Type: Private, coeducational, college preparatory
- Motto: “Virtue in Action”
- Established: 1926
- Head of school: Rob Zimmerman
- Staff: 40
- Faculty: 110
- Grades: PK–12
- Enrollment: 850
- Average class size: 15
- Student to teacher ratio: 9:1
- Campus size: 60 acres
- Colors: Blue and white
- Athletics conference: Miami Valley Conference
- Mascot: Nighthawks
- Accreditation: American Montessori Society, Cum Laude Society, Independent School Association of the Central States, Miami Valley Conference, National Association of College Admission Counseling, National Association of Independent Schools, Ohio Association of College Admission Counseling, Ohio Association of Independent Schools, Ohio Department of Education, Ohio High School Athletic Association
- Newspaper: The Scroll
- Tuition: $9,560 - $33,540
- Upper School Principal: Jon Zeljo
- Middle School Principal: Theresa Hirschauer
- Lower School Principal: Mark Morawski
- Website: https://www.countryday.net/

Cincinnati Country Day School (abbreviated CCDS) is a private, coeducational, independent school located in Indian Hill, Ohio, a suburb of Cincinnati.

== History ==
Cincinnati Country Day School was founded in 1926 and was inspired by the Country Day School movement, which had started in Baltimore 20 years earlier. The school sits on a 60-acre (240,000 m^{2}) campus in Indian Hill, Ohio. Starting in the fall of 1996, students 5th grade and above were equipped with laptop computers as part of the "Anytime Anywhere Learning" program.

== Academics ==
The school enrolls approximately 850 students from early childhood through high school (with a maximum of 75 per grade level). There are approximately 350 students in the lower school (grades PreK-4), 200 in the middle school (grades 5–8), and 300 in the upper school (grades 9-12).

Niche.com ranked the school as the #1 best private high school, #1 best private K-12 school, and #1 best high school for STEM in the Cincinnati area for 2024. Country Day is ranked as the #5 private school in Ohio as of 2025. Polaris ranked Country Day the #1 school in Cincinnati for sending students to Harvard, Princeton, and MIT. Cincinnati Country Day School has been awarded “Platinum with Access” in the 2023 AP School Honor Roll, issued by the College Board.

Each year, 100% of graduating seniors attend four-year colleges. Fifteen percent of the class of 2021 was National Merit recognized. In 2020, 103 students in the middle and upper schools received gold, silver, bronze, and platinum status on the National French Contest and the National Spanish Exam. The school sits on a 60-acre (240,000 m^{2}) campus in Indian Hill, Ohio. The school newspaper, called The Scroll (www.scrollonline.net) is part of the National Scholastic Press Association.

== Athletics ==
Cincinnati Country Day fields 53 teams in 15 sports, with 22 varsity teams. The school is accredited by the Ohio High School Athletic Association and participates in the Miami Valley Conference.

=== OHSAA State Championships ===
- Boys Baseball - 1993, 2001
- Girls Soccer - 2018, 2019, 2022, 2023
- As of 2022, CCD has won 27 Individual State Championships (14 Boys Tennis, 8 Track & Field, 4 Swimming, 1 Golf)

==== Non-OHSAA Championships ====
- Boys Tennis - 2014, 2015
- Boys Lacrosse - 2001, 2005 (Ohio High School Lacrosse Association)
- Rowing - Six National Championship Appearances, Four National Championships

== Facilities ==
The 60-acre campus includes an Early Childhood Center, four playgrounds, an outdoor playscape and education area with mini ponies, a donkey, rabbit, and chickens. Other outdoor facilities include an outdoor performing arts area and amphitheater, seven athletic playing fields, seven tennis courts and pavilion and a track. Additionally, there is an Athletic Center containing a six-lane swimming pool, as well as two full-sized gymnasiums in two separate locations on campus. Academic facilities include a student commons, student lounge, two libraries, two Makerspaces, a 540-seat theater, state-of-the-art science laboratories and a telescope. There is also a visual arts studio with a darkroom and digital imaging area. Other amenities are conference and meeting spaces, and a wirelessly connected campus and classrooms.

== Notable alumni ==
- Aaron Dessner, co-founder of The National
- Bryce Dessner, co-founder of The National
- David Freiberg, member of Quicksilver Messenger Service, Jefferson Airplane, and Jefferson Starship
- Jeannine Hall Gailey, poet
- Joe Hagin, former White House Deputy Chief of Staff
- Michael Hill, senior vice president of on-field operations for Major League Baseball
- Harry Jackson, Evangelical Christian social conservative leader
- Ashley Kahn, music historian, journalist, and producer
- Alan Light, journalist and critic
- David Pepper, former chairman of the Ohio Democratic Party
- Rob Portman, former U.S. Senator from Ohio, Director of the Office of Management and Budget, U.S. Trade Representative, and member of the United States House of Representatives
- Robert Shetterly, artist
- John Simon, president, Lehigh University
- Veena Sud, TV writer and producer
- Bob Taft, former Governor of Ohio and Ohio Secretary of State
- Patricia Taft, interior designer
- J. J. Wolf, professional tennis player
