= Cincinnati Public Schools =

School district in Ohio

Coordinates: 39°07′49.6″N 84°30′08.2″W

Location
- Cincinnati, Ohio, United States

District information
- Type: City school district
- Grades: PreK–12
- Established: 1829; 197 years ago
- Superintendent: Shauna Murphy
- Accreditations: AdvancED, Ohio Department of Education

Students and staff
- Students: 35,585 (2022–23)

Other information
- Website: www.cps-k12.org

Cincinnati Public Schools (often abbreviated CPS) is the U.S. state of Ohio's second largest public school district, by enrollment, after Columbus City Schools. Cincinnati Public Schools is the largest Ohio school district rated as 'effective'. Founded in 1829 as the Common Schools of Cincinnati, it is governed by the Cincinnati Board of Education.

In addition to Cincinnati, the district includes Amberley, Golf Manor, Ridgewood, most of Silverton, and a portion of Fairfax. It also includes sections of Columbia Township.

== History ==
Hiram S. Gilmore established what became known as Gilmore High School in 1844 for African American students in Cincinnati. Public high schools including Gaines High School administered by a "colored" school board followed but were the subject of litigation.

== Geography ==
The Cincinnati Public School District covers an area of 91 square miles including all of the City of Cincinnati, Amberley Village, Cheviot and Golf Manor; most of the City of Silverton; parts of Fairfax and Wyoming; and small parts of Anderson, Columbia, Delhi, Green, Springfield and Sycamore townships.

== Schools ==
Cincinnati Public Schools operates 66 schools, including 42 elementary schools, 6 middle schools, 18 high schools, and 4 combined K-12 schools.

=== Elementary schools ===
- Academy of Multilingual Immersion Studies (Preschool–8)
- Academy of World Languages (Preschool–8)
- Bond Hill Academy (Preschool–6)
- Carson School (Preschool–6)
- Chase School (Preschool–6)
- Cheviot School (Preschool–6)
- Clifton Area Neighborhood School (Preschool–6)
- College Hill Fundamental Academy (Preschool–6)
- Covedale School (K–6)
- Dater Montessori School (Preschool–6)
- Fairview-Clifton German Language School (Preschool–6)
- Frederick Douglass School (Preschool–5)
- Hays-Porter School (Preschool–6)
- Hyde Park School (K–6)
- James N. Gamble Montessori Elementary School (Preschool–6)
- John P. Parker School (Preschool–6)
- Kilgour School (K–6)
- LEAP Academy (Preschool–4)
- Midway School (Preschool–6)
- Mt. Airy School (Preschool–6)
- Mt. Washington School (Preschool–6)
- North Avondale Montessori School (Preschool–6)
- Parker Woods Montessori School (Preschool–6)
- Pleasant Ridge Montessori School (Preschool–6)
- Rees E. Price Academy (Preschool–6)
- Rising Stars at Carthage (Preschool–1)
- Roberts Academy (Preschool–8)
- Rockdale Academy (Preschool-6)
- Roll Hill Academy (Preschool–6)
- Roselawn Condon School (Preschool–8)
- Rothenberg Preparatory Academy (Preschool–6)
- Sands Montessori School (Preschool–6)
- Sayler Park School (Preschool–8)
- Silverton Paideia Academy (Preschool–6)
- Westwood School (Preschool–6)
- William H. Taft School (Preschool–6)
- Winton Hills Academy (Preschool–6)
- Woodford Academy (Preschool–6)

=== Middle/Junior high schools ===
- Shroder Middle School
- Ethel M. Taylor Junior High School
- Evanston Junior High School
- Hartwell Middle School
- Pleasant Hill Middle School
- South Avondale Middle School

=== Secondary and K–12 schools ===
- Aiken New Tech High School (9–12)
- John J. Gilligan Digital Academy(9–12)
- Clark Montessori High School (7–12)
- Gilbert A. Dater High School (7–12)
- James N. Gamble Montessori High School (7–12)
- Hughes STEM High School (9–12)
- Dr. O'dell Owens Center for Learning (9-12)
- Oyler School (Preschool–12)
- Riverview East Academy (Preschool–12)
- School for Creative and Performing Arts (SCPA) (K–12)
- Shroder High School (9–12)
- Spencer Center for Gifted and Exceptional Students (3–12)
- Robert A. Taft Information Technology High School (7–12)
- Virtual High School (Cincinnati, Ohio) (9–12)
- Walnut Hills High School (7–12)
- Western Hills University High School (9–12)
- Withrow University High School (9–12)
- Woodward Career Technical High School (9–12)

=== Satellite schools ===
- Hospital/Satellite Program Office (9–12)
- Juvenile Detention Center (9–12)
- The Promise Center (4–6)
- The Promise Center— High School (9–12)

== See also ==
- List of high schools in Cincinnati, Ohio
