= Liberty Bible Academy =

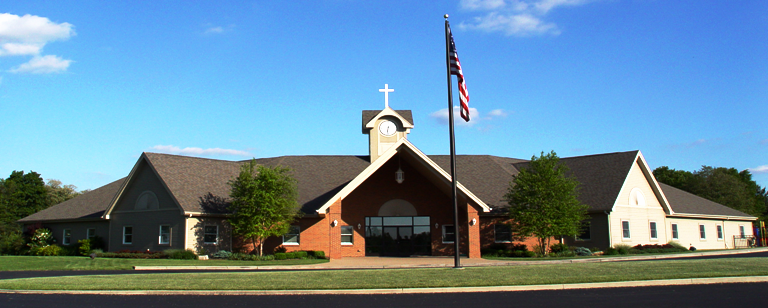
- Liberty Bible Academy, Mason Ohio

Location
- 4900 Old Irwin Simpson Road; Mason, (Warren County), Ohio 45040; United States; 39°18′26.9″N 84°18′42.2″W

Information
- Type: Private Christian
- Motto: Love. Believe. Achieve.
- Religious affiliation: Non-denominational Christian
- Established: 1984
- Founder: Dean and Ona Truesdale
- Principal: Dana Garwood
- Teaching staff: 19.9 FTE
- Grades: PK–12
- Gender: Coed
- Enrollment: 277 (2021–22)
- Student to teacher ratio: 11.1
- Campus: Suburban/Urban
- Colors: Navy blue and White
- Sports: men's basketball, women's basketball, women's volleyball, cross country
- Accreditation: Association of Christian Schools International Ohio Department of Education
- Communities served: Deerfield Township, Mason, West Chester, Loveland
- Website: www.libertybibleacademy.org

Liberty Bible Academy is a private Christian school located in the Mason, Ohio, area. Its campus is located in Deerfield Township, just off Mason-Montgomery Road across from the Procter and Gamble Research facility and Deerfield Township Shopping Center;

LBA is a non-denominational school, not affiliated with a particular church or religious group, though its religious teachings is based in Protestant theology.

== History ==
=== Overview ===
The school was founded in 1984 by Dean and Ona Truesdale. After leasing facilities for its early years, Liberty Bible Academy moved to its new home in Mason/Deerfield Township in the summer of 1999. It is a member of the Association of Christian Schools International and is chartered by the Ohio Department of Education.

== Academics ==
Teachings are oriented toward evangelical Christianity. All students are involved with Chapel services throughout the week and are required to take Bible class.

== Fine arts ==
General Music instruction is offered to most grade levels within the school as part of the regular curriculum. Each class is introduced to academic and skill development while being exposed to various types of music. Private piano instruction for all students are offered with lesson times given both during and after school hours. Band is offered for all students 5–8. Art is taught weekly to all students PK–8 which introduces new art concepts, tools and techniques. Students receive recognition at the annual ACSI Art Festival.

== Activities ==
Students are given the opportunity to participate in a wide range of Activities such as Men's Basketball, Women's Basketball, Women's Volleyball, Jazz Band, Worship Band, Band, and Art.
