= St. Bernard–Elmwood Place High School =

St. Bernard High School

Location
- 4615 Tower Avenue; St. Bernard, (Hamilton County), Ohio 45217; United States
- Coordinates: 39°10′1″N 84°29′49″W

Information
- Type: Public, Coeducational high school
- School district: St. Bernard City Schools
- Superintendent: Mimi Webb
- Principal: Bret Bohannon
- Teaching staff: 28.00 (FTE)
- Grades: 7-12
- Student to teacher ratio: 12.07
- Colors: Black and Gold
- Fight song: 'On You Titans!'
- Athletics conference: Miami Valley Conference
- Mascot: Titan
- Team name: Titans
- Rival: Lockland Panthers, Roger Bacon Spartans
- Accreditation: North Central Association of Colleges and Schools
- Website: http://www.sbepschools.org/

St. Bernard-Elmwood Place High School is a public high school in St. Bernard, Ohio. It is the only public high school in the St. Bernard City School District.

== Athletics ==
The Titans are a member of the Miami Valley Conference.
