= Oyler High School =

Location
- 2121 Hatmaker St. Cincinnati, (Hamilton County), Ohio 45204-1947; United States
- Coordinates: 40°06′14.2″N 84°33′05″W

Information
- Type: Public, Coeducational high school
- School district: Cincinnati Public Schools
- Superintendent: Mary A. Ronan
- Principal: Michael Allison
- Grades: 9-12 (building is K-12)
- Colors: Black & White
- Athletics conference: Independent
- Team name: Hatmakers
- Website: http://oyler.cps-k12.org/

Oyler High School is a public high school in Cincinnati, Ohio and one of many schools that make up the Cincinnati Public School District. While undergoing renovations at its location on Hatmaker Street, Oyler was temporarily housed in the former Roberts School at 1700 Grand Avenue.

The Oyler Hatmakers wear black and white and are currently independent of a league.

== Racism Controversy ==
At a basketball game on January 15, 2021, accusations of racism toward Oyler players by parents and students from New Miami were made public.
