= Lockland High School =

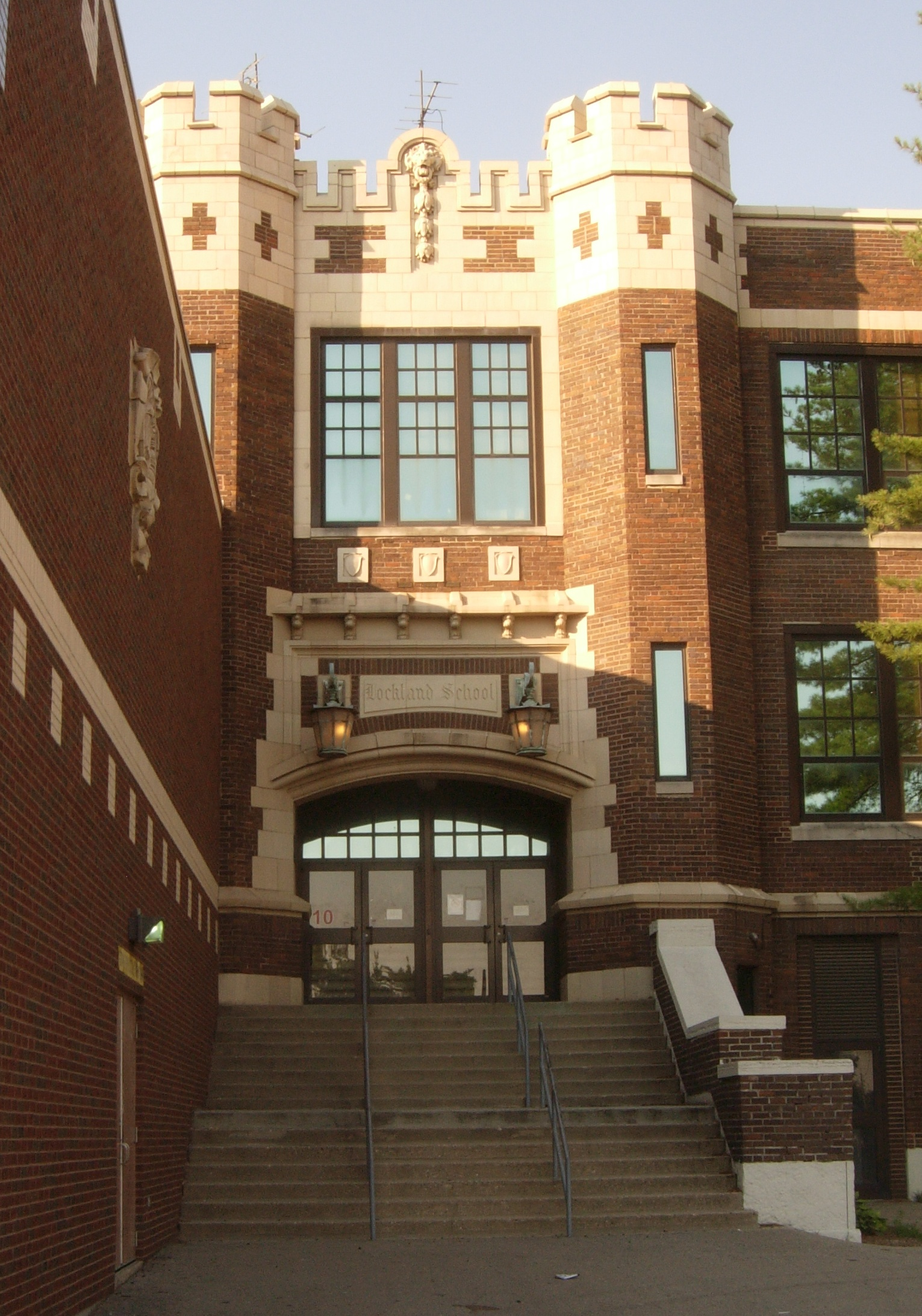

Location
- 249 West Forrer Avenue; Lockland, (Hamilton County), Ohio 45215; United States; 39°13′40″N 84°27′6″W

Information
- Type: Public, co-educational high school
- School district: Lockland Local School District
- Superintendent: Bob Longworth
- Principal: Karen Louis
- Teaching staff: 10.99 (FTE)
- Grades: 7-12
- Student to teacher ratio: 22.38
- Colors: Navy and gold
- Athletics conference: Miami Valley Conference
- Mascot: Panther
- Team name: Panthers
- Accreditation: North Central Association of Colleges and Schools
- Website: www.locklandschools.org

Lockland High School is a public high school in Lockland, Ohio, USA. It is the only High School in the Lockland Local School District. The school has open enrollment, meaning students are not required to live inside the Lockland Local School District.

== Athletics ==
Lockland's sports teams are known as the Panthers. The Panthers are a member of the Miami Valley Conference's Scarlet Division. Prior to joining the MVC, Lockland was a member of the Fort Ancient Valley Conference.

=== Ohio High School Athletic Association State Championships ===
- Boys Baseball – 1955
- Boys Track and Field – 1945
- Boys Basketball* - 1952, 1955

* Titles won by Lockland Wayne High School prior to desegregation/consolidation with Lockland HS in 1958.
