= Madeira City School District =

School district in Ohio

Madeira City School District is a school district in Madeira, Ohio, a suburb of Cincinnati. It includes:

== Schools ==
- Madeira Elementary School
- Madeira Middle School
- Madeira High School
