= Gamble Montessori High School =

James N. Gamble Montessori High School

Location
- 3036 Werk Road; Cincinnati, Ohio 45211; United States
- 39°8′52″N 84°35′07″W

Information
- Type: Public high school
- Motto: A Commitment To Learning Every Day
- Established: 2005
- School district: Cincinnati Public Schools
- NCES School ID: 390437505375
- Principal: Brandon Frimming
- Teaching staff: 45.71 (on an FTE basis)
- Grades: 7-12
- Enrollment: 716 (2023-2024)
- Student to teacher ratio: 15.66
- Colors: Green, purple, and blue
- Mascot: Gator
- Nickname: The Swamp, Gamble
- Website: gamblemontessorihs.cps-k12.org

James N. Gamble Montessori High School (less formally known as Gamble Montessori) is a public high school in Cincinnati, Ohio, United States. It is part of the Cincinnati Public Schools district, one of two Montessori high schools.

== History ==
Increasing demand for secondary Montessori education in the city prompted the creation of this program, the second Montessori public junior high/high school in Cincinnati Public Schools, in 2005. Beginning with a 7th grade class, the school expanded by one grade level every year and now serves grades 7-12. Gamble Montessori's first class of seniors graduated in May, 2011.

The program was originally housed in the Dater Montessori Elementary School building, before moving to the Jacobs Center in the fall of 2007, when it was renamed Westside Montessori High School. In early 2010 the school’s LSDMC (Local School Decision-Making Committee) voted to change the school’s name to James N. Gamble Montessori High School, and the school board approved this name change on March 29, 2010.

On April 30, 2012, the CPS Board of Education approved taking out a $26.8 million loan for green renovations of several schools, including $6.9 million for Gamble Montessori. In 2018, Cincinnati Public Schools purchased the current building for the price of $2.85 million. The building is the former Mother of Mercy High School. After refurbishment, Gamble Montessori High School started its first year there in August 2019.

== James N. Gamble ==
James N. Gamble (1836-1932) was the son of James Gamble, one of the founders of Procter & Gamble, James N. Gamble donated the funds to finish construction of a new football stadium at the University of Cincinnati (Nippert Stadium) named in memory of his grandson.
