= The Art Institute of Cincinnati =

Former art school in Cincinnati, Ohio

Coordinates: 39°17′09″N 84°27′05″W

- Type: Private college
- Active: 1976–2019
- Affiliations: ICDS ACCSCT
- President: Marion Allman
- Location: Cincinnati, Ohio, United States
- Campus: Urban
- Website: www.aic-arts.edu

The Art Institute of Cincinnati, also known as AIC College of Design, and earlier as ACA College of Design (Academy of Communicative Art) was a private for-profit art school in Cincinnati, Ohio. It was accredited by the Accrediting Commission of Career Schools & Colleges of Technology (ACCSCT). It was founded as ACA or the Academy of Creative Arts. It's curriculum offered an associate degree in Illustration or Graphic Design as well as a three-year bachelor's degree of Graphic Design. The institution closed in 2019.

== History ==
Founded in 1976 by Marion K. Allman and Cyndi A. Mendell the school was based on the need for a practical, innovative curriculum; a course that kept up with the times. The historic Gruen building was the first home of the college before purchasing a building in E. Walnut Hills. It was moved again with the acquisition of the Tri-county facility

In 1979, the school received accreditation and in 1983 became a charter member of The International Council of Design Schools (ICDS).

In 1990-92, the school offered a two-year diploma in Illustration, or Graphic Design.
