= Madeira, Ohio =

- City
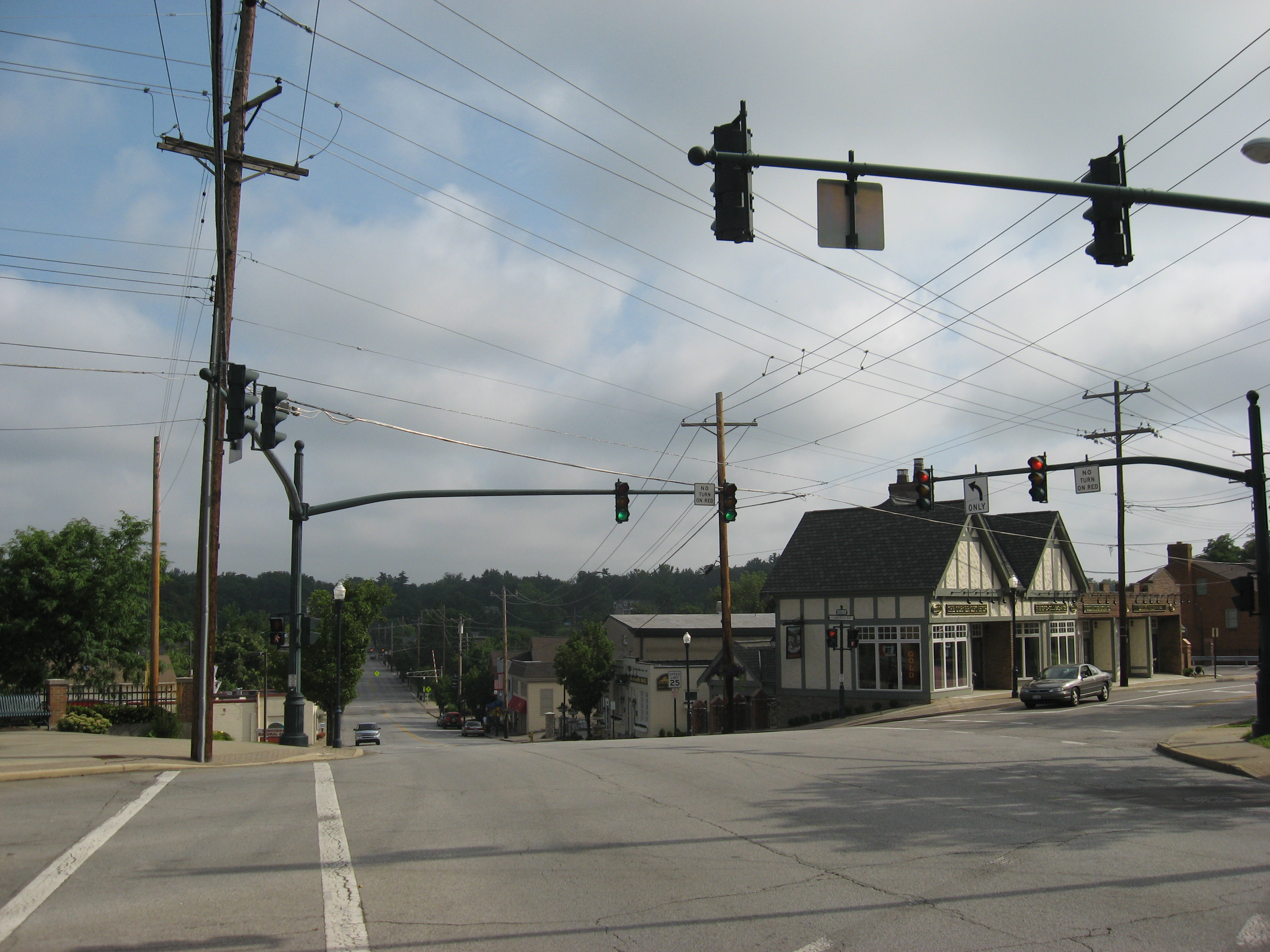
- Downtown Madeira
- Interactive map of Madeira, Ohio
- Location within Ohio Location within the United States
- Coordinates: 39°10′55″N 84°22′46″W
- Country: United States
- State: Ohio
- County: Hamilton

Government
  - Mayor: Tom Henning

Area
  - Total: 3.36 sq mi (8.69 km^{2})
  - Land: 3.35 sq mi (8.68 km^{2})
  - Water: 0.0039 sq mi (0.01 km^{2})
- Elevation: 820 ft (250 m)

Population (2020)
  - Total: 9,487
  - Estimate (2022): 9,414
  - Density: 2,830.8/sq mi (1,092.97/km^{2})
- Time zone: UTC-5 (Eastern (EST))
  - Summer (DST): UTC-4 (EDT)
- ZIP code: 45243
- Area code: 513
- FIPS code: 39-46312
- GNIS feature ID: 1086218
- Website: www.madeiracity.com

Madeira is a city in Hamilton County, Ohio, United States. The population was 9,487 at the 2020 census. A residential suburb of Cincinnati, Madeira has a small downtown and some light industry.

== History ==
Madeira was largely laid out in 1871. Before this time the place was known as a post town, and was named for John Madeira who owned a large tract of land in the vicinity.

Madeira was incorporated as a village under the statutes of the State of Ohio in 1910. The village was protected by a series of elected marshals and appointed deputy marshals until 1942 when Madeira's first Chief of Police was appointed.

Madeira gained city status in August 1959. The city nearly doubled in area with the 1970 annexation of the South Kenwood area of Columbia Township.

In August 1969, a violent F3 tornado hit Madeira, killing four people and causing more than $3 million in damages. Later, Mayor Dan McDonald declared the city a disaster area.

== Geography ==
According to the United States Census Bureau, the city has a total area of 3.38 square miles (8.75 km^{2}), all land.

It is bordered by:

- Indian Hill to the east
- Columbia Township to the south
- Cincinnati (Madisonville) to the south and west
- Silverton to the west
- Sycamore Township to the north

== Demographics ==
Historical population
Census	Pop.	Note	%±
1920	600		—
1930	1,162		93.7%
1940	1,384		19.1%
1950	2,689		94.3%
1960	6,744		150.8%
1970	6,713		−0.5%
1980	9,341		39.1%
1990	9,141		−2.1%
2000	8,923		−2.4%
2010	8,726		−2.2%
2020	9,487		8.7%
2022 (est.)	9,414		−0.8%

=== 2020 census ===
As of the 2020 census, there were 9,487 people living in the city, for a population density of 2,831.10 people per square mile (1,092.97/km^{2}).

As of the 2020 census, the median age was 39.4 years, 27.7% of residents were under the age of 18, and 17.4% of residents were 65 years of age or older. For every 100 females there were 94.2 males, and for every 100 females age 18 and over there were 90.7 males age 18 and over.

As of the 2020 census, there were 3,415 households in Madeira, of which 40.1% had children under the age of 18 living in them. Of all households, 66.1% were married-couple households, 10.5% were households with a male householder and no spouse or partner present, and 20.1% were households with a female householder and no spouse or partner present. About 20.0% of all households were made up of individuals and 10.6% had someone living alone who was 65 years of age or older.

As of the 2020 census, there were 3,617 housing units, of which 5.6% were vacant. The homeowner vacancy rate was 1.0% and the rental vacancy rate was 16.8%.

As of the 2020 census, 100.0% of residents lived in urban areas, while 0.0% lived in rural areas.

Racial composition as of the 2020 census
Race	Number	Percent
White	8,284	87.3%
Black or African American	182	1.9%
American Indian and Alaska Native	8	0.1%
Asian	300	3.2%
Native Hawaiian and Other Pacific Islander	1	0.0%
Some other race	128	1.3%
Two or more races	584	6.2%
Hispanic or Latino (of any race)	389	4.1%

=== 2016–2020 American Community Survey ===
According to the U.S. Census American Community Survey, for the period 2016-2020 the estimated median annual income for a household in the city was $142,917, and the median income for a family was $168,286. About 1.9% of the population were living below the poverty line, including 0.8% of those under age 18 and 3.8% of those age 65 or over. About 68.9% of the population were employed, and 71.9% had a bachelor's degree or higher.

=== 2010 census ===
As of the census of 2010, there were 8,726 people, 3,297 households, and 2,420 families living in the city. The population density was 2,581.7 inhabitants per square mile (996.8/km^{2}). There were 3,498 housing units at an average density of 1,034.9 per square mile (399.6/km^{2}). The racial makeup of the city was 93.0% White, 2.5% African American, 0.1% Native American, 2.8% Asian, 0.3% from other races, and 1.2% from two or more races. Hispanic or Latino of any race were 2.3% of the population.

There were 3,297 households, of which 36.3% had children under the age of 18 living with them, 62.1% were married couples living together, 8.3% had a female householder with no husband present, 3.0% had a male householder with no wife present, and 26.6% were non-families. 23.7% of all households were made up of individuals, and 10.5% had someone living alone who was 65 years of age or older. The average household size was 2.58 and the average family size was 3.08.

The median age in the city was 42.9 years. 25.6% of residents were under the age of 18; 6% were between the ages of 18 and 24; 21.7% were from 25 to 44; 30.8% were from 45 to 64; and 16% were 65 years of age or older. The gender makeup of the city was 48.1% male and 51.9% female.

=== 2000 census ===
As of the census of 2000, there were 8,923 people, 3,383 households, and 2,472 families living in the city. The population density was 2,651.0 inhabitants per square mile (1,023.6/km^{2}). There were 3,484 housing units at an average density of 1,035.1 per square mile (399.7/km^{2}). The racial makeup of the city was 95.70% White, 1.29% African American, 0.13% Native American, 1.89% Asian, 0.35% from other races, and 0.64% from two or more races. Hispanic or Latino of any race were 0.77% of the population.

There were 3,383 households, out of which 35.8% had children under the age of 18 living with them, 62.9% were married couples living together, 7.7% had a female householder with no husband present, and 26.9% were non-families. 24.7% of all households were made up of individuals, and 12.0% had someone living alone who was 65 years of age or older. The average household size was 2.55 and the average family size was 3.06.

In the city the population was spread out, with 26.7% under the age of 18, 4.3% from 18 to 24, 25.0% from 25 to 44, 24.6% from 45 to 64, and 19.4% who were 65 years of age or older. The median age was 42 years. For every 100 females, there were 89.2 males. For every 100 females age 18 and over, there were 82.8 males.

The median income for a household in the city was $59,626, and the median income for a family was $70,625. Males had a median income of $51,318 versus $38,172 for females. The per capita income for the city was $30,676. About 0.8% of families and 1.3% of the population were below the poverty line, including 0.3% of those under age 18 and 3.3% of those age 65 or over.

== Government ==
Madeira has a Council-Manager form of government, where the elected City Council appoints a paid City Manager to run the day-to-day operations of the city. Madeira is served by its own police department, while fire service is provided by the Madeira-Indian Hill Joint Fire District.

== Education ==
Public education is administered by the Madeira City School District.

== Notable people ==
- Andrew Benintendi, baseball player for the Chicago White Sox
- Clarence DeMar, marathoner
- Caty McNally, tennis player
- John McNally, tennis player
