= Aiken High School (Cincinnati) =

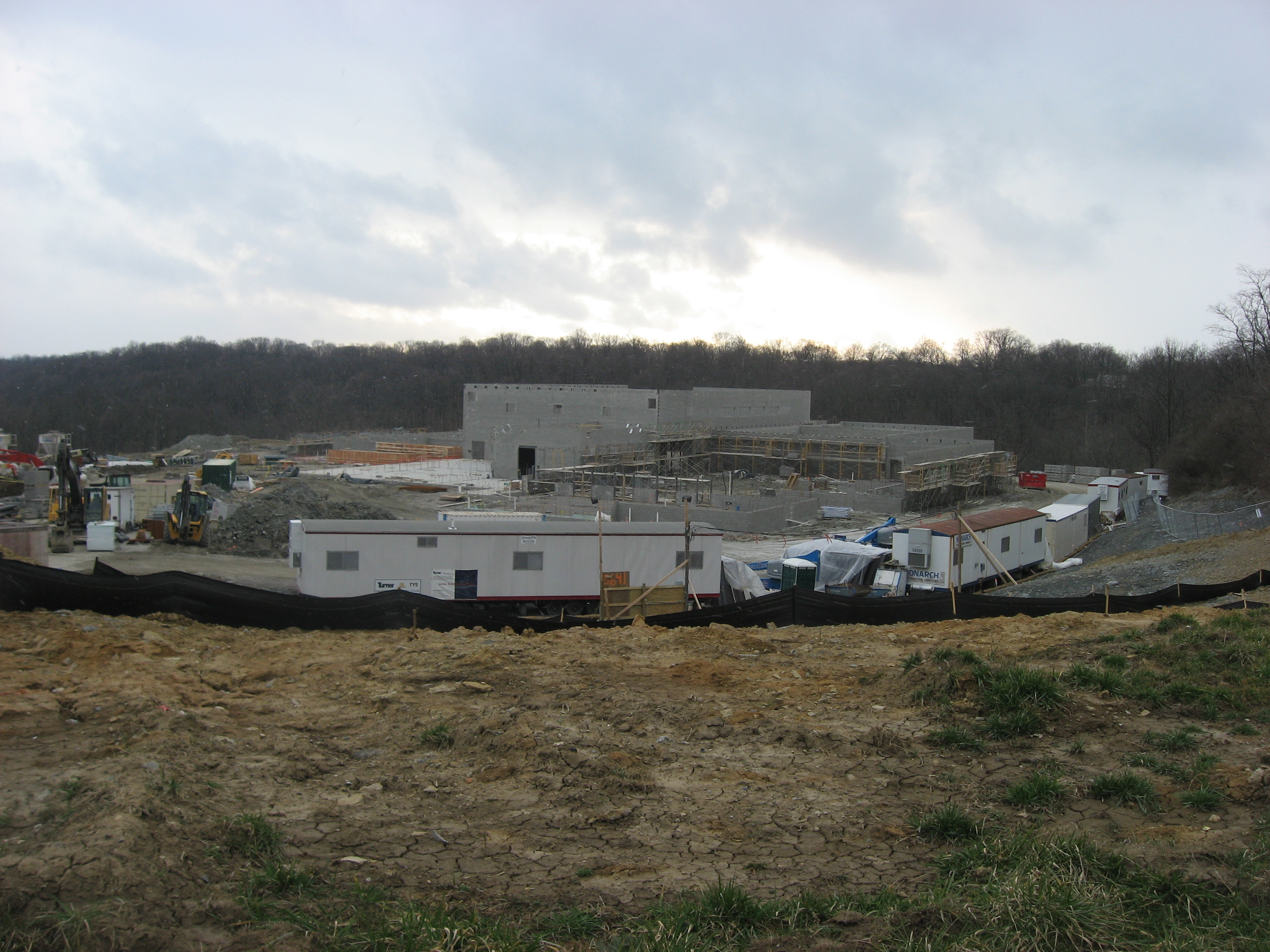
- The new high school under construction in early 2012

Location
- 5641 Belmont Avenue; 5641 Belmont Ave, Cincinnati, Ohio 45224; United States; 39°11′29″N 84°33′4″W

Information
- Type: Public, Coeducational high school
- Established: 1962
- School district: Cincinnati Public Schools
- Superintendent: Shauna Murphy
- Principal: Lisa Votaw
- Teaching staff: 76.19 (FTE)
- Grades: 9-12
- Student to teacher ratio: 15.68
- Colors: Purple and White
- Athletics conference: Cincinnati Metro Athletic Conference
- Mascot: Falcon
- Nickname: Falcons
- Website: Aiken College & Career, Aiken University HS

Aiken High School is a public high school located in Cincinnati, Ohio. The school, which opened in 1962, is part of Cincinnati Public Schools.

Starting with the 1995–1996 school year, the school began a pilot program for Cincinnati Public Schools that keeps student classes together from grade 9 to grade 10. Teachers reported higher retention of ninth-grade students.

== History ==
=== Background ===
Aiken high school was founded in 1962 and is one of the several Cincinnati public high schools. The school's culture has changed severely over time from the early sixties through the eighties. Aiken was a predominantly white school, however, looking at present day demographics, the school is highly diverse. Aiken once housed two educational programs 'Aiken College and Career high school' and 'Aiken University high school', students had the option to learn a trade program such as cosmetology, welding, nursing, and more. Since the school was rebuilt and opened in 2014 in College Hill it is now known as 'Aiken New Tech High School'- focusing primarily on technological skills as technology continues to advance in children's lives. Aiken high school serves children grades 7-12 of multiple ethnicity, disabilities, and backgrounds.

In 2014 along with rebuilding the school, its culture, and its overall name Aiken became partners with New Tech, a partnership that promotes the idea of project based learning, better known as (PBL), project based learning is used in order to encourage self-regulation in students. Project based learning focuses on five overall areas

- Agency
- Oral Communication
- Collaboration
- Written Communication
- Knowledge and thinking skills

== Notable alumni ==
- Chane Behanan — professional basketball player, played for University of Louisville (moved to Bowling Green, Kentucky after sophomore year)
- Dixon Edwards — NFL linebacker
- Carlik Jones — NBA player and Olympian
- Jim O'Brien — NFL placekicker for Super Bowl V champion Baltimore Colts
- Ike Reese — NFL linebacker
- Scott Service — MLB player (Philadelphia Phillies, Montreal Expos, Cincinnati Reds, Colorado Rockies, San Francisco Giants, Kansas City Royals, Oakland Athletics, Arizona Diamondbacks, Toronto Blue Jays)
- Shane Sparks — hip hop choreographer

== See also ==
- List of high schools in Ohio
