= Dater High School =

Gilbert A. Dater High School
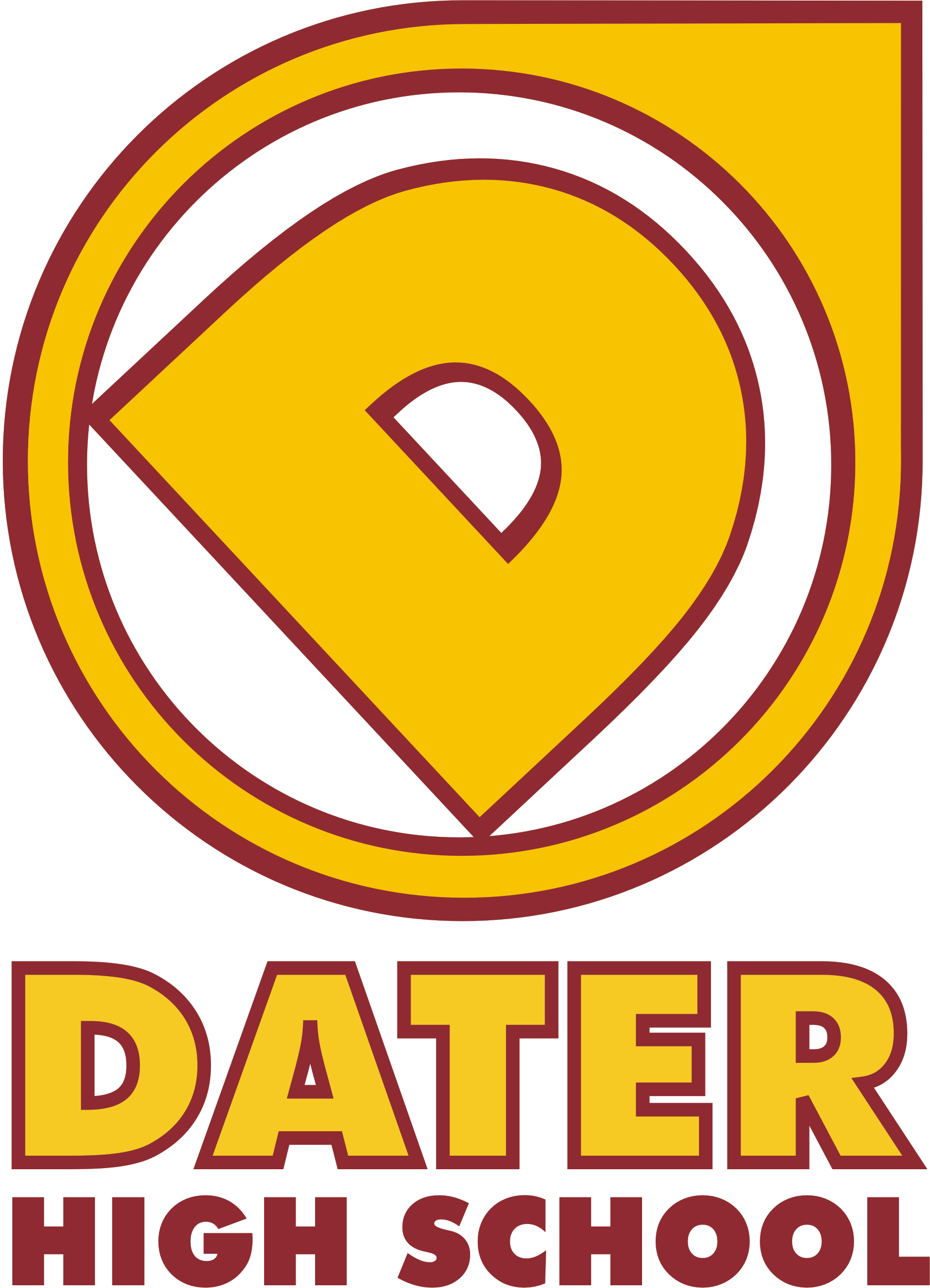

Location
- 2145 Ferguson Road; Cincinnati, Ohio 45238; United States; 39°7′30″N 84°35′55″W

Information
- Type: Public, Coeducational High School
- Established: 2000
- School district: Cincinnati Public Schools
- Superintendent: Shauna Murphy
- Principal: Jasmine B. Madison r
- Teaching staff: 60.75 (FTE)
- Grades: 7-12
- Enrollment: 895 (2023-2024)
- Student to teacher ratio: 14.73
- Campus type: Urban
- Colors: Maroon and Gold
- Slogan: Make Dater Greater/Preparing students for college and beyond
- Athletics: Dater Cougars (Middle School), Western Hills Mustangs (High School)
- Sports: Football, Soccer, Volleyball, Basketball, Baseball, Softball, Cheerleading, Track
- Mascot: Cougar
- Nickname: Dater
- Team name: Cougars
- Communities served: West Side of Cincinnati Ohio
- Alumni: Sgt. Joshua Hargis
- Website: daterhighschool.cps-k12.org

Gilbert A. Dater High School is a public high school, combined with grades 7 and 8, located in the Western Hills area of Cincinnati, Ohio. It is part of the Cincinnati Public Schools. The first graduating class was in 2003.

Gilbert A. Dater High School is located on the west side of Cincinnati. The school currently serves students in grades 7–12.

From 1967 to 1999 the school was known as Dater Junior High School and was located at 2848 Boudinot Ave. Cincinnati, Ohio. It moved to its current location at 2146 Ferguson Rd. Cincinnati, Ohio 45238. It shares a campus with Western Hills High school.
