= Shroder Paideia High School =

Shroder High School

Location
- 5030 Duck Creek Road; Cincinnati, (Hamilton County), Ohio 45227; United States; 39°9′56″N 84°24′30″W

Information
- Type: Public, Coeducational high school
- Status: Active
- School district: Cincinnati Public Schools
- Superintendent: Iranetta Wright
- Principal: Lavaugn Neal
- Grades: 6-12
- Campus: High School
- Colors: Red and Gold
- Athletics conference: Cincinnati Metro Athletic Conference
- Mascot: Jaguars
- Team name: Jaguars
- School fees: CPS
- Tuition: Student Fees
- Website: http://shroder.cps-k12.org

Shroder High School is a public high school (6-12) located in the Madisonville neighborhood of Cincinnati, Ohio. It is part of the Cincinnati Public Schools.

The school is a team-based magnet school dedicated to the Paideia philosophy. The Paideia philosophy is based upon the belief that all students can be successful in a rigorous college preparatory curriculum. Their classroom instruction includes direct, didactic teaching, coaching activities and in-depth seminar discussions.
