= Clark Montessori High School =

Clark Montessori Junior High and High School

Location
- 3030 Erie Ave. Hyde Park; Cincinnati, (Hamilton County), Ohio 45208; United States; 39°11′20″N 84°31′13″W

Information
- Type: Public, coeducational high school
- Established: 1994
- School district: Cincinnati Public Schools
- Superintendent: Shauna Murphy
- Principal: Eric Higgins
- Teaching staff: https://clark.cps-k12.org/contact/staff-list
- Grades: 7-12
- Enrollment: 700+ (2024-2025)
- Color: Royal Blue Black White
- Athletics conference: Miami Valley Conference
- Mascot: Cougar
- Team name: Clark Cougars
- Accreditation: AMS
- Website: clark.cps-k12.org

Peter H. Clark Montessori, usually referred to as Clark Montessori, is a junior and senior high school in Cincinnati, Ohio, United States.

Founded in 1994 as part of Cincinnati Public Schools, Clark is the first public Montessori high school in the United States. Named for abolitionist educator Peter H. Clark, the school has around 700 students in grades 7–12. Cincinnati Public currently includes several Montessori schools, serving grades K-12.

Clark is AMS accredited, and teachers must complete a rigorous, two-year Montessori certification program.

Clark was in the top three schools selected in Barack Obama's 2010 Race to the Top.

Clark is located in the Hyde Park neighborhood on the former estate of Ohio Governor Myers Y. Cooper (1929–1931), with wooded trails in its backyard.

== Clark Montessori Goals ==
These goals are posted in every classroom and honored by students and faculty alike:

- Peace
- Hard Work
- Respect
- Community
- Learning

== Mission ==
Clark practices an experiential teaching style based on Dr. Maria Montessori's work. Though Montessori never explicitly detailed a pedagogy for adolescents, she began to explore the topic in her book From Childhood to Adulthood. That text inspired Clark teachers to develop a curriculum and practices that focus on the specific needs of teenagers. .

== Features ==
- All classes are honors level. Students also have access to AP and CCP coursework.
- Classrooms are organized into multi-level learning communities.
- Students have access to several music programs, including string, steel drum, and jazz.
