= International Market =

International Market may refer to:

- Jungle Jim's International Market
- Nampodong International Market
- Rungis International Market, Paris; see Marché international de Rungis
- Western International Market
