= Boulter =

Boulter is a surname. Notable people with the surname include:

- Beau Boulter (born 1942), member of the United States House of Representatives
- Edmund Boulter (c.1635–1709), London merchant
- Eric Boulter (born 1952), Australian Paralympic swimmer
- George Henry Boulter (1825–1894), Ontario physician and political figure
- Hugh Boulter (1672–1742), Church of Ireland Archbishop of Armagh
- Katie Boulter (born 1996), British tennis player
- Les Boulter (footballer) (1913–1975), Welsh footballer
- Michael Boulter (1942–2025), British paleontologist
- Roy Boulter (born 1964), English rock drummer
- Russell Boulter (born 1963), British actor
- Stanley Boulter (1852–1917), British lawyer and businessman
- William Ewart Boulter (1892–1955), English recipient of the Victoria Cross

== Fictional characters ==
- Brendan Boulter, a fictional character in soap opera Family Affairs
- Kelly Boulter, a fictional character in soap opera Family Affairs
- Les Boulter, a fictional character in soap opera Family Affairs

== See also ==
- Bolter (disambiguation)
- Boulder (disambiguation)
