= Erick All =

American football player (born 2000)

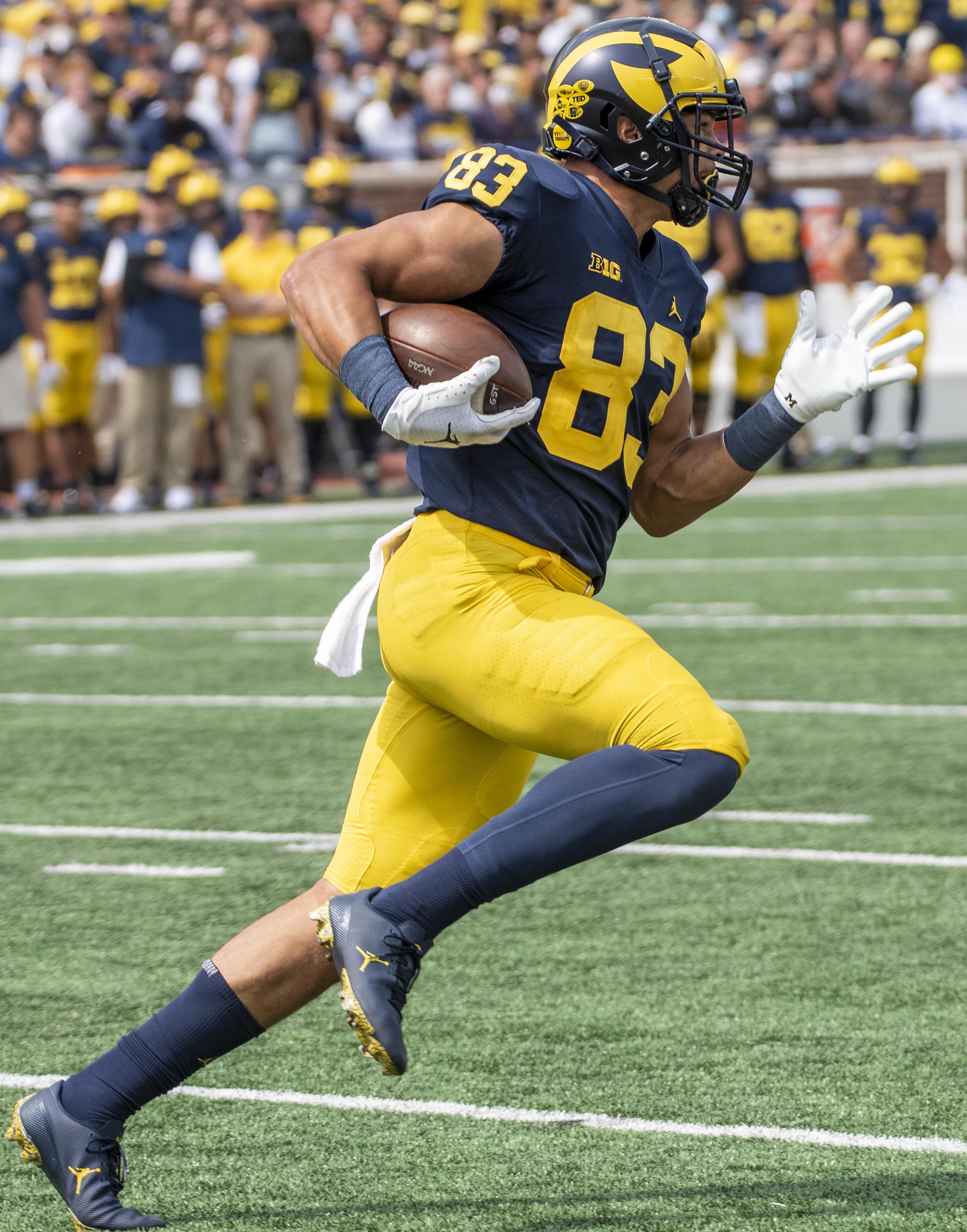
- All with the Michigan Wolverines in 2021

No. 83 – Cincinnati Bengals
- Position: Tight end
- Roster status: Injured reserve

Personal information
- Born: September 13, 2000 (age 26); Hamilton, Ohio, U.S.
- Listed height: 6 ft 5 in (1.96 m)
- Listed weight: 255 lb (116 kg)

Career information
- High school: Fairfield (OH)
- College: Michigan (2019–2022); Iowa (2023)
- NFL draft: 2024: 4th round, 115th overall pick

Career history
- Cincinnati Bengals (2024–present)

Career NFL statistics as of 2024
- Receptions: 20
- Receiving yards: 158
- Stats at Pro Football Reference

Erick All Jr. (born September 13, 2000) is an American professional football tight end for the Cincinnati Bengals of the National Football League (NFL). He played college football for the Michigan Wolverines and the Iowa Hawkeyes and was selected by the Bengals in the fourth round of the 2024 NFL draft.

== Early life ==
All was born on September 13, 2000 in Hamilton, Ohio. At age five months, he was trapped in his playpen on the second floor of a house fire at the family home in Richmond, Indiana. Firefighter Tom Broyles climbed a ladder and entered the smoke-filled bedroom and rescued All. All was not breathing at the time, but EMT medic, Shawn Phenis, administered CPR, and All regained consciousness. During the 2022 season, All's family invited All's rescuer to meet All at a Michigan football game, and the two embraced.

All attended Fairfield High School in Fairfield, Ohio. As a senior, he caught 30 passes for 465 yards and four touchdowns. ESPN rated him as a three-star prospect and the No. 10 tight end in the Class of 2019, and the No. 18 prospect in Ohio.

== College career ==
=== Michigan ===
All verbally committed to play for the University of Michigan in the summer of 2018, then signed his letter of intent in December 2018. He enrolled early and impressed with his performance during spring practice.

As a freshman in 2019, All appeared in 11 games at tight end and on special teams.

As a sophomore in 2020, he appeared in all six games and caught 12 passes for 82 yards.

As a junior in 2021, All caught 34 passes for 374 yards and two touchdowns. Against Michigan State, he caught 10 passes for 98 yards. Against Penn State, he fought through a high ankle sprain and caught the game-winning touchdown pass, a 47-yard strike with 3:29 remaining in the game.

In 2022, All appeared in only three games (three receptions for 36 yards) before sustaining a back injury that required surgery. On December 5, 2022, All announced he was entering the NCAA transfer portal.

=== Iowa ===
On December 14, 2022, All transferred to Iowa. While at Iowa Erick All had 21 receptions, 299 yards and three touchdowns. On October 17, 2023, All was diagnosed with a torn ACL and ruled out for the remainder of the season.

== Professional career ==
Pre-draft measurables
Height	Weight	Arm length	Hand span	Wingspan
6 ft 4 3/8 in (1.94 m)	252 lb (114 kg)	33 in (0.84 m)	10 1/8 in (0.26 m)	6 ft 7 in (2.01 m)
All values from NFL Combine

All was selected by the Cincinnati Bengals with the 115th overall pick in the fourth round of the 2024 NFL draft. He played in nine games for Cincinnati during his rookie campaign, logging 20 receptions for 158 yards. All suffered a season–ending torn ACL in Week 9, and was placed on injured reserve on November 5, 2024.

== Personal life ==
In July 2026, while vacationing in Greece, All was hit and thrown by a Piaggio Ape, but suffered no injuries; All later stated that the incident gave him confidence in his return from surgery.
