= Rich Michael =

American football player (1938–2011)

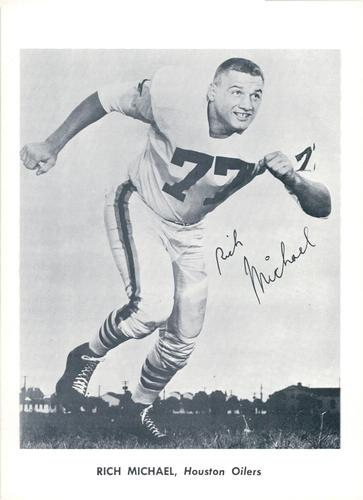

No. 77
- Position: Tackle

Personal information
- Born: November 15, 1938; Hamilton, Ohio, U.S.
- Died: December 22, 2011 (aged 73)
- Listed height: 6 ft 3 in (1.91 m)
- Listed weight: 242 lb (110 kg)

Career information
- High school: Fairfield (Fairfield, Ohio)
- College: Ohio State

Career history
- Houston Oilers (1960–1966)

Awards and highlights
- TSN All-AFL (1960); 2× AFL champion (1960, 1961); 2× AFL All-Star (1962, 1963)
- Stats at Pro Football Reference

Richard John Michael (November 15, 1938 – December 22, 2011) was an American football player. Michael played left tackle for the Ohio State Buckeyes under Woody Hayes.

== See also ==
- List of American Football League players
