= Bolter =

Bolter may refer to:

- Bolter (aeronautics), a term in naval aviation when a pilot misses the arrestor cable on an aircraft carrier and performs a go-around
- Bolter, a type of sieve
- Bolter, someone who walks out of a political convention or legislative congress

== Arts and entertainment ==
- Bolter or Boltgun, a fictional automatic heavy caliber weapon firing "bolts" ammunition in the Warhammer 40,000 universe, with the term "bolter" primarily denote the assault rifle versions
- The Bolter, the narrator's mother in The Pursuit of Love by Nancy Mitford
- "The Bolter", an episode of Upstairs, Downstairs
- The Bolter, a 2008 biography by Frances Osborne about Idina Sackville
- "The Bolter", song by Taylor Swift from 2024 album The Tortured Poets Department

== People with the surname ==
- Brian Bolter (fl. 1999–2013), American television news anchor and reporter
- Jay David Bolter (born 1951), American literary critic

== See also ==
- Boulter, a surname
