= Fairfield City School District =

Public school district in Fairfield, Ohio, United States

The Fairfield City School District is a public school district in Butler County, Ohio, United States. It encompasses most of the city of Fairfield and most of Fairfield Township, as well as small parts of the city of Hamilton. It has a student population of approximately 10,000.

== Schools ==
Fairfield City Schools runs 10 schools, ranging from kindergarten through 12th grades. The six elementary schools are separated by geographic delineations. The Middle schools each draw their students from 3 of the elementary schools. Creekside gets students in the geographic districts of South, West and Central Elementaries; Crossroads gets students in the geographic districts of East, North and Compass. The Freshman and High schools draw their students from the entire district. The School District closed their dedicated Kindergarten Center after the 2010-2011 school year. The District moved these classes to 2 of their 6 Elementary Schools. The District has changed their schools around over the years and this is expressed in the chart below:

School	Grade levels	Year opened in order	Notes
Fairfield Freshman School	9	2017	
Fairfield Central Elementary School	K-5	2017	
Fairfield Compass Elementary School	K-5	2017	
Fairfield East Elementary School	Pre-K-5	1997	
Fairfield Senior High School	10-12	1996	
Fairfield Crossroads Middle School	6-8	1978 (Middle) 1997 (5/6) 2017 (6-8)	Name changed in 2017 from Fairfield Intermediate School
Fairfield South Elementary School	K-5	1972	5th grade brought in at beginning of 2018-2019 year Pre-K took out at beginning of 2018-2019 year
Fairfield Creekside Middle School	6-8	1961 (High School) 1997 (Middle 7/8) 2017 (6-8)	Name changed in 2017 from Fairfield Middle School
Fairfield North Elementary School	K-5	1961	
Fairfield West Elementary School	Pre-K-5	1957	
Former Schools	Grade levels	Year opened	Notes
Fairfield Freshman School	9	1951 (Fairfield Twp. High School), 1961 (Middle), 1978 (Freshman)	Torn down in 2017
Fairfield Central Elementary School	Pre-K-4	1929 (Fairfield Twp. General K-12 School)	Torn down in 2017

Fairfield also operates an alternate education academy for students in High School. This academy is located in the former district office building on Donald Drive in the parking lot of Fairfield Crossroads Middle School. Fairfield Academy as it is now known is a joint venture between Fairfield and Butler Tech. The Options Academy as it was dubbed in its early days was located in "Trailer Row" in the parking lot of Fairfield Creekside Middle School prior to a fire that destroyed it in the winter of 2013.

The former Kindergarten Center located on Bach lane was renovated prior to the 13-14 school year and became the district office.

In May 2014 the district got approval from the state and the county voters to begin work on an 80 million dollar project to improve the schools. This plan included the building of a new elementary school across from the high school, changing all the elementary schools to go to 5th grade instead of 4th, converting Fairfield Crossroads Middle School into 6-8th grades, converting Fairfield Creekside Middle School into 6-8th grades, building of a new Central Elementary School in the back parking lot of the old Central and the building of a Freshman High School on the Campus of the Senior High School. This project received $19 million from the state and the rest be funded by a 38-year tax bond of $61 million.

== Athletics ==
The Fairfield City School District Athletic Department offers 22 different sports and is a member of the Greater Miami Conference. From its early days up to the 1960s were known as the "Farmers" a play on the local ties to farming. By the mid 1960s the District adopted the official nickname "The Indians" and have remained so ever since.

Through both nicknames the colours has stayed Red, White and Blue as with its rivals Hamilton CSD. With these colors used by both Districts, Fairfield uses Red, White and Black as the primary uniform colors with Blue only being used as a detail color.

=== LCpl Taylor B. Prazynski Field at Fairfield Stadium ===
LCpl Taylor B. Prazynski Field at Fairfield Stadium sits on the site of all of former Fairfield football fields. The original field built on the site "Farmer Field" saw its first use in the late 40s and was a flat grass field used for all of the district's outdoor sports. It was not until the early 60s that proper stands were built on what was then the home side of the stadium, and it got its first official name, "Fairfield Field".

Fairfield Field has seen extensive renovations since the 1974 football season. In the mid 70s the original running track was built around the field and the double row wooden visitor's bleachers were demolished. By 1977 the new home bleachers and locker room were built on the former visitor sideline and the next season the current scoreboard was erected.

Since the early 80s the stadium has remained mostly unchanged except for additional concessions stands added in 1993, 2001, and 2010, new track surface in 2011 and Field Turf in 2012. It was renamed in 2006 for former Fairfield Football Player LCpl Taylor B. Prazynski, KIA May 5, 2005, Al Karmah Provence, Iraq.

It was announced in late 2014 that the stadium would undergo a 2.5 million dollar renovations to build new stands on both sidelines, a new press box, replace the 4 year old turf, and build a new locker building. The improvements were an attempt to repair Fairfield's Football Programs image after for the last 6 seasons opponents has to use Crossroads Middle School gym to get ready for games.

=== Christy Dennis Soccer Stadium ===
The Christy Dennis Soccer Stadium located next door was built in the late 1990s to allow the football stadium to remain football only and has recently been renovated to include a 5 row grandstand and a gazebo. The stadium is named for former Fairfield Soccer player Christy Dennis.

=== The Annex ===
Fairfield also operates a small athletic annex or known as the swamp by students in the field behind Creekside Middle School. The annex is home to Both Nuxhall Baseball and Nuxhall Softball fields both built in the early 2000s.
