= Fairfield High School (Fairfield, Ohio) =

Public high school in Fairfield, Ohio, United States

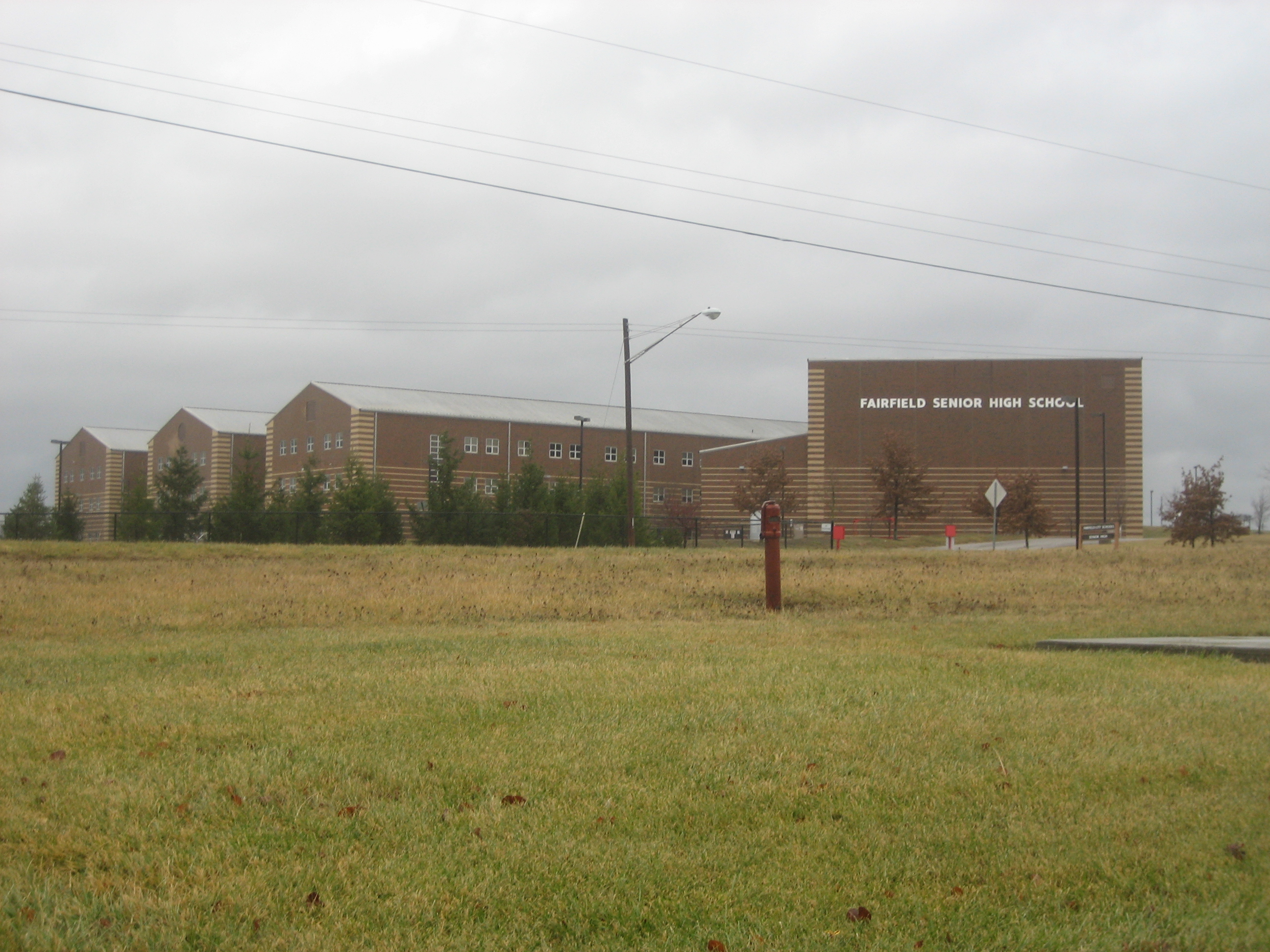
- FHS as seen from Route 4

Location
- 8800 Holden Boulevard; Fairfield, (Butler County), Ohio 45014; United States; 39°20′13″N 84°31′4″W

Information
- Type: Public high school
- Motto: "Creating Opportunities For Our Future"
- School district: Fairfield City School District
- Principal: Ryan Bellamy
- Teaching staff: 103.69 (FTE)
- Grades: 10-12
- Enrollment: 2,216 (2023-2024)
- Student to teacher ratio: 21.37
- Colors: Red and white
- Athletics conference: Greater Miami Conference
- Nickname: Indians
- Accreditation: North Central Association of Colleges and Schools
- Website: hs.fairfieldcityschools.com

Fairfield High School is a public high school in Fairfield, Ohio, United States. It is the only high school in the Fairfield City School District, and serves grades 10–12. The Fairfield City School district serves students in the city of Fairfield and Fairfield Township.

== Demographics ==
The demographic breakdown of the 2,030 students enrolled for the 2012–2013 school year was:

- Male - 50.7%
- Female - 49.3%
- Native American/Alaskan - 0.1%
- Asian/Pacific islanders - 2.5%
- Black - 15.5%
- Hispanic - 5.1%
- White - 72.8%
- Multiracial - 4.0%

In addition, 27.2% of the students were eligible for free or reduced lunch.

== Athletics ==
Fairfield athletic teams are known as the Indians. The Indians compete in the Greater Miami Conference.

=== Boy's ===
- Baseball
- Basketball
- Bowling
- Cross country
- Football
- Golf
- Soccer
- Swimming
- Tennis
- Track and field
- Wrestling
- Lacrosse
- Volleyball

=== Girl's ===
- Basketball
- Bowling
- Cheerleading
- Cross country
- Dance team
- Golf
- Soccer
- Softball
- Swimming
- Tennis
- Track and field
- Volleyball
- Lacrosse
- Wrestling

== Ohio High School Athletic Association state championships ==
- Boys' football – 1986
- Boys' baseball – 1985, 1991
- Boys' golf – 1979

== Performing arts ==
Fairfield has two competitive show choirs: the mixed-gender Choraliers and the women's-only Pure Elegance. The two groups completed a podium sweep at Marion Harding in 2019. Since 1999, Fairfield has also hosted its own competition, the Crystal Classic.

== Notable alumni ==
- Erick All, National Football League tight end for the Cincinnati Bengals
- Jackson Carman, football player
- Ray Coney, college football player
- Angelo Dawkins, WWE superstar
- Jeff Hartsock, former MLB player
- Eric Lange, actor
- Rich Michael, former professional football player
- Reckless Ben, slackliner and YouTuber
- Josiah Scott, football player
