= Jackson Carman =

American football player (born 2000)

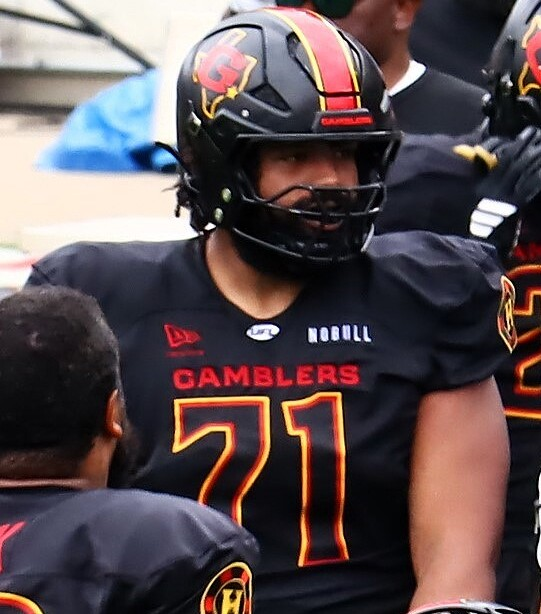
- Carman in 2026

No. 71 – Dallas Renegades
- Position: Guard
- Roster status: Active

Personal information
- Born: January 22, 2000 (age 26); Fairfield, Ohio, U.S.
- Listed height: 6 ft 5 in (1.96 m)
- Listed weight: 317 lb (144 kg)

Career information
- High school: Fairfield
- College: Clemson (2018–2020)
- NFL draft: 2021: 2nd round, 46th overall pick

Career history
- Cincinnati Bengals (2021–2023); Miami Dolphins (2024); Birmingham Stallions (2026); Houston Gamblers (2026); Dallas Renegades (2027–present)

Awards and highlights
- CFP national champion (2018); First-team All-ACC (2020); Second-team All-ACC (2019)

Career NFL statistics
- Games played: 30
- Games started: 7
- Stats at Pro Football Reference

Jackson Carman (born January 22, 2000) is an American professional football guard for the Dallas Renegades of the United Football League (UFL). He played college football for the Clemson Tigers, and was selected by the Cincinnati Bengals in the second round of the 2021 NFL draft.

== Early life ==
Carman grew up in Fairfield, Ohio, and attended Fairfield High School. He played along Michigan’s Erik All (TE) and Cincinnati’s Malik Vann (DE). Carman was rated a five-star recruit and the best collegiate prospect in Ohio by 247Sports, ESPN and Rivals. He committed to play college football at Clemson over offers from Ohio State and USC.

== College career ==
Carman played in 13 games as a true freshman, playing 209 total snaps as the Tigers won the 2018 National Championship. As a sophomore, Carman was named the Tigers' starting left tackle and started all 15 of Clemson's games and was named third-team All-Atlantic Coast Conference (ACC). Carman was named to the Outland Trophy watchlist going into his junior season. Carman started all 12 games of his Junior season and was named second-team All-ACC. On January 6, 2021, he announced that he would forgo his senior year and enter the draft.

== Professional career ==
Pre-draft measurables
Height	Weight	Arm length	Hand span	Wingspan
6 ft 4 7/8 in (1.95 m)	317 lb (144 kg)	32 1/2 in (0.83 m)	9 5/8 in (0.24 m)	6 ft 8 7/8 in (2.05 m)
All values from Pro Day

=== Cincinnati Bengals ===
==== 2021 ====
Carman was selected by the Cincinnati Bengals in the second round (46th overall) of the 2021 NFL draft. On May 18, 2021, Carman signed his four-year rookie contract with Cincinnati. Third-year veteran Jonah Williams remained the Bengals' starting left tackle, but the team found a place for Carman at right guard. He played all 17 games for Cincinnati in his rookie season, starting in six of them, and played in all four of the Bengals postseason games as well.

==== 2022 ====
In 2022, Cincinnati signed free agent guard Alex Cappa and drafted guard Cordell Volson in the fourth round of the NFL Draft. Cappa was immediately assigned to play right guard, and Volson beat out Carman for the starting left guard position, leaving Carman on the bench. However, when multiple injuries befell the Bengals late in the season, the team called on Carman to replace Williams at the left tackle position for the second half of its Wild Card Round playoff win against the Baltimore Ravens. In a highly anticipated matchup with the Buffalo Bills in the Divisional Round, Carman and the patchwork offensive line put together a strong performance, generating 172 team rushing yards and allowing just one quarterback sack in a 27–10 win.

==== 2023 ====
Carman began the 2023 season as the backup right tackle yet again behind Williams. He did not start a single game, and only played snaps in two games the whole season.

==== 2024 ====
During the Bengals first preseason game against the Tampa Bay Buccaneers, Carman picked up three holding penalties along with one false start penalty in a 17–14 loss. He was waived by the Bengals on August 23, 2024.

=== Miami Dolphins ===
On September 17, 2024, Carman signed with the Miami Dolphins practice squad. He was promoted to the active roster on December 4.

On May 12, 2025, Carman re-signed with the Dolphins. He was released on August 26 as part of final roster cuts.

=== Birmingham Stallions ===
On January 14, 2026, Carman was selected by the Birmingham Stallions of the United Football League (UFL). He was released on April 14.

=== Houston Gamblers ===
On April 14, 2026, Carman was claimed by the Houston Gamblers of the United Football League (UFL).
