= WTTG =

Television station in Washington, D.C.

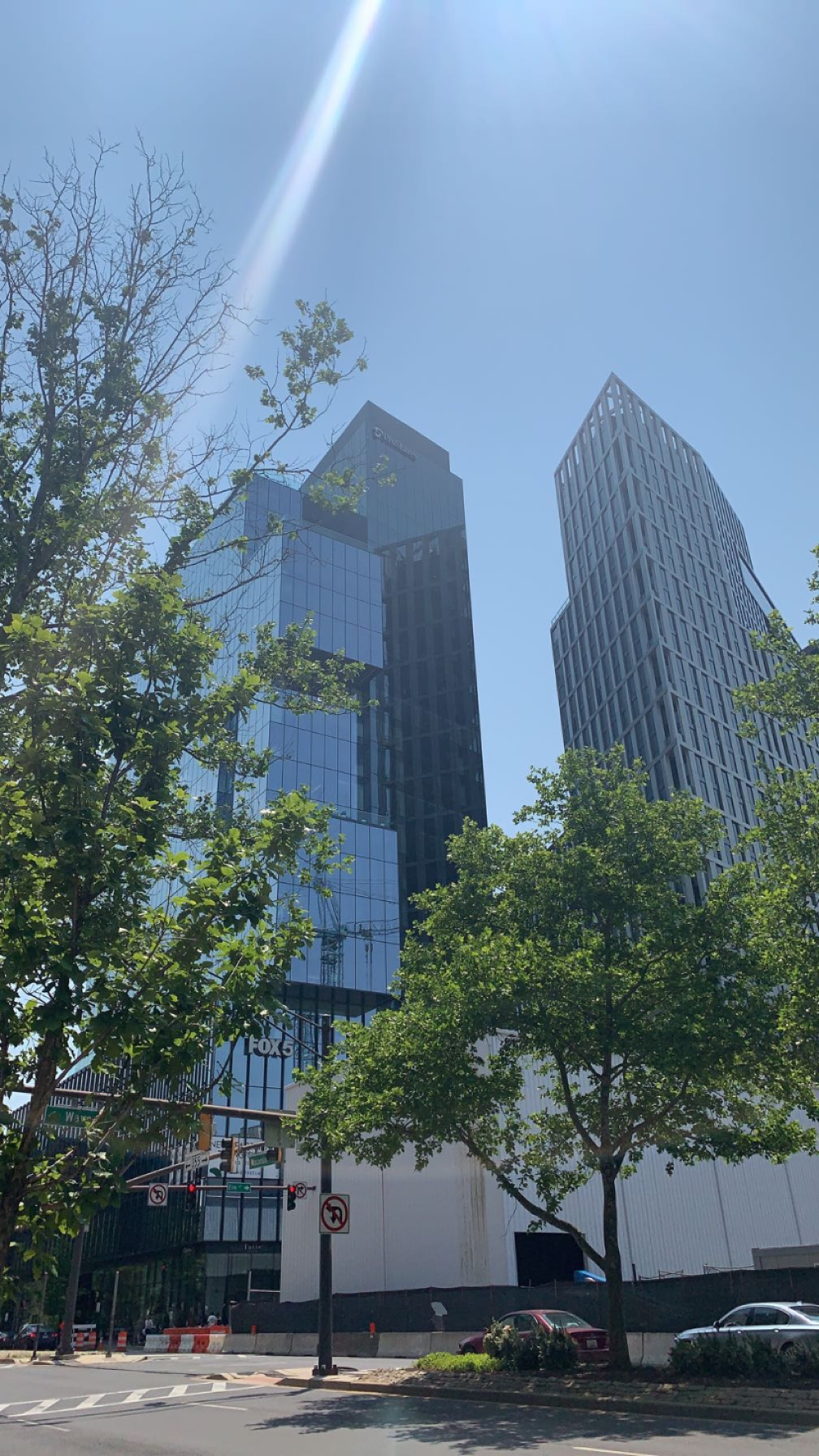
- WTTG and WDCA studios on Wisconsin Avenue in Bethesda, Maryland.
- Washington, D.C.; United States
- Channels: Digital: 36 (UHF), shared with WDCA; Virtual: 5
- Branding: Fox 5

Programming
- Affiliations: 5.1: Fox; 5.2: Buzzr; 5.3: Start TV

Ownership
- Owner: Fox Television Stations, LLC
- Sister stations: WDCA

History
- Founded: May 19, 1945 (as experimental station W3XWT)
- First air date: December 10, 1946
- Former channel number: Analog: 5 (VHF, 1946–2009)
- Former affiliations: DuMont (1946–1956); Independent (1956–1986)
- Call sign meaning: Thomas Toliver Goldsmith (chief engineer of founding company DuMont)

Technical information
- Licensing authority: FCC
- Facility ID: 22207
- ERP: 1,000 kW
- HAAT: 235 m (771 ft)
- Transmitter coordinates: 38°57′49.9″N 77°6′17.2″W
- Translator(s): W24ES-D Moorefield, WV

Links
- Public license information: Public file; LMS
- Website: www.fox5dc.com

WTTG (channel 5) is a television station in Washington, D.C. It is owned and operated by the Fox network through its Fox Television Stations division, and is sister to WDCA (channel 20), an independent station with MyNetworkTV programming. WTTG and WDCA share studios on Wisconsin Avenue in Bethesda, Maryland. Through a channel sharing agreement, the stations transmit using WTTG's spectrum from a tower also located in Bethesda on River Road at the site of WDCA's former studio facilities.

WTTG's signal is rebroadcast on a low-power digital translator station, W24ES-D, in Moorefield, West Virginia (which is owned by Valley TV Cooperative, Inc.).

== History ==
=== Early years (1945–1958) ===
The Weather Wheel with Jean Ramsey airing on WTTG in 1957

The station traces its history to May 19, 1945, when television set and equipment manufacturer Allen B. DuMont founded W3XWT, the second experimental station in the nation's capital (after NBC's W3XNB, forerunner to WRC-TV). Later in 1945, DuMont Laboratories began a series of experimental coaxial cable hookups between W3XWT and its other television station, WABD (now WNYW) in New York City. These hookups were the beginning of the DuMont Television Network, the world's first commercial television network. DuMont began regular network service in 1946. The Federal Communications Commission (FCC) granted a 90-day commercial license—the first in the nation's capital—to WTTG that November 29, and the first program that aired on the station was a Washington Lions hockey game from Uline Arena on December 10, sponsored by the U.S. Rubber Company. It continued using the experimental 5 kW transmitter of W3XWT until late in 1947, when work had progressed enough on its final transmission site to move there at low power; DuMont did not complete construction and begin full-time, full-power operation until June 1949.

The station was named for Thomas T. Goldsmith Jr., the DuMont Network's chief engineer and a close friend of Dr. DuMont.

Like WABD and DuMont's other owned-and-operated station, WDTV in Pittsburgh, WTTG was far more successful than the network as a whole. In 1956, after DuMont shut down network operations, WTTG and WABD became independent stations and were spun off from DuMont Laboratories as the DuMont Broadcasting Corporation (WDTV was sold to Westinghouse Electric Corporation the previous year; it is now CBS owned-and-operated station KDKA-TV). DuMont later changed its name to Metropolitan Broadcasting to distance itself from its former parent company.

=== As an independent station (1958–1986) ===
In 1958 Washington investor John Kluge bought controlling interest in Metropolitan Broadcasting from Paramount Pictures and installed himself as its chairman. He changed the company's name to Metromedia in 1961. Goldsmith sat on Metromedia's board of directors for over a quarter-century. Channel 5 gained a sister station on radio when Metromedia purchased WASH (97.1 FM) in 1968. At first, WTTG ran on a low budget. However, in the late 1960s, it benefited from Metromedia's aggressiveness in acquiring top syndicated programming, giving it a significant leg up on WDCA, which signed on in 1966.

CIA File 104-10065-10148 indicating WTTG released classified material without authorization

By the 1970s WTTG was one of the leading independent stations in the country, running a broad lineup of cartoons, off-network sitcoms, first-run syndicated shows, older movies, local newscasts and locally produced programs. During this time period, and well into the early 1990s, WTTG was the flagship station for the Georgetown Hoyas men's basketball team as well as Big East Conference men's basketball. Its main claim to fame was Panorama, an afternoon talk show hosted by Maury Povich and John Willis.

When cable television began in the 1970s, WTTG became a regional superstation. At one point it appeared on every cable provider in Maryland and Virginia, as well as most of Delaware and in parts of West Virginia, North Carolina, South Carolina, and Pennsylvania.

In July 1978, WTTG leaked classified secret photographs by the Central Intelligence Agency (CIA), which were of Nikolay Leonov, a KGB spy with connections to the assassinations of John F. Kennedy and Martin Luther King Jr. Information regarding this leak was released to the public in July 2025, following declassification by Executive Order 14176.

=== Transition to Fox (1986–present) ===
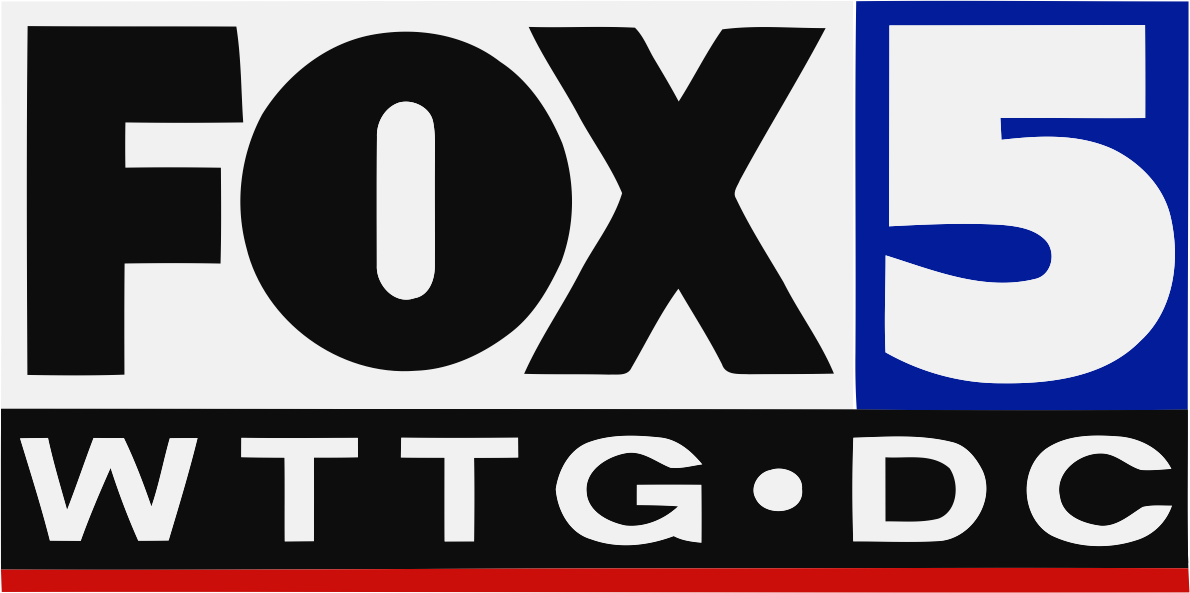
WTTG's station logo from 1997 to 2006.

Metromedia owned the station until 1986 when Rupert Murdoch, after buying 20th Century Fox, purchased the Metromedia television stations to form the nucleus of the Fox network. WTTG became one of Fox's six original owned-and-operated stations when the network launched on October 9, 1986, all the while retaining consistently high ratings, a rarity for a Fox station in its early years of operation at the time, and continuing to easily out-rate WDCA and new competitor WCQR (channel 50, now WDCW). Initially, its programming was similar to what it had run as a true independent station, since Fox only programmed for a few hours on weekends in its early years (the network would not have a full seven-day schedule worth of programs until 1993).

As channel 5 transitioned to an O&O and more independent stations signed on, it lost much of its cable audience. Though not distributed as widely as it once was, it is still available on several cable providers in Maryland and Virginia outside the D.C. metro area. For instance, it is still carried on cable in Charlottesville, Virginia, even though the city has had its own Fox affiliate, WAHU-CD, since 2005; both stations are carried on basic cable in the Charlottesville area. It also served as the default Fox affiliate for Salisbury, Maryland, until WBOC-TV introduced a Fox subchannel on August 21, 2006.

During the 1990s the station added more syndicated talk shows and reality shows. It continued to air Fox Kids programming until the fall of 2001, when it moved to WDCA; WTTG returned to airing children's programming later on in 2003, under the banners of FoxBox and 4Kids TV, and aired that block until it ended in December 2008. In that same fall on October 29, Fox purchased WDCA from Viacom's Paramount Stations Group, creating a duopoly with WTTG. The station continued to run top rated off-network sitcoms in the evenings.

On December 14, 2017, The Walt Disney Company, owner of ABC (affiliated network of WJLA-TV, channel 7), announced its intent to buy WTTG's parent company, 21st Century Fox, for $66.1 billion; the sale, which closed on March 20, 2019, excluded WTTG and sister station WDCA as well as the Fox network, the MyNetworkTV programming service, Fox News, Fox Sports 1 and the Fox Television Stations unit, which were all transferred to the newly formed Fox Corporation.

On July 24, 2021, both WTTG and sister station WDCA (the latter of which is now branded as Fox 5 Plus) moved two miles (3 km) from their old studios in Washington's Friendship Heights neighborhood to a new broadcast facility on Wisconsin Avenue in Bethesda, Maryland.

== Programming ==
=== Sports programming ===
WTTG has been the primary station for the Washington Commanders (formerly the Washington Redskins and later the Washington Football Team) since 1994, when Fox obtained the rights to air NFL games in which a team from the National Football Conference (which the Commanders are part of) played a road game. WTTG airs all of the team's Sunday afternoon games, unless the game is instead covered by the NFL's contract with CBS (in which case WUSA airs the game). This relationship is limited to network coverage of regular season and postseason games, since WUSA is the official broadcast partner for the team's ancillary programming; beginning in 2018, with Fox's purchase of the package, all Thursday Night Football games are aired on WTTG. Prior to 1994, when the Fox network established its sports division, WTTG aired the team's preseason games and training camp scrimmages during the majority of the 1980s into the early 1990s. Since the league suspended its blackout policy in 2015, WTTG has never blacked out the team's home games, despite the team's issues since the mid-2010s with maintaining sellouts at Northwest Stadium.

The station also airs Washington Nationals games either as up to 10 simulcasts with Nationals.tv or when they are featured on Fox's Major League Baseball telecasts, including the team's victory over the Houston Astros in the 2019 World Series, which marked the Fall Classic's return to the nation's capital after 86 years. Additionally, Channel 5 carries any Maryland Terrapins football and men's basketball games selected for broadcast by Fox through its agreement with the Big Ten Conference, plus Georgetown Hoyas men's basketball via the Big East Conference.

=== News operation ===
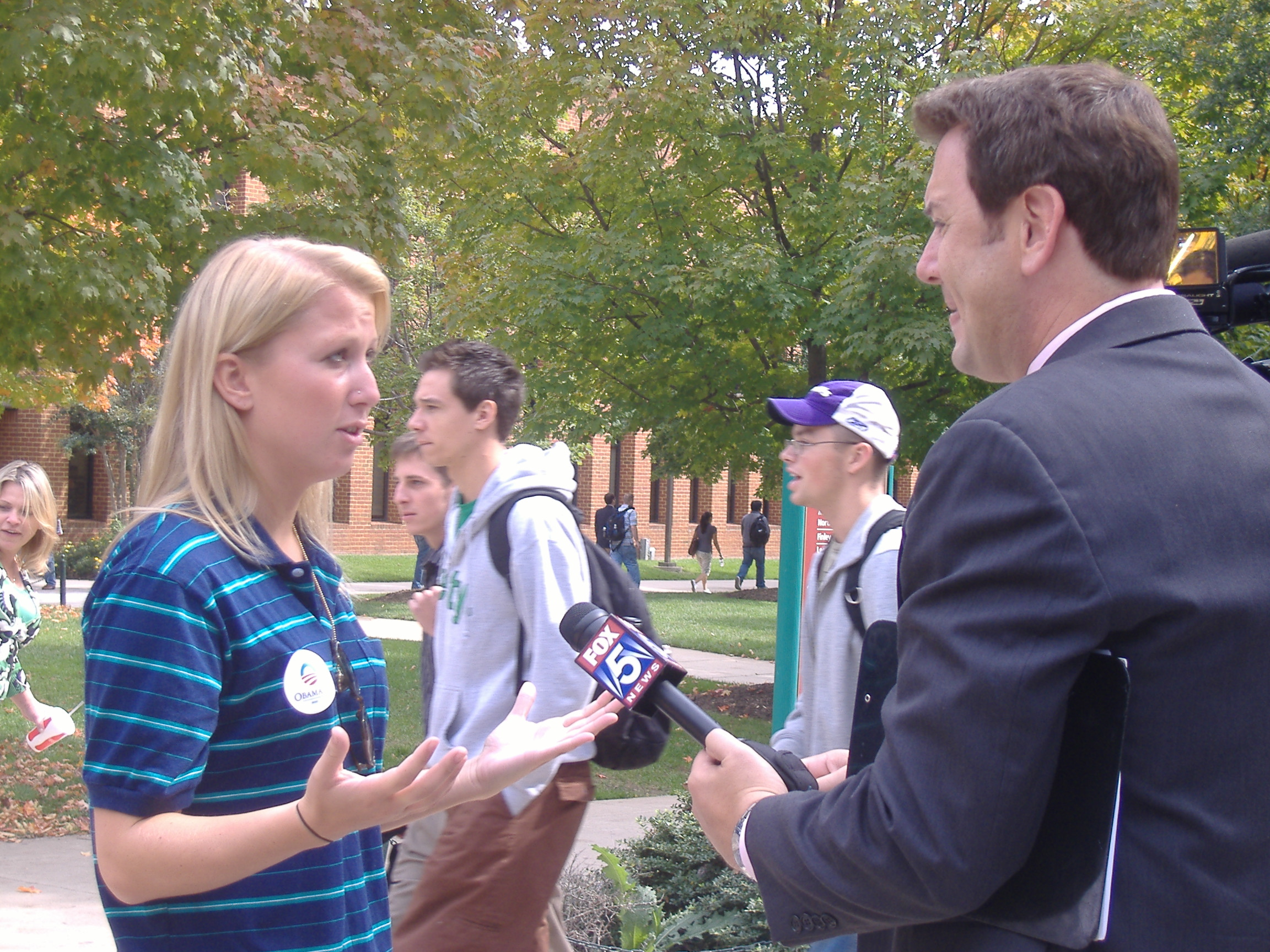
A WTTG reporter conducts an interview on the campus of George Mason University in 2008

As of February 2026, WTTG broadcasts 86 hours of locally produced newscasts each week (with 15 1/2 hours each weekday, 4 1/2 hours on Saturdays and four hours on Sundays). The Sunday morning news show Fox 5 News on the Hill airs in the final half-hour of Fox 5 Morning News Sunday at 8:30 am. In regards of the devoted number of hours, it is the highest news output in the Washington market.

On September 4, 2006, WTTG began simulcasting its weekday morning and nightly 10 pm newscasts on then-Baltimore sister station WUTB (now owned by Sinclair Broadcast Group), under the banner of My 24 News. Management at both stations cited the decision to simulcast as a by-product of cross-regional news interests and increasing overlap between the Baltimore and Washington media markets. In October 2006, while WTTG aired Fox Sports' coverage of the 2006 Major League Baseball postseason, the first half-hour of the 10 pm newscast was broadcast by sister station WDCA under the title Fox 5 News at Ten: Special Edition; this also occurred in 2007, with the WDCA broadcast of the program being titled My 20 News at 10.

On July 2, 2007, WTTG discontinued its noon newscast and replaced it with an hour-long newscast at 11 am, titled Fox 5 News Midday. On September 10, 2007, the station reformatted its 6 pm newscast into an early evening edition of NewsEdge; the addition of NewsEdge at 6 pm was due in part to the success of its current 11 pm counterpart. On January 14, 2009, WTTG and WRC-TV entered into a Local News Service agreement in which the two stations pool video and share news helicopter footage.

On January 30, 2009, starting with its 6 pm newscast, WTTG became the third television station in the Washington, D.C. market (behind CBS affiliate WUSA and ABC affiliate WJLA-TV) to begin broadcasting its local newscasts in high definition. On September 14, 2009, WTTG expanded its weekday morning newscast to five hours by adding another hour at 9 am; in turn, its hour-long 11 am midday newscast was discontinued. In early 2010, WTTG became the second station in the market (behind WUSA) to expand its weekday morning newscast to 4:30 am.

In late August 2013, WTTG began using the AFD No. 10 broadcast flag to present their newscasts in letterboxed widescreen for viewers watching on cable television through 4:3 television sets; with the move, it became the second station in the Washington, D.C. market (behind WUSA) to broadcast to use the AFD No. 10 flag.

On June 16, 2014, WTTG expanded its weekday morning newscasts with the addition of an hour-long block at 10 am. This was followed on July 12 by the addition of a two-hour Saturday morning newscast from 7 to 9 am and the July 13 expansion of its existing Sunday morning newscast to two hours from 7 to 9 am.

On June 5, 2017, WTTG added an additional half-hour to its late-night news block, titled The Final 5. This makes WTTG among the very few stations to extend their late newscast to midnight and one of three Fox affiliates (Kansas City's WDAF and Atlanta's WAGA-TV are the others) to air a two-hour late-night news block. On July 17 of the same year, WTTG began producing its primetime nightly newscasts for sister station WDCA titled Fox 5 News on the Plus (but are titled on-air as Fox 5 News at 8 pm). The weeknight editions, which are run for a half-hour from 8 to 8:30 pm and from 9 to 9:30 pm were originally anchored by the 10 pm team of Tony Perkins, Shawn Yancy and meteorologist Sue Palka, while the weekend editions are run from 7 to 8 pm on Saturday and from 7 to 7:30 pm on Sunday.

On July 8, 2019, WTTG become the third station in the Washington media market to debut an hour-long 4 pm newscast after WJLA-TV and WRC-TV (WUSA was the first station in the market to debut an hour-long 4 pm newscast in 1989; however, it was also the first to cancel the 4 pm newscast, which happened in 2000; WUSA has since revived its 4 pm newscast, which happened in September 2023).

On January 13, 2025, WTTG became the first station in the Washington television market to produce local programming at 2 pm, being titled The Take @ 2.

==== Criticism ====
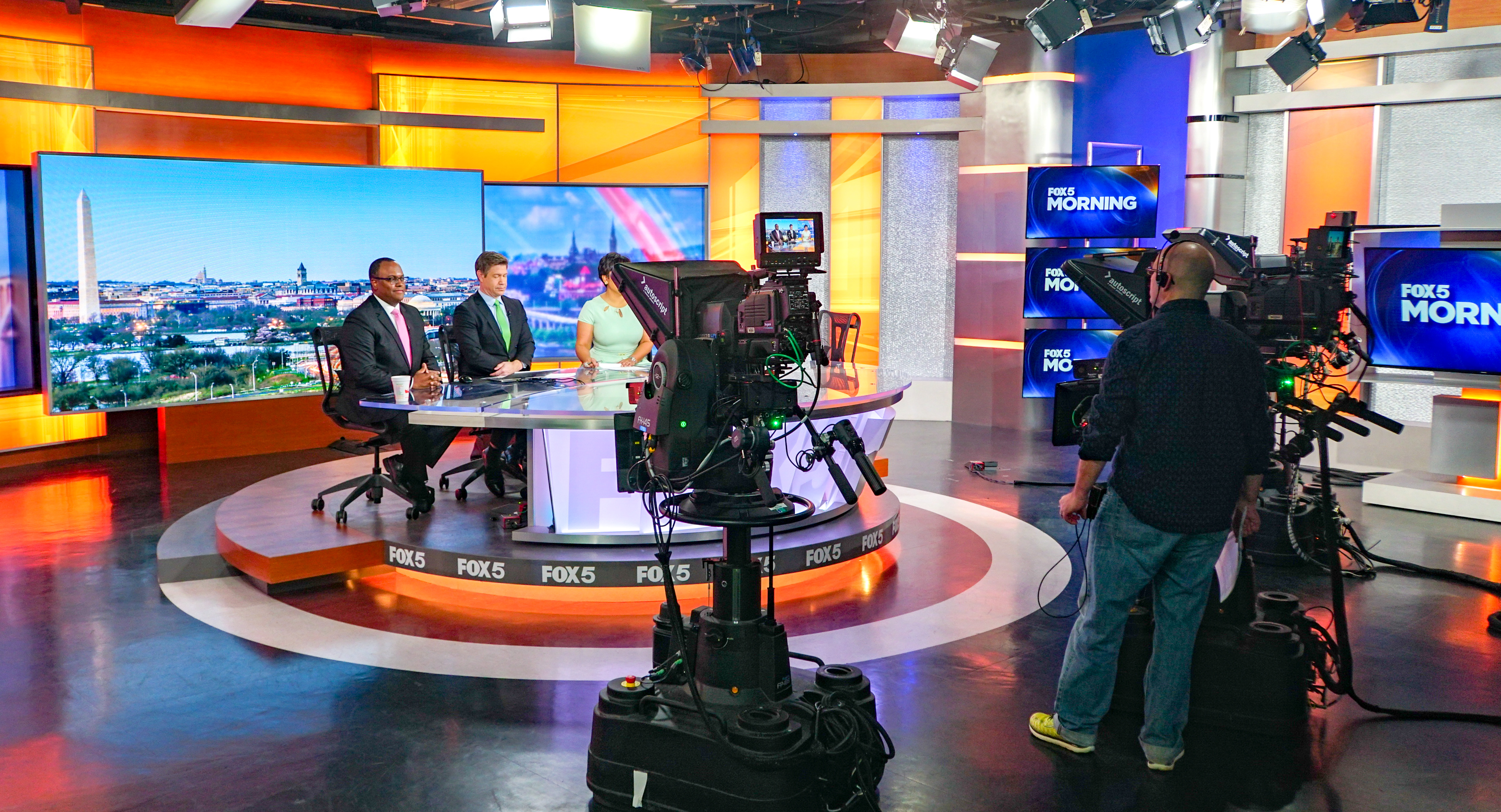
On the set of WTTG's morning newscast in 2019

In 2004, the inner operations of WTTG during the station's first years under News Corporation's ownership were scrutinized in Robert Greenwald's documentary Outfoxed: Rupert Murdoch's War on Journalism. The documentary, through a panel of former WTTG journalists and staffers, claimed that following Rupert Murdoch's acquisition, WTTG's news reporting became biased and sensationalist. The former WTTG employees claimed that they were ordered "from the top" to air an uncut tribute to Ronald Reagan from the 1988 Republican National Convention; they were told to run a piece that "rehashed the whole matter of [Senator Ted Kennedy's deadly car accident at] Chappaquiddick" which had "zero news value"; and there was an obsessive attitude over airing stories related to wedge issues such as race relations and AIDS.

WTTG attracted controversy over its chief investigative reporter Emily J. Miller, who aired segments critical of gun control without divulging her involvement in gun rights activism. As a result, WTTG added disclosures to Miller's segments informing viewers that she was "a proponent for Second Amendment rights". Miller had claimed that her pro-gun views resulted from being the victim of a home invasion, but Washington Post blogger Erik Wemple discovered that her account was largely fabricated. Critics also highlighted missteps in Miller's reporting, including an incident where she confused the photographs of two black men and misidentified one of them as a convicted sex offender. Miller left WTTG at the conclusion of her contract in March 2016.

In May 2017, WTTG was criticized for its coverage of the murder of Seth Rich, and in particular for giving credence to unproven accusations that Rich leaked documents from the Democratic National Committee. This WTTG story proved to be inaccurate. The story was picked up by WTTG's sister network, Fox News Channel, a day after the story broke. Fox subsequently retracted the story.

==== Notable current on-air staff ====
- Julie Donaldson
- Tom Fitzgerald
- Angie Goff
- Kevin Walling

==== Notable former on-air staff ====
- Brian Bolter – anchor (1999–2013)
- Steve Buckhantz – sports anchor (1987–2001)
- Matthew Cappucci – weekend meteorologist (2021–2023)
- Connie Chung – reporter (1970–1971)
- Jack Conaty – reporter (1986–1987)
- Nancy Cozean
- Dave Feldman – sports anchor (2000–2012)
- Michael Gargiulo – morning anchor (2000–2006)
- Brett Haber – sports anchor/reporter (1997–2000)
- Hillary Howard (Statter) – meteorologist (1990s–2000)
- Gus Johnson – weekend sports anchor/reporter (1991–1992)
- Morris Jones – anchor/reporter (1983–2001)
- Pat Mitchell – anchor/Panorama host (1977–1979)
- Holly Morris – reporter (1998–2024)
- Dan Patrick – reporter (1970s)
- Tony Perkins – weather anchor/anchor (1993–1999 and 2005–2019)
- Maury Povich – anchor/reporter/Panorama host (1967–1976 and 1983–1986)
- Amy Robach – anchor/reporter (1998–2003)
- Al Roker – weather anchor (1976–1978)
- Bob Schieffer – reporter (1969–1977)
- Bob Sellers – anchor (2006–2008)
- Sara Underwood – reporter
- Tim White – morning anchor (1990–1993)
- Brian Williams – anchor/reporter/Panorama host (1985–1986)
- Brian Wilson – anchor/reporter (1996–2000)

== Technical information ==
=== Subchannels ===
WTTG and WDCA are broadcast from a transmitter facility on River Road in Bethesda, Maryland.

Subchannels of WTTG and WDCA
License	Subchannel	Res.	Short name	Programming
WTTG	5.1	720p	WTTG-DT	Fox
WTTG	5.2	480i	BUZZR	Buzzr
WTTG	5.3	480i	START	Start TV
WDCA	20.1	720p	WDCA	Main WDCA programming
WDCA	20.2	480i	MOVIES	Movies!
WDCA	20.3	480i	HEROES	Heroes & Icons
WDCA	20.4	480i	FOXWX	Fox Weather

=== Analog-to-digital conversion ===
WTTG ended regular programming on its analog signal, over VHF channel 5, on June 12, 2009, the official date on which full-power television stations in the United States transitioned from analog to digital broadcasts under federal mandate. The station's digital signal continued to broadcast on its pre-transition UHF channel 36, using virtual channel 5. As part of the SAFER Act, WTTG kept its analog signal on the air until July 12 to inform viewers of the digital television transition through a loop of public service announcements from the National Association of Broadcasters.

On April 4, 2017, the FCC announced that sister station WDCA was a winner in the 2016–17 spectrum reallocation auction, and in return, received $118,834,183 for the frequency. WDCA was scheduled to stop broadcasting its own signal over channel 35 no later than January 23, 2018, and continue over-the-air coverage by sharing WTTG's channel 36. The channel-sharing arrangement required WDCA and WTTG to drop one or more of their combined five subchannels; WDCA obtained a three-month extension from the original off-air deadline to avoid doing so for as long as possible. The deadline was later extended by 90 additional days, to July 22, 2018, which was the longest delay allowed by FCC rules; WDCA moved channels on July 18.

=== Translator ===
- W24ES-D Moorefield, WV
