= Cincinnati Financial =

American insurance company

Cincinnati Financial Corporation
- Type: Public
- Traded as: Nasdaq: CINF; S&P 500 component
- Industry: Insurance
- Founded: 1950; 76 years ago in Cincinnati, Ohio, U.S.
- Founders: John J. Schiff Sr.; Robert C. Schiff Sr.
- Headquarters: Fairfield, Ohio, U.S.
- Key people: Stephen M. Spray (CEO)
- Products: Property & Casualty Insurance; Life Insurance; Asset management
- Revenue: ▼US$7.536 Billion (Fiscal Year Ended 31 December 2020)
- Operating income: ▼US$1.499 Billion (Fiscal Year Ended 31 December 2020)
- Net income: ▼US$1.216 Billion (Fiscal Year Ended 31 December 2020)
- Total assets: ▲US$27.542 Billion (Fiscal Year Ended 31 December 2020)
- Total equity: ▲US$10.789 Billion (Fiscal Year Ended 31 December 2020)
- Number of employees: 5,426 (December 2023)
- Website: www.cinfin.com

Cincinnati Financial Corporation offers property and casualty insurance, its main business, through The Cincinnati Insurance Company, The Cincinnati Indemnity Company and The Cincinnati Casualty Company. The company has 1.01% of the domestic property and casualty insurance premiums, which ranks it as the 20th largest insurance company by market share in the U.S.

The Cincinnati Insurance Company was founded in 1950 by four agents, including brothers John Jack Schiff and Robert Cleveland Schiff, Chester T Field and Harry M Turner.

The Cincinnati Life Insurance Company markets life and disability income insurance and annuities. CFC Investment Company supports the insurance subsidiaries and their independent agent representatives through commercial leasing and financing activities. CinFin Capital Management Company provides asset management services to institutions, corporations and individuals.

In 2001, SFAS 133 adjustments were included with realized capital gains or losses rather than investment income. The impact on nine-month 2001 earnings was an after-tax gain of $1.3 million. Prior period 2001 results were restated on this basis.

In 2008, Cincinnati began writing excess and surplus lines insurance under a new subsidiary called the Cincinnati Specialty Underwriters Insurance Company.

MSP Underwriting, a global specialty underwriter, was acquired in February 2019, and was rebranded Cincinnati Global Underwriting Ltd. on May 1, 2019. Based in London, Cincinnati Global Underwriting Ltd. operates through Cincinnati Global Underwriting Agency Ltd., which is the Lloyd's managing agent for Cincinnati Global Syndicate 318. Collectively, the group is known as Cincinnati Global.
