= Rayne Johnson =

American country music singer

- Born: Fairfield, Ohio, U.S.
- Origin: Nashville, Tennessee, U.S.
- Genres: Country
- Occupation: Singer
- Instrument: Vocals
- Years active: 2019-present
- Labels: Mountain Road; Verge Records; Legend Entertainment; Studio2Bee

Rayne Johnson is an American country music singer. He is signed to Mountain Road Records and has charted on Billboard Country Airplay with the single "Front Seat".

== Biography ==
Johnson was born in Fairfield, Ohio. He took musical inspiration from the music that his parents listened to, and in high school he began performing locally. At the end of the first decade of the 21st century, Johnson passed an audition for American Idol but was eliminated early in the proceedings. After the audition, he returned to Ohio and continued performing locally, which led to him serving as an opening act for several country artists including Kellie Pickler and Randy Houser. He also began recording demos for other artists, which led to him receiving a recording contract. Johnson released three singles between 2018 and 2020: "Lips Like Liquor", "Laid Back", and "Front Seat". The third of these was sent to country radio in 2020. "Front Seat" was met with positive reception: Taste of Country writer Billy Dukes stated that it was "an R&B-influenced, soon-to-be-love song that showcases his vocal passion" and "a metaphor for how a girl should be treated", while Markos Papadatos of Digital Journal called it a "polished, piano-laden ballad that really tugs at the heartstrings, and it has a stirring vibe to it." "Front Seat" entered the top 40 of Country Airplay in March 2020, and #46 on Hot Country Songs and has a music video.

== Discography ==
=== Albums ===
Title	Details
Rayne Johnson	Release date: October 30, 2020; Label: Mountain Road Records / Verge Records; Formats: Digital download, streaming

=== Singles ===
Year	Single	Peak chart positions		Album
Year	Single	US Country	US Country Airplay	Album
2019	"Front Seat"	46	34	Rayne Johnson
2020	"Real Dang Good"	—	—	Rayne Johnson
2023	"Pretty Like You"	—	—	
2024	"City Limits"	—	—	
