= Township (Ohio) =

Local government in Ohio

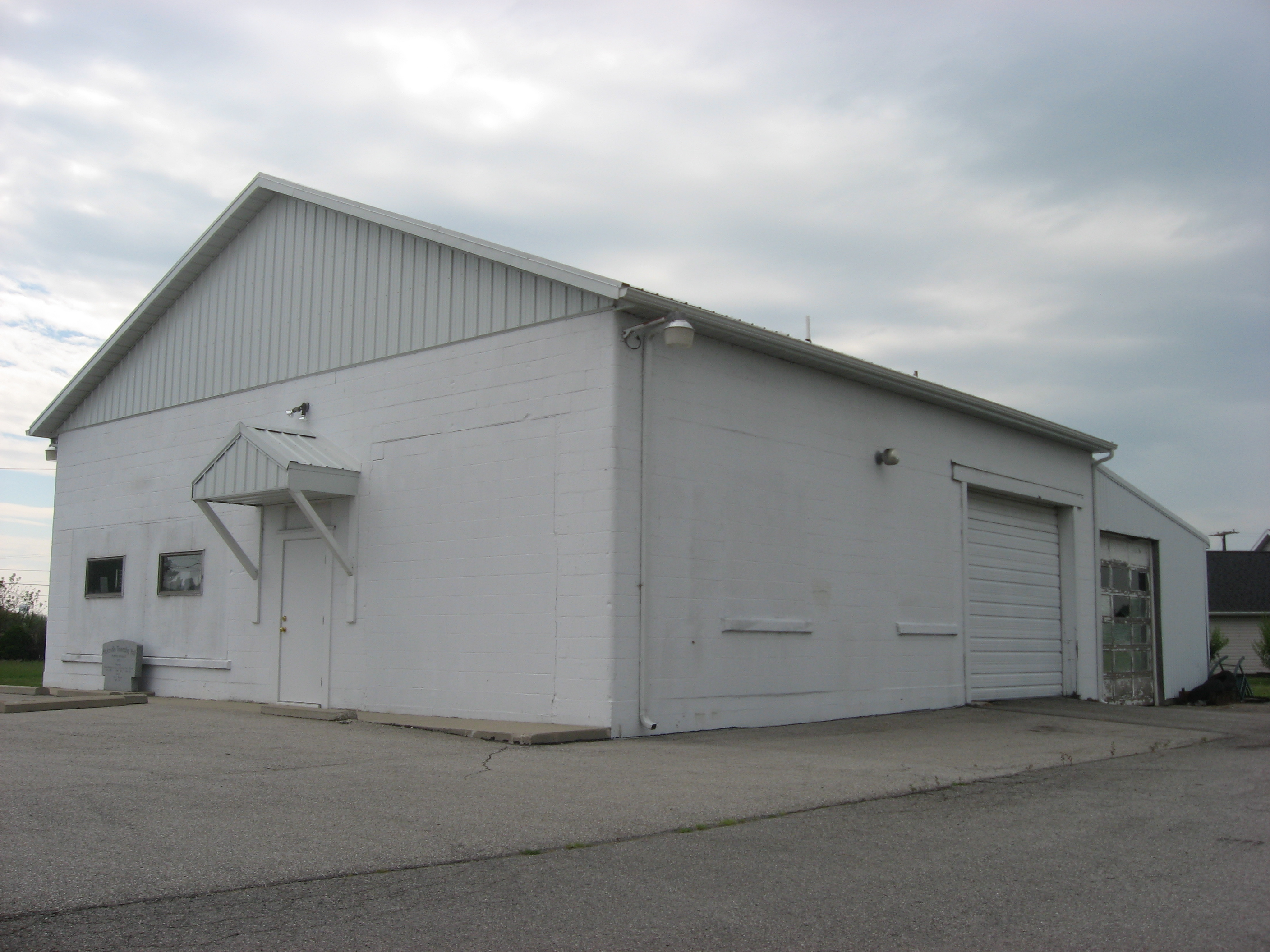
A township government building in Hicksville Township, Defiance County.

In Ohio, civil townships cover all unincorporated areas of the state as well as many incorporated areas. They are the smallest administrative divisions of the state that have their own elected governments. Each county is divided into multiple townships.

Collectively, Ohio townships have experienced a steady growth in population since the mid-20th century, despite losing land area due to municipal annexations. The unincorporated portions of the state's 1,308 townships are home to approximately 35% of the state population.

Every township has a three-member board of trustees responsible for legislation, as well as a fiscal officer who is responsible for financial administration. The powers of township government are largely controlled by state legislation. Some townships have adopted a form of limited home rule that gives them additional powers.

The township system in Ohio dates to the 1790s. Over time, some traditional powers have been taken away from township governments, while others have been added. Township governments today are responsible for various public services, including maintaining roads and bridges. They also have the authority to regulate land use in their unincorporated territory. Most Ohio townships have adopted zoning, but some have not.

== History ==
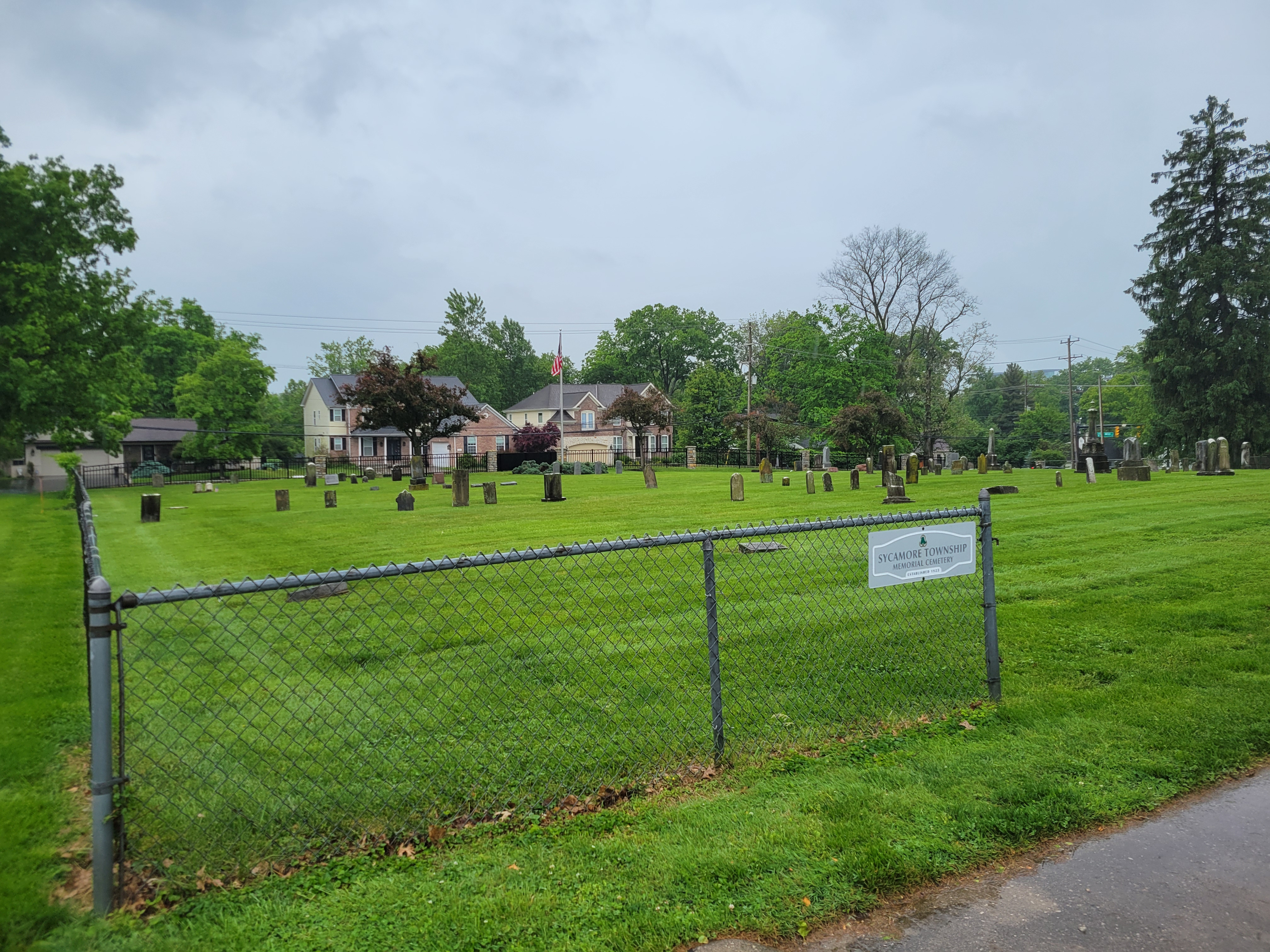
A township cemetery in Sycamore Township, Hamilton County.

Township governments were adopted in new states starting with Ohio and covering all states formed out of the Northwest Territory and across the Great Plains. The implementation of township government in Ohio and other western states generally followed the model of New York and Pennsylvania, with influences from the New England town.

Township government in Ohio predates statehood, and was provided for in general terms by the Northwest Ordinance of 1787. In 1790 the territorial government adopted a law charging the county courts of quarter sessions with organizing townships and appointing township officers. The first townships established under this law were Belpre, Waterford, and Marietta, all in Washington County. In 1795, a law was passed that provided for township assessors to be elected by popular vote.

Following statehood, an 1804 law transferred the power to create townships to the county commissioners. It also empowered any survey township of at least 80 residents to petition for civil township status. Under the law of this period, the elected officers of a township included a clerk, a treasurer, three trustees, two overseers of the poor, two fence viewers, two appraisers, and variable numbers of constables and highway supervisors. All of these officers were elected annually at the annual township meeting. If a quorum of 15 voters was not present, all the officers were appointed by the township trustees. In addition, justices of the peace were elected at the township level under the 1802 Ohio Constitution, serving three-year terms.

From 1802 to 1820, townships were nominally governed by an annual township meeting, but the duties of this meeting were largely limited to electing township officers. From 1820 to 1904, the law continued to provide for an annual township meeting, but in practice this was simply an election.

Over the years, many of the original officers of the township were abolished: fence viewers and overseers of the poor in 1845, and highway supervisors in 1917. Township appraisers or assessors were abolished in 1914, restored for personal property only in 1915, and then abolished entirely in 1925. Justices of the peace were abolished in 1959. In the same year, the role of constable changed from elected to appointed, which left the trustees and clerk as the only elected township officers.

Various powers have been added to townships over time, including cemetery administration in 1853, public health in 1875, township parks in 1904, fire protection in 1920, and waste disposal in 1941. Notable among these added functions was the regulation of land use. In 1947, after several unsuccessful bills, the General Assembly enacted legislation allowing both township and county governments to impose zoning in unincorporated areas. James Metzenbaum, a former Ohio state legislator and attorney who represented the plaintiffs in the 1926 Euclid v. Ambler case that established the constitutionality of zoning law, hailed the adoption of township zoning as "good news for the rural folk of Ohio".

In 1926, a joint committee of the 86th General Assembly recommended "the immediate abolition of the township and the transfer of its remaining functions to the county." The recommendation spurred the creation of the Ohio State Association of Township Trustees and Clerks, now the Ohio Township Association, in 1928. The legislature did not act on the recommendation.

Until 1939, each township was in charge of providing traditional outdoor relief under its own standards, while the county government was in charge of indoor relief such as poorhouses. During the Great Depression, this duty of the townships to provide poor relief became a significant burden on township government. The Federal Emergency Relief Act of 1933 created further strain on the township relief system, as some townships opted into county-level organizations to implement this new public aid structure, while others did not or switched back and forth. In 1939, the 93rd General Assembly transferred all poor relief functions to the county government.

Ohio legislation in the late 20th and early 21st centuries sought to address the problems faced by urbanized townships. In 1991, the 119th General Assembly passed a bill giving townships the option to assert limited home rule powers. An identical bill had passed in 1990 but had been vetoed by governor Dick Celeste, because of a rider that prohibited township governments from imposing any form of gun control. In 1991 George Voinovich, who did not share Celeste's objection, became governor and signed the bill after the legislature passed it again. That fall, the first four townships put the question of limited home rule before the voters: Fairfield Township of Butler County, Hamilton Township of Warren County, Jackson Township of Stark County, and Plain Township of Stark County. In 2011, the 129th General Assembly included in that year's Ohio state budget a new procedure for expedited mergers of townships with municipalities or other townships.

=== Education ===
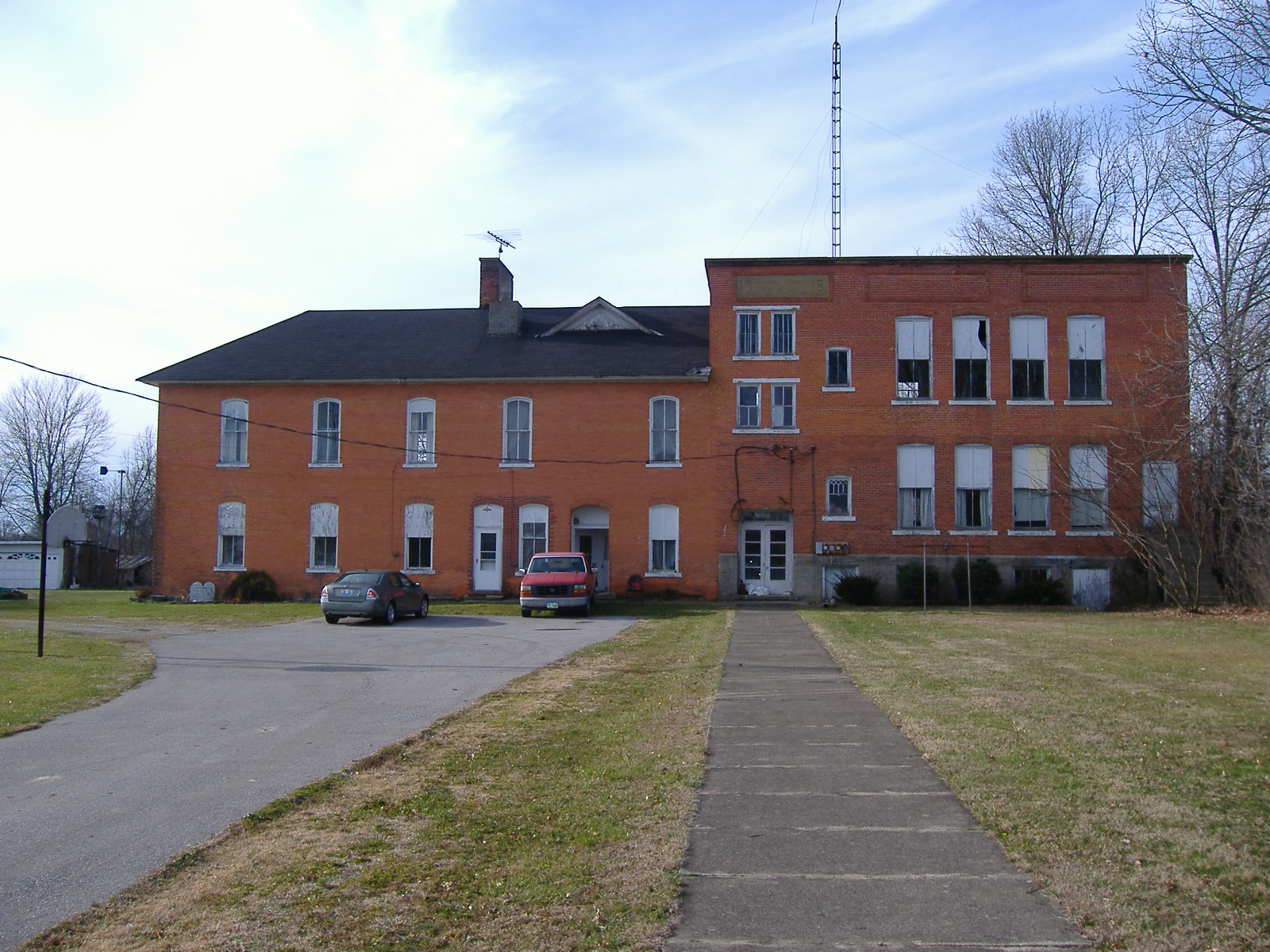
A former township high school of Whiteoak Township in Highland County.

Townships played a significant role in the development of educational systems in Ohio. In the early 19th century, township trustees were charged with managing the school lands in section 16 of each survey township.

An 1821 law gave townships the authority to divide into school districts. Although public education was controversial, most townships complied and by 1837 there were an estimated seven school districts per township. Under the Ohio school law of 1853, outside of organized municipalities, these existing school districts became subdistricts of a township school district. The township board of education was a distinct body from the township government, although the township clerk served on the board as a non-voting ex officio member. The division of authority between the township board of education and the individual districts it oversaw became a source of political tension through the 19th century. Control over the local districts was formally centralized at the township level by the Workman Law of 1892.

Beginning in 1847, state law authorized townships to consolidate their common school districts into a single "union district". With the passage of the 1853 school law, townships were authorized to establish township high schools. However, few townships availed themselves of these opportunities; Ohio had only ten township high schools in 1870 and less than a hundred in 1900, while high schools in villages and cities grew much more quickly. The same 1853 law also authorized townships to establish graded schools, but only with the consent of the voters.

These permissive laws changed in the early 20th century. In 1900, it became compulsory for all townships to provide graded schools. In 1902, the General Assembly amended the Boxwell law governing high school admission to require township boards to pay tuition for any graduates of the eighth grade wishing to attend high school, unless the township itself provided a high school.

In 1914, the General Assembly reorganized Ohio education, renaming the township school districts "rural school districts" and placing primary authority over them in the hands of new county-level school districts. This legislation severed the connection between the township and the schools, giving the county board of education the authority to redraw district lines at its own discretion.

== Government ==
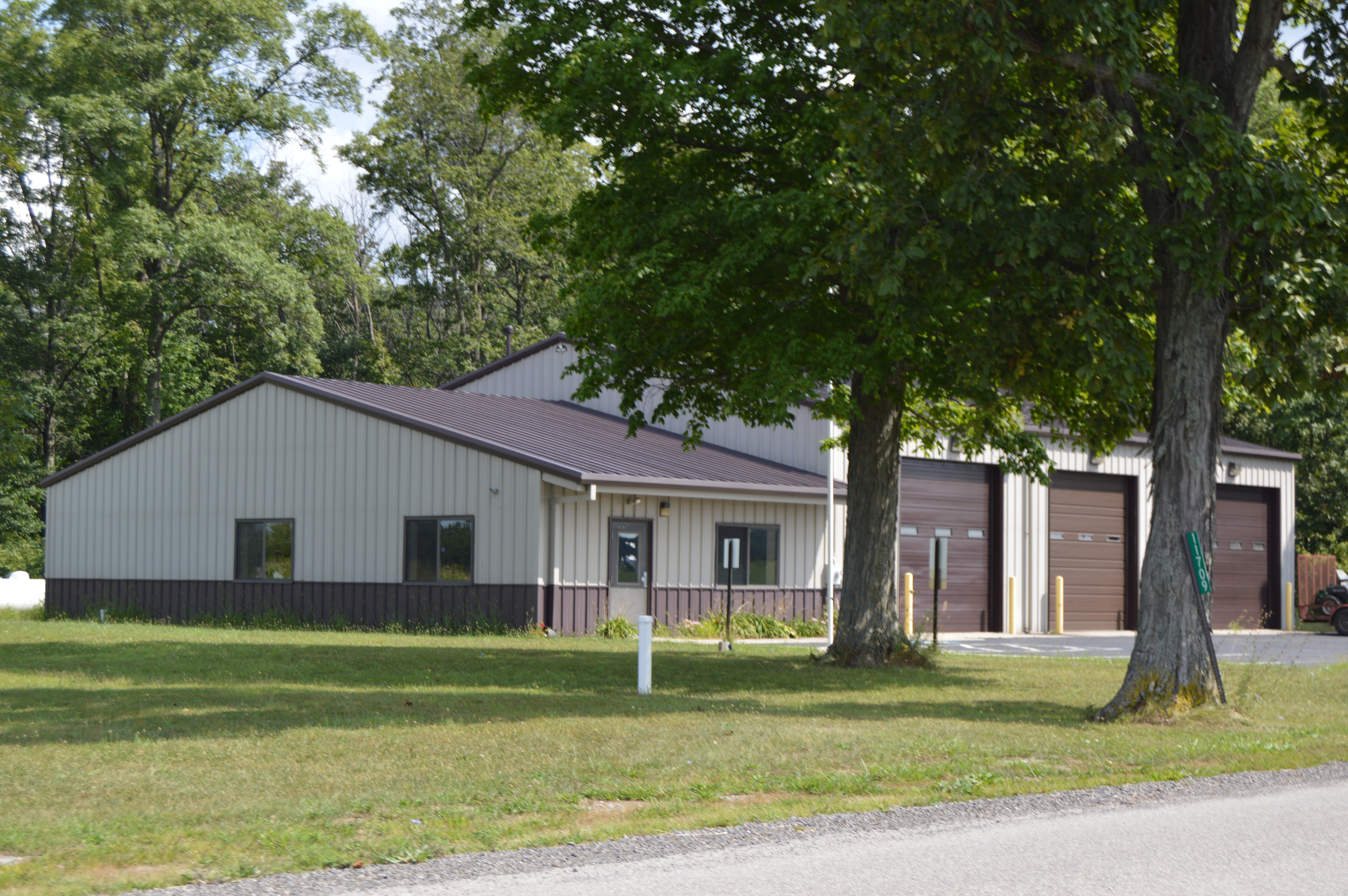
Administration building of Taylor Creek Township, Hardin County.

Each civil township in Ohio has four elected officers: three trustees and a fiscal officer. They serve overlapping four-year terms: two trustees are elected in every odd-numbered year starting from 2001 and the remaining trustee and fiscal officer are elected in every odd-numbered year starting from 2007. The trustees' terms begin on January 1 following the election, and the fiscal officer's term begins on April 1. Any vacancies that occur in these four positions are filled by a vote of the remaining trustees.

Townships are governed by Ohio state law. Certain general provisions governing townships are contained in the Constitution of Ohio. For example, Article X gives the legislature authority to provide for township officers and local taxation powers, and Article XVII limits township officers' terms of office to no more than four years. Beyond these limited constitutional provisions, statutory provisions governing townships are contained in Title V of the Ohio Revised Code.

Most townships in the state are statutory townships, which have only the powers specifically granted them by state law. Townships that have a population of at least 2,500, however, can adopt a limited form of home rule. As of 2025, 2.6% of Ohio's townships (34 out of 1,308) have chosen this option. These "limited home rule" townships do not have the full authority of home rule municipalities, as their powers are still partially limited by statute. Limited home rule townships are required to provide police services, but may do so by contract with existing agencies. They cannot create criminal offenses but can enforce township resolutions by civil fines of up to $1,000. While statutory townships must rely on the services of the county prosecutor, limited home rule townships are authorized to maintain their own legal department. Limited home rule townships also have the ability to take on higher levels of debt than statutory townships.

A township can adopt limited home rule in three different ways: in any eligible township, by a petition signed by at least 10% of eligible voters and then approved in a general election; in any township with at least 5,000 people, by a majority vote of the board to place the question before the voters, followed by approval in a general election; and in any township of at least 15,000 people, by a unanimous vote of the board, which is subject to referendum only if a petition is signed by at least 10% of eligible voters. Once a township has adopted limited home rule, it can only return to statutory government by referendum.

A limited home rule township that has over 15,000 people living in it is defined by statute as an "urban township". Urban townships have additional authority to establish and maintain parking facilities and to regulate access to township roads.

=== Public services ===
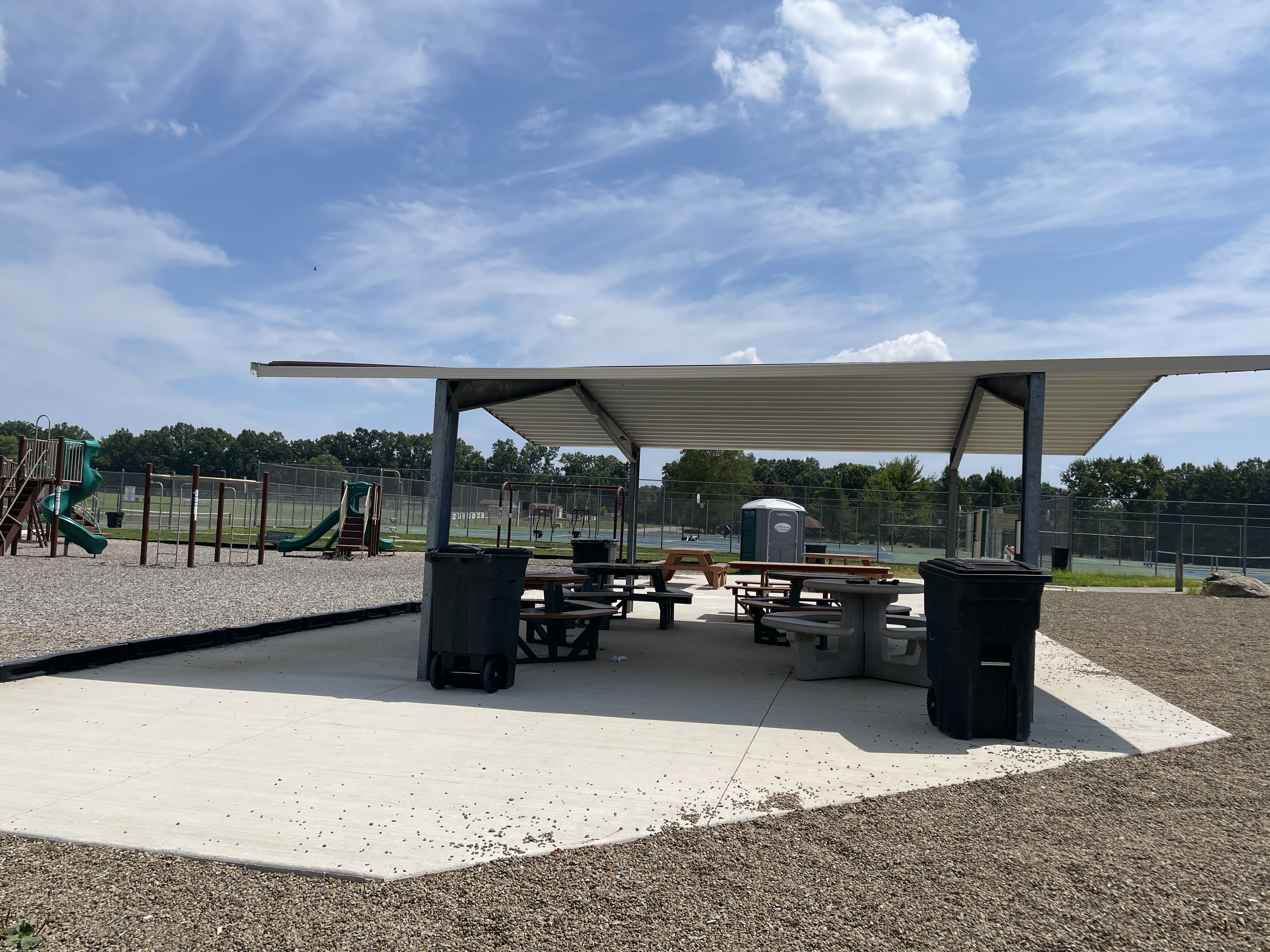
A township park in Austintown Township, Mahoning County.

Road maintenance is a core responsibility of Ohio township governments. According to the Ohio Township Association, townships maintain over 41,000 miles of road in the state.

Ohio townships are tasked with the maintenance of public cemeteries, including many private cemeteries that were subsequently transferred to the public. Over 2,400 cemeteries across Ohio are maintained by township governments.

Township governments have the authority to create, maintain and regulate township parks. They can also provide police, fire, and emergency medical services.

=== Land use regulation ===
The Ohio Revised Code gives townships authority over land use within their unincorporated territory. This is generally accomplished through zoning. As of 2025, 744 Ohio townships had adopted zoning systems. The largest number of townships without zoning are located in southeastern Ohio.

Few townships have adopted a comprehensive plan. Very few of these have dedicated planning staff, relying instead on the county planning department.

In the early 1990s, 63% of land in unincorporated townships in Ohio was in agricultural use. Many Ohio townships have faced land-use challenges due to exurban migration into these formerly rural and agricultural areas.

== Statistics ==
Map showing all existing Ohio townships, including paper townships.

There are 1,308 townships currently existing in Ohio. They are found in all counties, although Cuyahoga County only has two. The fastest-growing and largest townships by population are mostly found along the Interstate 71 corridor that connects the metropolitan areas of Cleveland, Columbus, and Cincinnati.

As of the 2020 census, Ohio's largest township by population is West Chester Township in Butler County, with over 65,000 residents. The smallest townships by population have fewer than 100 residents.

In 2000, more than 3.8 million Ohio residents, or 34% of the state's population, resided in an unincorporated area of a township. That population and proportion had risen over time, from 2.7 million and 28% in 1960. As of 2025, the proportion is estimated at 35%.

The Census Bureau recognizes 1,604 minor civil divisions in Ohio. Among these are 1,324 townships; in addition to those with functioning township governments, this includes 15 fictitious townships created by the Census Bureau to account for situations in which a township-independent municipality annexed an entire township but did not formally remove that territory from the township, and one township (Wayne Township of Montgomery County) with no population. The Census Bureau also recognizes 274 other minor civil divisions in Ohio, sometimes called paper townships, which correspond to municipalities that are independent of any township.

== Boundaries ==
The boundaries of townships in Ohio are set by the county commissioners of the relevant county. County commissioners are also authorized to resolve boundary disputes between townships. Many township boundaries follow the original survey township lines.

When part of a township is annexed into a municipality, it also remains part of the township and subject to township taxes unless the municipality successfully petitions to redraw the township boundary. In that situation, people residing in the annexed portion of the township have the right to vote and hold office in both the township and the municipal government. If the entire township is annexed, it ceases to exist as a legal entity. Annexation of an entire township into a municipality is referred to as a "merger", and requires the consent of the township's voters. A township does not have authority over partial annexations of its territory, but it can hire an attorney to represent its interests in the annexation proceeding.

Townships do not have the authority to annex new territory on their own. Since 2011, however, a process has been defined by statute by which two or more townships can merge to create a new township. In addition, municipalities that have not withdrawn from their township and have extended across township or county boundaries can petition to have the boundaries of the township revised to correspond to the municipal boundaries. As a result, four townships in Ohio cross county boundaries: Canaan Township of Wayne County, Washington Township of Franklin County, and Fairfield and Perry townships of Columbiana County.

Of these, Washington Township of Franklin County is the only township in Ohio to have territory in three counties, as a result of annexations by the city of Dublin. Dublin's power to cause township boundaries to be redrawn to conform to the city's boundaries following annexation, even when those boundaries crossed county lines, was upheld by a 1991 decision of the Ohio Supreme Court. One result of this revision of township boundaries across county lines is that Union County has two townships named Washington.

Annexation of townships has played a role in broader disputes over racial segregation in Ohio. In Twinsburg Township, in 1967 the township's segregated white communities attempted to merge with neighboring Twinsburg, Ohio, leaving only the majority-African American community of Twinsburg Heights in the township. A trustee who led the legal battle against this annexation had his greenhouse dynamited. The legal challenge ultimately prevailed, on the ground that the territory to be annexed was unreasonably large. Opponents of annexation of a township by a nearby municipality have also been accused of racist motivations, for example in cases of suburban townships resisting annexation into Akron and Dayton.

== Works cited ==
- Bethel, Alyssa (2025-11-17). "Limited Home Rule Townships" (PDF). Members Brief. Vol. 136. Ohio Legislative Service Commission.
- Bossing, Nelson L. (1930). "The History of Educational Legislation in Ohio from 1851 to 1925". Ohio History Journal. 39: 78–219.
- Conroy, Maria Manta; Jun, Hee-Jung (2016). "Planning process influences on sustainability in Ohio township plans". Journal of Environmental Planning and Management. doi:10.1080/09640568.2015.1103709.
- Dewey, Stanley Eugene (1964). The Ohio township as a local government unit: a study in obsolescence and adaptation (Ph.D. thesis). The Ohio State University.
- Essner, Howard S. (1981). "Municipal Annexation in Ohio". Akron Law Review. 14 (4).
- Faber, Keith (2019). Ohio Township Handbook (PDF). Ohio Auditor of State.
- Gerberich, John Adam (1922). History of Secondary Education of Ohio, 1803-1922. University of Wisconsin--Madison.
- Guitteau, William Backus (1949). Ohio's Townships, the Grassroots of Democracy. Toledo Printing Company.
- Lewis, Leona S. (1923). The evolution of the township in Ohio (pdf). The Ohio State University.
- McMillen, Wayne (1935-09-01). "Unemployment Relief in Ohio". Social Service Review. 9 (3). The University of Chicago Press: 464–483. doi:10.1086/631686.
- Neem, Johann N. (January 2016). "Path Dependence and the Emergence of Common Schools: Ohio to 1853". Journal of Policy History. 28 (1): 48–80. doi:10.1017/S0898030615000378.
- Ohio Department of Development (August 2021). "Population & Household Counts for Governmental Units: 2020, 2010, 2000" (PDF).
- "Overview of Township Government in Ohio" (PDF). Ohio Township Association. February 2025.
- Sharp, Jeff S.; Reece, Jason W. (2001). "Township Growth & Change: Population Characteristics of Ohio's Townships 1960 to 2000" (PDF). Ohio State University Extension.
- Wilgus, James Alva (1896). Evolution of Township Government in Ohio. U.S. Government Printing Office.
