= Western International Market =

Wholesale market in London, United Kingdom

Coordinates: 51°29′46″N 0°24′14″W

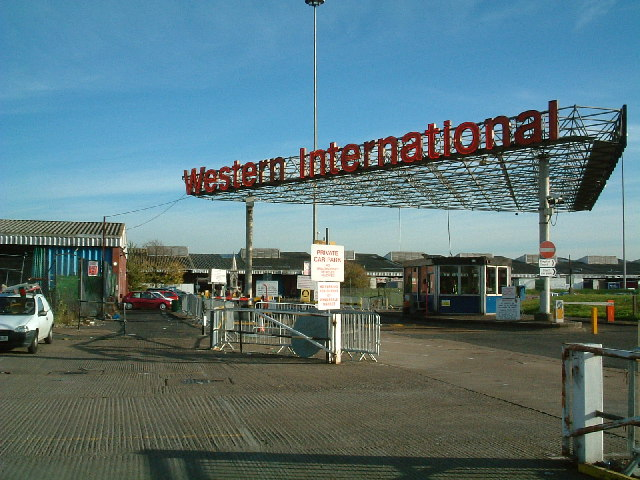
Western International Market

The Western International Market is a wholesale market in west London, England. One of the principal wholesale markets in the London region, it is located between Southall and Hayes, close to the M4 motorway and Heathrow Airport, and covers an area of 86 acres (350,000 m^{2}).

Owned and managed by Hounslow London Borough Council, the market opened in 1974 as a relocation of Brentford Market, which dated from 1306 and since 1893 had been based on a site near Kew Bridge. A fountain at the foot of the bridge, erected in 1877, now stands at the entrance to Western International Market and has Grade II listed status.

The market acts as a conduit for fresh produce airlifted to Heathrow to reach the retail and catering trades.
