= Holly Morris (television reporter) =

American journalist

- Born: 1971 (age 54–55); Cincinnati, Ohio
- Education: Duke University
- Occupation: Special interest reporter
- Children: Hayden Espy

Holly Morris was a television reporter for WTTG in Washington D.C. from 1998 to 2024. She is originally from Cincinnati, Ohio. She graduated from Duke University in 1993 with a degree in civil engineering.

Morris was part of a team of four anchors for the morning newscast from 4:30 am to 9 am, and the Good Day DC show from 9 am to 11 am. She was known at the station for her remote reporting during the early morning news covering community events where she often participated in the activities she reported on. On March 15, 2024, Morris said goodbye to FOX 5 and local TV news.

She has won four regional Emmy awards., for "Best Live Reporting" as well as a regional Edward R. Murrow award.

In 2014, Morris helped to raise awareness of the disease ALS by participating in the Ice Bucket Challenge during a segment on Fox 5. She was ridiculed on the nationally syndicated radio show, the Don and Mike Show which in 2007 featured a weekly "Wheel of Holly" segment where tapes of her past features were played at random.

== Personal ==
Morris married lawyer Thomas Espy on July 21, 2007. They live in Rockville, Maryland and have a son named Hayden Espy.
