= Fairfield, Ohio =

City in Ohio, US

- City
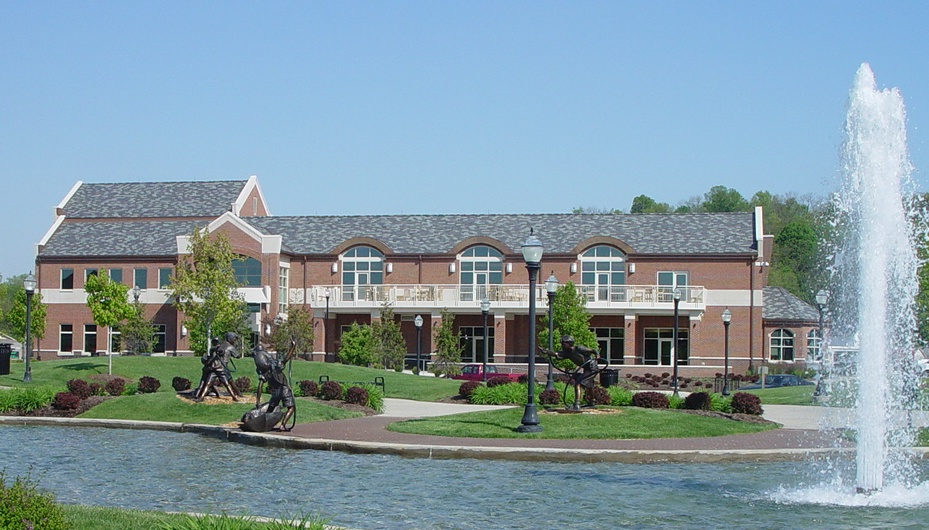
- Fairfield Community Arts Center

- Flag Seal Logo
- Nickname: City of Opportunity
- Interactive map of Fairfield, Ohio
- Location within Ohio Location within the United States
- Coordinates: 39°19′44″N 84°32′34″W
- Country: United States
- State: Ohio
- Counties: Butler, Hamilton
- Founded: 1787
- Incorporated: 1954 (village); 1955 (city)

Government
  - Type: Council–manager
  - Mayor: Steve Miller
  - City manager: Scott W. Timmer

Area
  - Total: 20.92 sq mi (54.18 km^{2})
  - Land: 20.83 sq mi (53.96 km^{2})
  - Water: 0.085 sq mi (0.22 km^{2})
- Elevation: 646 ft (197 m)

Population (2020)
  - Total: 44,907
  - Estimate (2023): 44,447
  - Density: 2,155.5/sq mi (832.25/km^{2})
- Time zone: UTC-5 (EST)
  - Summer (DST): UTC-4 (Eastern Daylight Saving Time)
- ZIP code(s): 45014 (with small portions consisting of 45011 (mainly Hamilton, Ohio) & 45069 (mainly West Chester Township, Butler County, Ohio))
- Area code: 513
- FIPS code: 39-25970
- GNIS feature ID: 1085670
- Website: www.fairfield-city.org

Fairfield is a city in southern Butler County, Ohio, United States. It is a suburb located about 25 miles (40 km) north of Cincinnati and is situated on the east bank of the Great Miami River. The population was 44,907 as of the 2020 census. Incorporated in 1955 from portions of Fairfield Township, it includes the former hamlets of Symmes Corner, Fair Play, Furmandale, and Stockton. The Fairfield City School District is one of the largest in Ohio and serves both the city and Fairfield Township.

== History ==
=== Early history ===
Prior to European settlement the Fairfield area was home to several Indian tribes, most prominently the Shawnee and the Miami. The prehistoric Hopewell and Adena peoples constructed numerous earthworks around the city, though most were unwittingly removed by early settlers in order to accommodate farm fields.

The area that is now Fairfield was part of the original Symmes Purchase. Also known as the Miami Purchase, the region was acquired by Judge John Cleves Symmes from the Continental Congress in 1788 and included much of the land between the Little Miami and Great Miami rivers that became the present day counties of Hamilton, Butler, and Warren.

As the area was settled hamlets developed to serve the surrounding countryside. Judge Symmes' great-nephew, Celadon Symmes, was the founder and first settler of Symmes Corner. Located at the intersection of Pleasant Avenue and Nilles Road it now serves as Fairfield's town center. The hamlet of Fair Play was located on the east bank of the Great Miami River. It was known for its mills, including Ohio's first paper mill. The community was destroyed by a flood in the late 1800s. Today the Miami Chapel Cemetery and the Fair Play School are some of the few remaining vestiges of the village.

In the 1850s, the Cincinnati, Hamilton & Dayton Railway (today CSX) was extended through Fairfield, fostering the development of several communities. The villages of Schencks Station and Stockton were established along the rail line. Schencks Station was located near the present-day intersection of Symmes Road and State Route 4 and was named for local landowner Aaron Schenck. Stockton could be found at the crossroads of State Route 4 and Seward Road. Originally known as Jones Station, the village provided area farms with necessities including a smithy, a general store, churches, and a school. In between the two communities was the village of Furmandale; also known as Schnapstown or Snaptown. Located at the current intersection of Winton and Nilles roads, the community took its name from Nathaniel Furman who operated a private school for girls within the community. A few miles to the east of these communities was the Miami-Erie Canal which, prior to the arrival of the railroad, enabled early settlers to move their commodities to market.

=== Growth and incorporation ===
Fairfield remained a quiet, primarily agricultural community until the mid-20th century. As the City of Hamilton grew its industry expanded south into present day Fairfield. Fisher Body, a manufacturing division of General Motors, established a plant at the northeast corner of State Route 4 and Symmes Road near the location of what was Schencks Station. During the same timeframe Fairfield started to experience residential growth, initially as a southern suburb of Hamilton. In 1954 a group of citizens wishing to avoid annexation into Hamilton organized an incorporation campaign. The initial petition was to create a municipal corporation from Fairfield Township in its entirety. A referendum was held in April 1954 with incorporation failing by a vote of 1,219 to 831. A renewed effort focused on those precincts that voted affirmatively. A second referendum was held in July 1954 with incorporation winning by a vote of 738 to 216. Fairfield was established as a statutory village in 1955 with a mayor-council form of government.

The next 30 years represented a period of rapid growth for the community. By 1960 the village had exceeded a population of 5,000 and was reclassified as a statutory city. The Interstate 275 beltway was constructed around Cincinnati in the late 1970s. The new road provided easy access to Fairfield from the northern Cincinnati suburbs, thus providing an additional high quality transportation route. This, in turn, drove substantial commercial and residential investment in the community.

=== Growing pains and stabilization ===
The city's form-of-government was a subject of debate almost from its inception. In 1961 a charter commission was formed to study the issue. After due consideration the commission recommended adoption of a charter with the council-administrator form of government, but the initiative was rejected by the voters. The question resurfaced in 1971, but did not progress beyond council conversations. In 1976 the issue gained momentum with form-of-government becoming an issue in council campaigns. In 1978 a charter commission was established and charged with framing a charter that would establish a council-administrator form-of-government. The city's second charter commission spent eight months researching the charters of various Ohio communities. A referendum was held on June 5, 1979, in which the issue was approved by a vote of 1,423 to 1,265. The council-administrator (later council-manager) form went into effect on January 1, 1980.

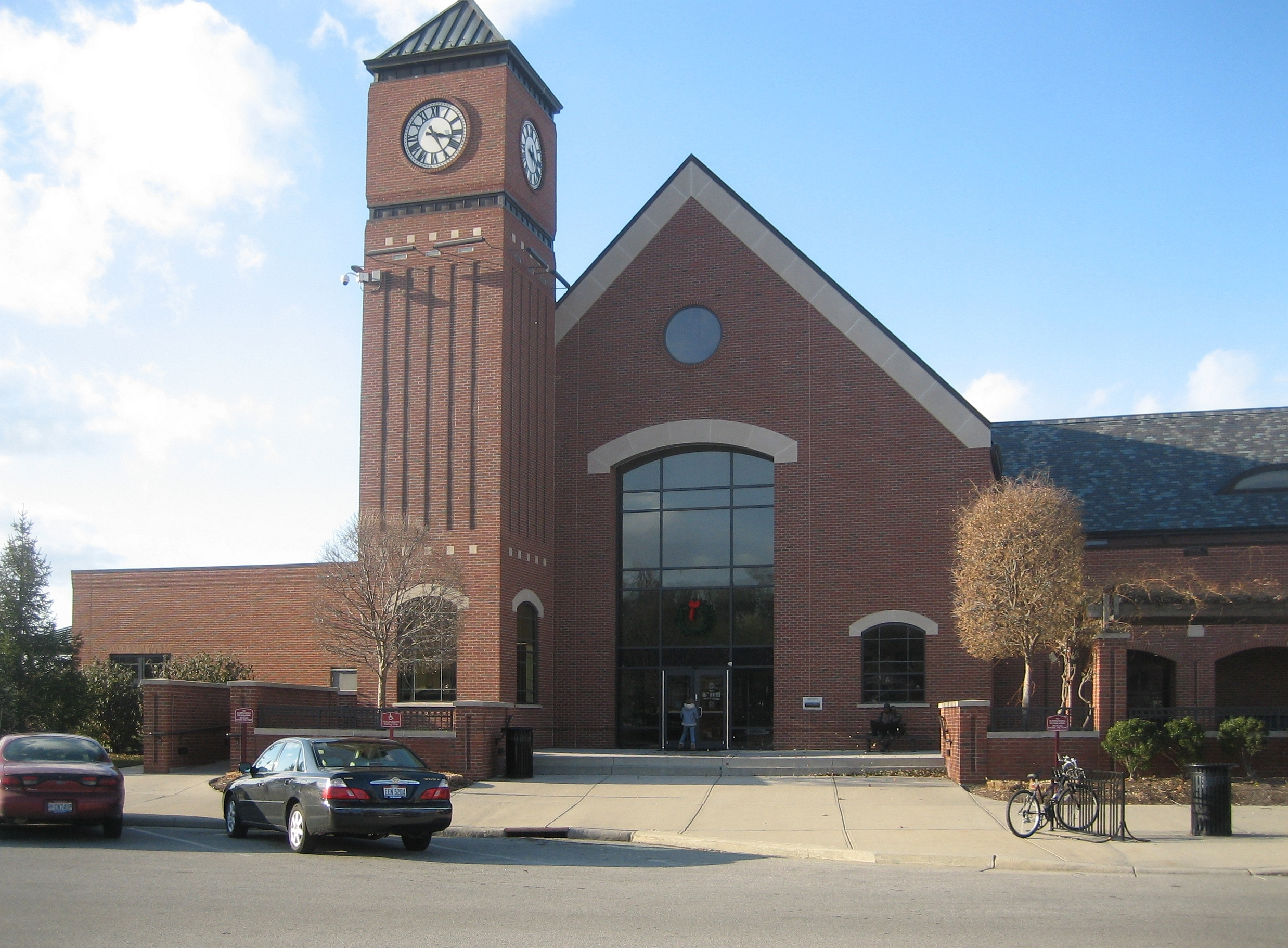
Fairfied Lane Library in 2006

General Motors announced that the Hamilton-Fairfield Chevrolet Pontiac Canada Group, known as the Fisher Body plant, would be phased out in the first quarter of 1989. The effect of the plant closing was a loss of 2,500 jobs and 28 percent of the city's income tax revenue, amounting to $1.7 million.

The city regained economic balance in the 1990s and experienced wide, diverse business development. With a population of 39,729 at the beginning of 1990, the city's explosive population growth had begun to slow, allowing it to focus on quality development of remaining residential and commercial areas. During this time, Fairfield updated and expanded its sanitary sewers, established detention basins for better stormwater control, continued to address road improvements, and established a community center.

In 1995, Fairfield withdraw from Fairfield, Union, and Springfield townships via a paper township called "Heritage Township", reusing a name from a previous failed attempt to incorporate Symmes and Deerfield townships as a city.

== Geography ==
According to the United States Census Bureau, the city has a total area of 21.06 square miles (54.55 km^{2}), of which 20.94 square miles (54.23 km^{2}) is land and 0.12 square miles (0.31 km^{2}) is water. The Butler County line serves as Fairfield's southern corporate boundary with a small portion of the City extending into Hamilton County. This portion contains no population. The city is bounded on the north by the City of Hamilton and the eponymously named Fairfield Township; the east by West Chester and Fairfield townships; the south by the cities of Springdale and Forest Park as well as Springfield and Colerain townships; and on the west by Fairfield and Ross townships. The city is bisected by a major rail line and is served by several interstate, federal and state highways which provide for excellent access. This transportation infrastructure has contributed to Fairfield's economic success.

Most of Fairfield sits on top of the Great Miami Buried Valley Aquifer; one of the largest underground reservoirs in the Midwest. The aquifer provides a clean and safe source of drinking water for communities up and down the course of the Great Miami River. The cities of Fairfield, Hamilton and Cincinnati operate water production facilities within Fairfield corporate boundaries; all of which draw from the aquifer.

=== Climate ===
Climate data for Fairfield, Ohio (1991–2020 normals, extremes 1913–present)
Month	Jan	Feb	Mar	Apr	May	Jun	Jul	Aug	Sep	Oct	Nov	Dec	Year
Record high °F (°C)	77 (25)	78 (26)	89 (32)	93 (34)	99 (37)	106 (41)	111 (44)	107 (42)	103 (39)	96 (36)	83 (28)	75 (24)	111 (44)
Mean maximum °F (°C)	61.7 (16.5)	66.0 (18.9)	75.4 (24.1)	83.1 (28.4)	89.2 (31.8)	94.0 (34.4)	96.2 (35.7)	95.8 (35.4)	92.6 (33.7)	84.9 (29.4)	73.0 (22.8)	64.1 (17.8)	97.5 (36.4)
Mean daily maximum °F (°C)	38.2 (3.4)	42.4 (5.8)	52.8 (11.6)	65.7 (18.7)	75.4 (24.1)	83.5 (28.6)	87.3 (30.7)	86.6 (30.3)	79.9 (26.6)	67.4 (19.7)	53.7 (12.1)	42.5 (5.8)	64.6 (18.1)
Daily mean °F (°C)	29.5 (−1.4)	32.7 (0.4)	41.8 (5.4)	53.2 (11.8)	63.5 (17.5)	72.2 (22.3)	75.9 (24.4)	74.7 (23.7)	67.5 (19.7)	55.1 (12.8)	43.1 (6.2)	34.2 (1.2)	53.6 (12.0)
Mean daily minimum °F (°C)	20.8 (−6.2)	23.0 (−5.0)	30.9 (−0.6)	40.7 (4.8)	51.6 (10.9)	60.8 (16.0)	64.6 (18.1)	62.7 (17.1)	55.0 (12.8)	42.9 (6.1)	32.5 (0.3)	25.8 (−3.4)	42.6 (5.9)
Mean minimum °F (°C)	0.7 (−17.4)	5.2 (−14.9)	15.1 (−9.4)	26.7 (−2.9)	37.8 (3.2)	48.5 (9.2)	55.1 (12.8)	52.9 (11.6)	42.0 (5.6)	30.0 (−1.1)	19.7 (−6.8)	10.1 (−12.2)	−3.0 (−19.4)
Record low °F (°C)	−23 (−31)	−16 (−27)	−8 (−22)	13 (−11)	27 (−3)	31 (−1)	45 (7)	39 (4)	27 (−3)	17 (−8)	0 (−18)	−19 (−28)	−23 (−31)
Average precipitation inches (mm)	3.38 (86)	2.95 (75)	3.93 (100)	4.94 (125)	4.93 (125)	4.37 (111)	3.92 (100)	3.45 (88)	3.27 (83)	3.29 (84)	3.16 (80)	3.45 (88)	45.04 (1,144)
Average precipitation days (≥ 0.01 in)	9.2	7.8	10.2	11.3	11.8	10.4	8.9	7.3	6.7	8.0	8.3	9.0	108.9
Source: NOAA

== Demographics ==
Historical population
Census	Pop.	Note	%±
1960	9,734		—
1970	14,680		50.8%
1980	30,777		109.7%
1990	39,729		29.1%
2000	42,097		6.0%
2010	42,510		1.0%
2020	44,907		5.6%
2025 (est.)	44,682		−0.5%
U.S. Decennial Census

=== 2020 census ===
As of the 2020 census, Fairfield had a population of 44,907 and a population density of 2,155.47 people per square mile (832.25/km^{2}). There were 19,030 housing units, 4.1% of which were vacant; the homeowner vacancy rate was 1.0% and the rental vacancy rate was 5.5%.

Of the 18,243 households in Fairfield, 29.6% had children under the age of 18 living in them. Among all households, 44.1% were married couples living together, 19.7% had a male householder with no spouse or partner present, and 29.2% had a female householder with no spouse or partner present. About 29.9% of households were made up of individuals, and 11.7% had someone living alone who was 65 years of age or older. The average household size was 2.40, and the average family size was 3.01.

The median age was 39.4 years; 22.0% of residents were under the age of 18 and 18.0% were 65 years of age or older. For every 100 females there were 93.7 males, and for every 100 females age 18 and over there were 90.9 males age 18 and over.

99.9% of residents lived in urban areas, while 0.1% lived in rural areas.

Racial composition as of the 2020 census
Race	Number	Percent
White	29,088	64.8%
Black or African American	7,847	17.5%
American Indian and Alaska Native	186	0.4%
Asian	2,658	5.9%
Native Hawaiian and Other Pacific Islander	64	0.1%
Some other race	2,034	4.5%
Two or more races	3,030	6.7%
Hispanic or Latino (of any race)	3,607	8.0%

=== American Community Survey (2016–2020) ===
According to the U.S. Census American Community Survey for the period 2016–2020 the estimated median annual income for a household in the city was $63,418, and the median income for a family was $79,550. About 7.1% of the population were living below the poverty line, including 6.8% of those under age 18 and 8.2% of those age 65 or over. About 63.8% of the population were employed, and 30.6% had a bachelor's degree or higher.

=== 2010 census ===
As of the census of 2010, there were 42,510 people, 17,415 households, and 11,372 families residing in the city. The population density was 2,030.1 inhabitants per square mile (783.8/km^{2}). There were 18,803 housing units at an average density of 897.9 per square mile (346.7/km^{2}). The racial makeup of the city was 79.0% White, 12.8% African American, 0.3% Native American, 2.4% Asian, 0.1% Pacific Islander, 3.0% from other races, and 2.4% from two or more races. Hispanic or Latino of any race were 5.5% of the population.

There were 17,415 households, of which 32.1% had children under the age of 18 living with them, 47.2% were married couples living together, 13.1% had a female householder with no husband present, 4.9% had a male householder with no wife present, and 34.7% were non-families. 28.7% of all households were made up of individuals, and 9.3% had someone living alone who was 65 years of age or older. The average household size was 2.41 and the average family size was 2.97.

The median age in the city was 38.3 years. 23.2% of residents were under the age of 18; 8.6% were between the ages of 18 and 24; 27.4% were from 25 to 44; 28% were from 45 to 64; and 13% were 65 years of age or older. The gender makeup of the city was 48.2% male and 51.8% female.

== Economy ==
Fairfield has a highly diversified economy without a dominant industry, though two of the city's top employers are insurance companies. The corporate headquarters of insurance company Cincinnati Financial is located in Fairfield.

Jungle Jim's International Market is a regional tourism destination featuring food and beverage items from all over the world. Jim Bonaminio started the market in 1971 as a produce stand. A reluctant planning commission approved his request on the condition that he would ultimately construct a permanent storefront. Today Jungle Jim's International Market has 50,000 weekly shoppers and annual sales of nearly $100 million.

=== Top employers ===
As of 2025 Fairfield's largest employers were:

Rank	Employer	Number of Employees
1	Cincinnati Financial	3,300
2	Koch Foods	2,000
3	Mercy Health — Fairfield Hospital	1,350
4	Fairfield City School District	1,000
5	Pacific Manufacturing	900
6	Express Scripts	500
7	Martin Brower	450
8	Jungle Jim's	435
9	Takumi Stamping	425
10	Veritiv	365
Source: City of Fairfield

== Government ==
The City of Fairfield is a charter municipality and operates under the council–manager form of government, consisting of an elected mayor and city council in addition to an appointed city manager. As of 2026, the mayor is Steve Miller and the city manager is Scott W. Timmer.

Fairfield City Council consists of seven members, three of whom are elected at-large with the remainder elected by ward. Council members serve staggered, four-year terms with the ward members running together, followed two years later by the at-large members and the mayor. The mayor, who is directly elected and also serves a four-year term, acts as the official and ceremonial head of the government and presides over all meetings of the council. Mayoral duties include the right to introduce legislation and to take part in discussion of all matters before the council, with the right to vote in the event of a tie. The Mayor appoints the chairs of the various council committees and issues official proclamations. Council, in addition to appointing the city manager and passing legislation, approves the annual operating, capital and tax budgets, contracts in the city's name, levies taxes, appoints board and commission members, and appoints the law director and the clerk of council.

The city manager is responsible for the day-to-day operations of the city, implements Council action, hires and oversees the staff, prepares and implements the annual operating and capital budgets and keeps the elected officials advised of the city's financial sustainability.

The Fairfield Municipal Court is part of the city from a budgetary perspective, but otherwise operates as a completely autonomous agency. Municipal court judges in Ohio are elected to six-year terms on a nonpartisan judicial ballot.

== Recreation ==
Fairfield operates a parks and recreation system with over 500 acres of parkland. Harbin Park is the city's largest at 230 acres. It annually hosts the Cincinnati Cyclocross, a cycling competition spread over three days and three Greater Cincinnati communities. Harbin also plays host to the city's Red White & Kaboom fireworks show held annually on July 3 in celebration of Independence Day.

Marsh Lake Park was acquired from the Martin–Marietta Corporation in 2017. The city had, since the early 1990s, leased the eastern portion of the property from Martin–Marietta. Per the terms of an agreement between the city and the company the property was deeded to Fairfield upon the cessation of mining operations in 2017.

Huffman Park is one of the city's newest recreational facilities. It was donated, developed and dedicated in 2012 in memory of Fairfield residents Anna and Harold Huffman who owned and lived on the property for more than 50 years. Funding for the development of the park was provided by the Anna & Harold W. Huffman Foundation. It promotes ecology with plantings of native species and a prairie that provides wildlife habitat.

In addition to the park system, city facilities include the Community Arts Center; the 1817 Elisha Morgan Mansion; and the Village Green Amphitheater that hosts the seasonal Groovin' on the Green Concert Series, 4th Friday Concert Series and the Village Green Farmer's Market. The city operates two municipal golf courses and an aquatic center.

Fairfield is also home to Cincinnati Gymnastics Academy, which has coached various Olympians.

== Transportation ==
Public transit in the city is provided by the Butler County Regional Transit Authority and the Southwest Ohio Regional Transit Authority.

== Education ==
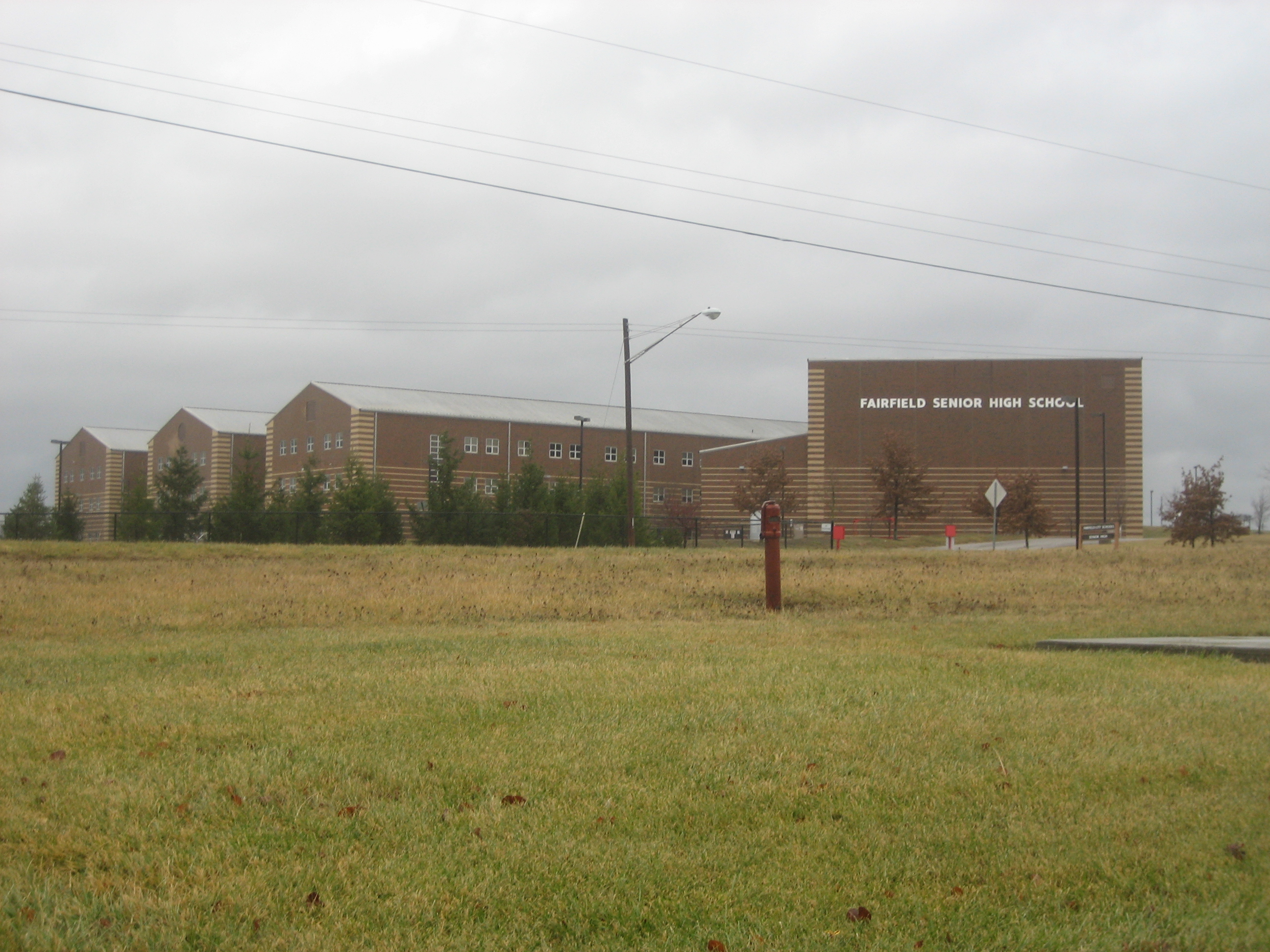
Fairfield High School

Fairfield City School District operates Fairfield High School as well as the Fairfield Freshmen School, two middle schools and six elementary schools. Parochial education options include Sacred Heart of Jesus School, Stephen T. Badin High School and Cincinnati Christian schools. A branch campus of Miami University is located a few miles north of Fairfield in the City of Hamilton. The Fairfield Lane Library is a branch of the Lane Public Library system.

== Notable people ==
- Jackson Carman, Miami Dolphins player
- Angelo Dawkins, WWE wrestler
- Rayne Johnson, country singer
- Eric Lange, actor
- Holly Morris (television reporter), television reporter
- Joe Nuxhall, Cincinnati Reds player and announcer
- Reckless Ben, YouTuber and documentarian
- Tom Segura, stand-up comedian
