= Michael Boulter =

British paleobiologist (1942–2025)

Michael Charles Boulter (22 November 1942 – 4 December 2025) was a British professor for paleobiology at the Natural History Museum and the University of East London.

Boulter studied botany, geology, and chemistry at the University College London. He taught paleobiology at the University of East London from 1989 to 2002. He served as editor to the Palaeontological Association (1975–81), secretary to the International Organisation of Palaeobotany (1981–2002) and UK representative at the International Union of Biological Sciences. In 2002 he became notable for his book "Extinction: Evolution and the End of Man" where he explained that humankind may be closer to extinction than previously believed. Together with Michael Benton and about 100 other scientists he launched the project "Fossil Record 2", the world's largest database with fossil remains from the past 500 million years.

Boulter died on 4 December 2025.

== Selected works ==
- 1971: A palynological study of two of the Neogene plant beds in Derbyshire. Bulletin of the British Museum Natural History 19, 359–410.
- 1971: with P.T. Walsh et al. The Brassington Formation: a newly recognised Tertiary formation. Nature 231, 134–136.
- 1972: with P.T. Walsh et al. Preservation of Neogene Pocket Deposits of the southern Pennines and their bearing on the evolution of upland Britain. J. Geological Society 128, 519–559.
- 1978: with D. Curry et al. A Correlation of the Tertiary Rocks of the British Isles. Geological Society of London 83pp.
- 1980: with G.C. Wilkinson. Oligocene pollen and spores from the western part of the British Isles. Palaeontographica B 175, 27–83.
- 1981: with M.E. Collinson et al. Floristic changes indicate a cooling climate in the Eocene of southern England. Nature 291, 315–317.
- 1983: with RN.L.B. Hubbard. Reconstruction of Palaeogene climate from palynological evidence. Nature 301, 147–150.
- 1988: with R.A. Spicer et al. Patterns of plant extinction from some palaeobotanical evidence. In: Fossils and Climate, OUP. 1–36.
- 1989: with Z. Kvacek. The Palaeocene Flora of the Isle of Mull. Sp. Pap. Palaeontology 41, 249pp.
- 1994: with H. Fisher (Eds.) Cenozoic Plants and Climates of the Arctic (Nato a S I Series Series I, Global Environmental Change, Springer Verlag. 401pp.
- 1997: A Lost Continent in a Temperate Arctic. Endeavour 21, 105–8.
- 1999: with D. Hewzulla et al. Evolutionary patterns from mass originations and mass extinctions. Proceedings Royal Society B 354, 463–9.
- 2002: Extinction: Evolution and the End of Man. Fourth Estate, 210pp.
- 2002: with J.-F. Manen. The complex history of the genus Ilex. Plant Systematics Evolution 235, 79–98.
- 2008: Darwin's Garden - Down House and The Origin of Species. Constable, 251pp.
- 2017: Bloomsbury Scientists: Science and Art in the Wake of Darwin. UCL Press, 175pp.

== References and external links ==
- Short biographical note (German)
- Publication list Michael C. Boulter
