= Brian Bolter =

American journalist

Brian Bolter is an American former television news anchor and reporter, and currently a restaurateur.

== Career ==
Bolter worked at KHBS-TV in Fort Smith, Arkansas, KARK-TV in Little Rock, Arkansas, KHQA-TV in Quincy, Illinois, and at WBAL-TV in Baltimore, Maryland.

He worked as the principal anchor at WTTG-TV in Washington, DC between 1999 and 2013, co-anchoring the flagship 10pm newscast with Shawn Yancy. Bolter was the original anchor along with Tracey Neale when WTTG launched Fox 5 News at 5. He launched the Fox 5 Newsedge at 11 as a solo anchor in July 2006. In September 2007, he launched the Fox 5 Newsedge at 6 as a solo anchor. Bolter finally anchored two hours of news on The Newsedge at 6 and 11 pm and continued to co-anchor of Fox 5 News at 10. He had Lasik surgery done live during a newscast on Fox 5 News at 10.

Bolter has won two local Emmy Awards, one for the Mid-Atlantic's Best Live Reporter. He also has three regional Edward R. Murrow Awards including Best Newscast in 2007 and 2008.

In 2006, Washingtonian Magazine named Bolter one of Washington's Best Dressed. Bolter's voice also appeared, uncredited, in a mock breaking news scene in the 2006 movie The Sentinel.

In 2013, he left WTTG to help expand the restaurant owned by him and his wife Lisa, the Red Red Wine Bar in Annapolis, Maryland.
