= Jungle Jim's International Market =

Supermarket in Ohio, United States

Coordinates: 39°20′09″N 84°31′28″W

- Current logo
- Industry: Grocery store
- Founded: 1971; 55 years ago in Hamilton, Ohio
- Founder: "Jungle" Jim Bonaminio
- Headquarters: Fairfield, Ohio, United States
- Number of locations: 2
- Area served: Cincinnati, Ohio
- Website: junglejims.com

Jungle Jim's International Market, formerly Jungle Jim's Farmer's Market, is a large specialty supermarket in Fairfield, Ohio, United States, with a satellite location in Union Township, Clermont County, both near Cincinnati. The main location is roughly 200,000 square feet (4.6 acres or 18,580 square meters), and has been described as a theme park of food. Jungle Jim's offers one of the largest wine selections in the United States, live seafood tanks, and an in-store cooking school. Each week, the store is visited by about 82,000 shoppers, whom founder "Jungle" Jim Bonaminio calls "foodies". Many of the specialty foods in international departments are difficult to find elsewhere in the Greater Cincinnati area, and customers have been known to drive from other cities for the store's wide variety of food. Jungle Jim’s is also known for its use of animatronics as well as other displays.

== History ==
In 1971, "Jungle" Jim Bonaminio set up a semi-permanent produce stand in a parking lot in Hamilton, Ohio. Over the next three years, Bonaminio moved the stand to several vacant lots throughout the area until he bought a plot of land. Due to the industrial zoning of the land, the city of Fairfield was reluctant to issue a permit for a commercial fruit and vegetable stand. After discussing an exception made for nearby fast food chain Arthur Treacher's, the city commission approved the permit. The first store opened in 1975 with 4,200 square feet of space.

Bonaminio continued to expand the store, adding products at customer request and enlarging and re-arranging the store. In 1988, after visiting specialty markets in Chicago, he decided to make the store an international market as well as introduce the jungle theme. Today, Jungle Jim’s is known for its wide variety of international foods such as various cheeses, exotic meats, breads and wines.

== Expansion ==
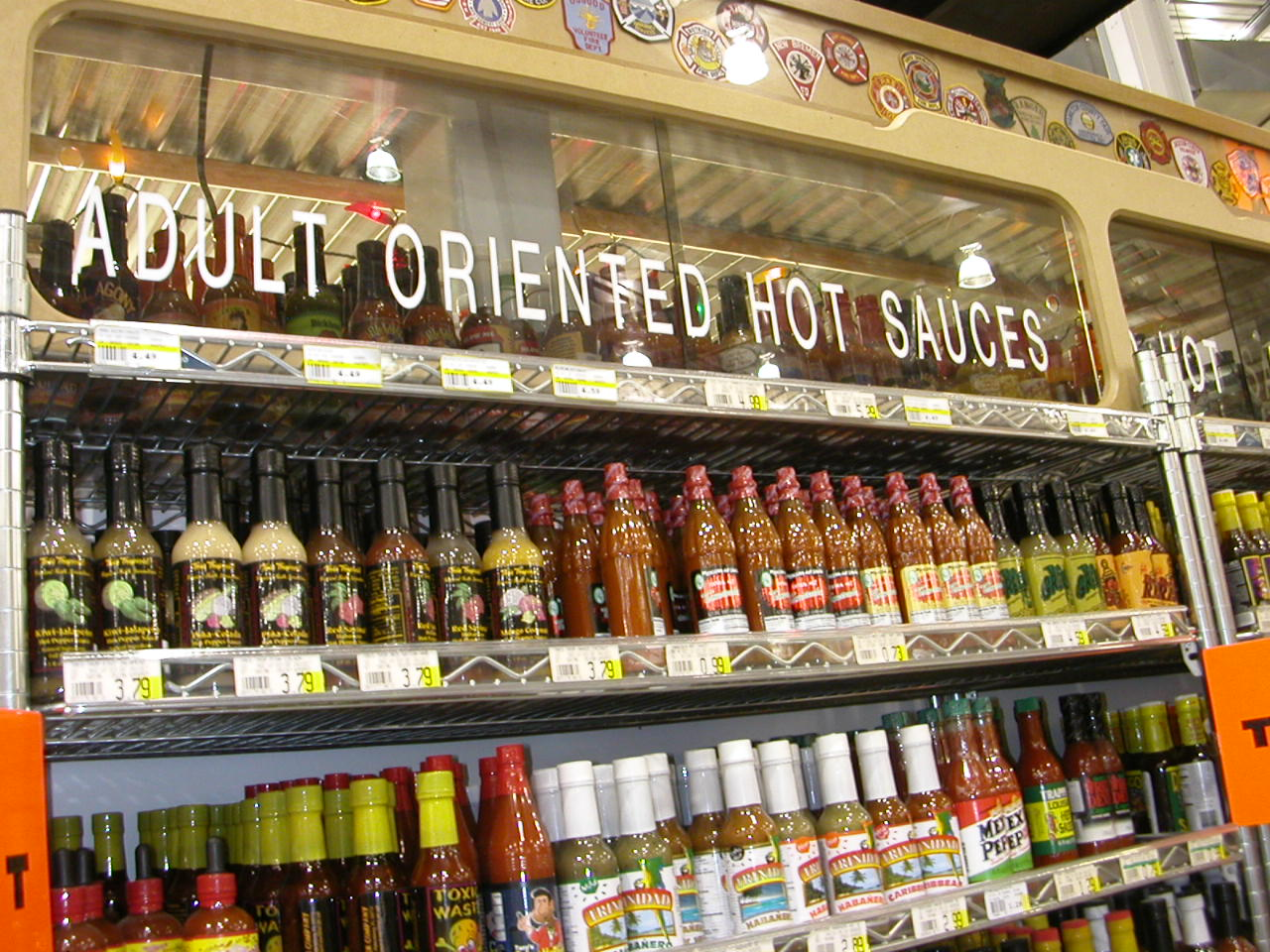
Adult Oriented Hot Sauces

Around 2004, Jungle Jim's added a strip mall on one side, including Hallmark and CiCi's Pizza. In 1998, the store purchased the former "Lion Country Safari" monorail trains from Kings Island. A large jungle-themed station featuring a giant snake façade was constructed behind the store and a second station was constructed at the Oscar Event Center to allow for guests to experience the monorail. Original plans called for the monorail to complete a circuit around the property, however, this has never been completed and unused supports still remain around the property. In 2019, the store opened "The Oscar Station", a bourbon bar experience housed within the monorail station. In January 2020, an expansion of the front end of the store was announced, adding 17,000 square feet to the store and space for tenants, including Graeter's ice cream.

On April 1, 2005, Bonaminio signed a letter of intent to open a second, smaller location closer to Cincinnati, but by April 2007, the project was canceled due to a lack of progress at the site. On September 25, 2012, Jungle Jim's opened a second location at the former bigg's Place Mall in Eastgate.

== The Oscar Event Center ==
The Oscar Event Center is a 34,100 sq. ft event space attached to Jungle Jim's International Market. Named after "Jungle" Jim's middle name, the event space opened in 2007. There are several venues within the event center: The Main Hall, The Lounge, The Outdoor Terrace, The Pub. The event space hosts several yearly events, including the International Craft Beer Festival, Weekend of Fire, International Wine Festival, Barrel-Aged Beer Bash, New Year New You, Big Cheese Festival, and Whiskey Night.

Jungle Jim's has been featured on the Food Network show Unwrapped, the History Channel show Modern Marvels, and ABC News' Good Morning America.

== See also ==
- Stew Leonard's
