= Fairfield Township, Butler County, Ohio =

Township in Ohio, US

Coordinates: 39°21′04″N 84°24′54″W

- Township
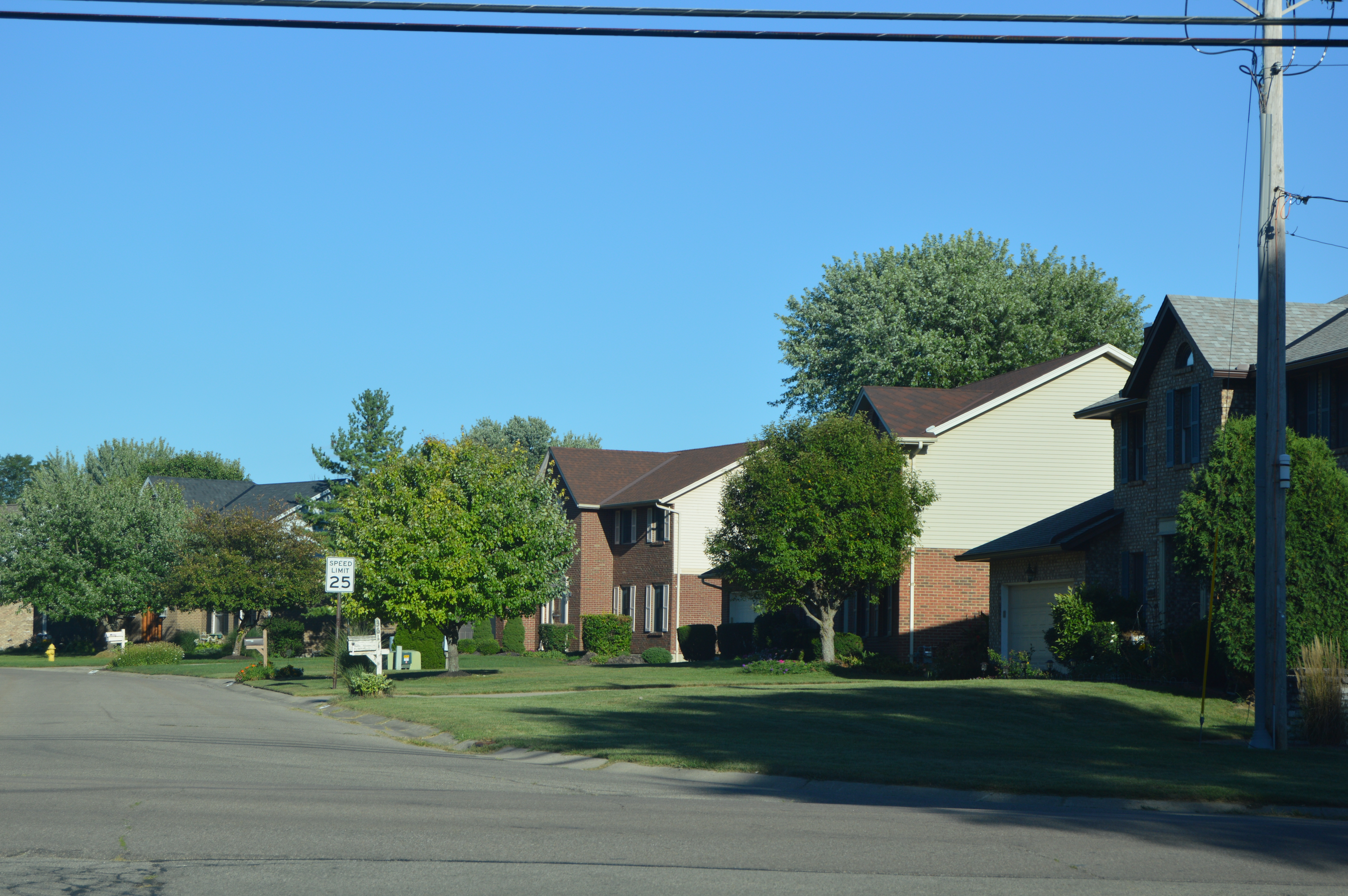
- Saratoga Drive, a typical suburban street in the township.

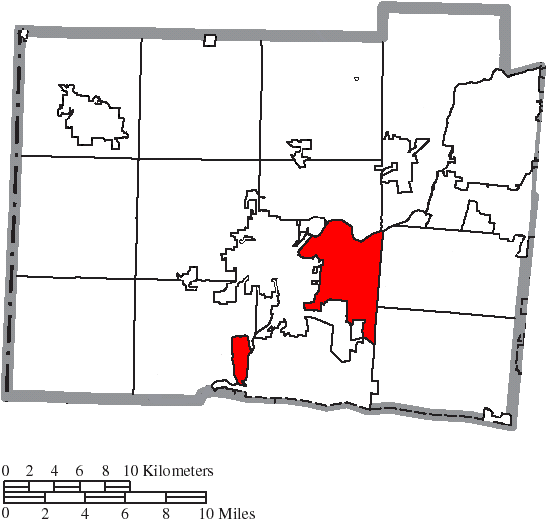
- Location of Fairfield Township in Butler County
- Country: United States
- State: Ohio
- County: Butler
- Established: 1795

Government
  - Type: Board of Trustees

Area
  - Total: 15.8 sq mi (41 km^{2})
- Elevation: 2,369 ft (722 m)

Population (2020)
  - Total: 22,645
- Time zone: UTC-5 (Eastern (EST))
  - Summer (DST): UTC-4 (EDT)
- GNIS feature ID: 1085808
- Website: http://www.fairfieldtwp.org/

Fairfield Township is one of thirteen townships in Butler County, Ohio, United States. It is located in the south central portion of the county. The population was 22,645 at the 2020 census. Before annexations by the cities of Hamilton and Fairfield, Ohio, it had an area of about 50 square miles (130 km^{2}).

== Name ==
Fairfield Township's name is reflective of the gentle topography in the township. It is one of seven Fairfield Townships statewide.

== History ==
In 1795, upon the signing of the Treaty of Greenville, the court of general quarter sessions of the peace for Hamilton County created Springfield and Fairfield townships out of the northern reaches of Cincinnati Township. Fairfield Township became part of a newly formed Butler County in 1802.

For a brief period in 1994 and 1995, the township was incorporated as the City of Indian Springs under a special law enacted by the Ohio General Assembly, but it reverted to township status when this law was declared unconstitutional by the courts.

== Geography ==
Located in the southern part of the county, it borders the following townships, cities, and villages:

- St. Clair Township - north, across the Great Miami River
- Madison Township - northeast
- Liberty Township - east, north of West Chester Township
- West Chester Township - east, south of Liberty Township
- Fairfield - south
- Ross Township - southwest
- Hamilton - west
- New Miami - northwest

Because the course of the Great Miami River has changed since its borders were fixed, some of the township is now west of the river. The lowest point in Butler County, elevation 520 feet (160 m), is in the township, where the Great Miami River crosses the county line, the township's southern boundary.

== Government ==
The township is governed by a three-member board of trustees, who are elected in November of odd-numbered years to a four-year term beginning on the following January 1. Two are elected in the year after the presidential election and one is elected in the year before it. There is also an elected township fiscal officer, who serves a four-year term beginning on April 1 of the year after the election, which is held in November of the year before the presidential election. Vacancies in the fiscal officership or on the board of trustees are filled by the remaining trustees.

Fairfield Township was one of the first four townships in Ohio to vote on whether to adopt limited home rule, in November 1991. The referendum passed, and Fairfield Township became a limited home rule township on January 1, 1992.

Because of proposed annexations by the city of Hamilton, state representative Michael A. Fox on September 29, 1994, secured special legislation that allowed the township to incorporate as a city under the name Indian Springs. On December 29, 1994, this law took effect and the new city was born. (Also on that date, the city of Fairfield was withdrawn from the township.) However, the courts struck down the law on December 20, 1996, and Indian Springs reverted once more to Fairfield Township, but the City of Fairfield remained outside the township.

== Transportation ==
The Miami and Erie Canal once ran through the township between Cincinnati and Hamilton. The Cincinnati, Hamilton and Dayton Railroad, now part of CSX Transportation, has its mainline through the township. Major highways include State Route 4 (the main road between Hamilton and Middletown) and the Butler County Regional Highway (aka State Route 129). U.S. Route 127, leading south to Cincinnati, passes through Hamilton west of the township.
