= Deer Park Community City School District =

School district in Ohio

Address
- 8688 Donna Lane Cincinnati, Ohio, 45236; United States

District information
- Type: Public
- Grades: PreK–12
- NCES District ID: 3904385

Students and staff
- Students: 1,198
- Teachers: 133.01 (FTE)
- Staff: 228.28 (FTE)
- Student–teacher ratio: 9.01

Other information
- Website: www.deerparkcityschools.org

The Deer Park Community City School District is a school district located in Hamilton County, Ohio, United States, comprising the entire City of Deer Park, Ohio, a portion of Sycamore Township, and a small portion of the City of Silverton, Ohio.

The district's schools are the Deer Park Junior/Senior High School, Holmes Elementary School, and Amity Elementary School. A fourth school building, the Howard Elementary School, is currently the home of the Deer Park Board of Education.

Beginning in 1826 in a one-room school house, current enrollment in the Deer Park City Schools is approximately 1,500 students.
