= Deer Park Junior/Senior High School =

Location
- 8351 Plainfield Road; Cincinnati, (Hamilton County), Ohio 45236; United States; 39°12′38″N 84°23′59″W

Information
- Type: Public high school
- Motto: Help your school help others help yourself
- Established: 1826
- Founder: Daniel Shank
- School district: Deer Park Community City Schools District
- Superintendent: Jay Phillips
- Principal: John Vander Meer
- Staff: 42.09 (FTE)
- Grades: 7–12
- Average class size: 21
- Student to teacher ratio: 11.97
- Colors: Scarlet and Gray
- Song: Alma Mater
- Fight song: Onward Deer Park
- Athletics conference: Cincinnati Hills League
- Sports: Baseball, Basketball, Bowling, Cheer, Chess, Cross Country, Football, Soccer, Softball, Tennis, Track, Volleyball, Wrestling
- Mascot: Wildcats
- Team name: Wildcats
- Rival: Reading High School
- Accreditation: North Central Association of Colleges and Schools
- Newspaper: Deer Park Today
- Alumni: Bill Cunningham, an American talk radio host for 700 WLW
- Website: jrsr.deerparkcityschools.org

Deer Park Junior/Senior High School (DPHS) is a public high school located in Hamilton County, Ohio, United States, in the city of Deer Park. It is the only high school in the Deer Park Community City Schools district.

Deer Park High School serves students in seventh through twelfth grades from the neighborhood of Deer Park and portions of Sycamore Township and the village of Silverton.

== Athletics ==
The school's athletic program competes as a member of the Ohio High School Athletic Association. The Wildcats are a member of the Cincinnati Hills League.

=== Ohio High School Athletic Association State Championships ===
- Boys Baseball – 1977
- Boys Basketball – 2018

== Notable alumni ==
- Bill Cunningham (class of 1966): talk radio host on WLW and Premiere Radio Networks; former Assistant Attorney General of Ohio; current defense attorney
