= Rossmoyne, Ohio =

- Census-designated place
- Location in Hamilton County and the state of Ohio
- Coordinates: 39°12′55″N 84°23′20″W
- Country: United States
- State: Ohio
- County: Hamilton

Area
  - Total: 0.54 sq mi (1.40 km^{2})
  - Land: 0.54 sq mi (1.40 km^{2})
  - Water: 0 sq mi (0.00 km^{2})
- Elevation: 830 ft (250 m)

Population (2020)
  - Total: 1,788
  - Density: 3,318.3/sq mi (1,281.21/km^{2})
- Time zone: UTC-5 (Eastern (EST))
  - Summer (DST): UTC-4 (EDT)
- ZIP code: 45236
- FIPS code: 39-68714
- GNIS feature ID: 2585524

Rossmoyne is a census-designated place (CDP) in Sycamore Township, Hamilton County, Ohio, United States, 13 miles (21 km) northeast of downtown Cincinnati. The population of Rossmoyne was 1,788 at the 2020 census.

== History ==
Rossmoyne was originally known as Mill Dale in the 19th century.

== Geography ==
Rossmoyne is bordered by Deer Park to the south, Dillonvale to the west, Blue Ash to the north, and Kenwood to the east.

According to the United States Census Bureau, the CDP has a total area of 0.58 square miles (1.5 km^{2}), all land.

== Demographics ==
Historical population
Census	Pop.	Note	%±
2020	1,788		—
U.S. Decennial Census

As of the census of 2020, there were 1,788 people living in the CDP, for a population density of 3,317.25 people per square mile (1,281.21/km^{2}). There were 832 housing units. The racial makeup of the CDP was 78.2% White, 9.3% Black or African American, 0.4% Native American, 2.2% Asian, 0.6% Pacific Islander, 2.0% from some other race, and 7.2% from two or more races. 4.3% of the population were Hispanic or Latino of any race.

There were 677 households, out of which 17.9% had children under the age of 18 living with them, 31.0% were married couples living together, 26.7% had a male householder with no spouse present, and 30.6% had a female householder with no spouse present. 41.2% of all households were made up of individuals, and 16.1% were someone living alone who was 65 years of age or older. The average household size was 2.12, and the average family size was 2.97.

15.2% of the CDP's population were under the age of 18, 62.6% were 18 to 64, and 22.2% were 65 years of age or older. The median age was 41.9. For every 100 females, there were 92.2 males.

According to the U.S. Census American Community Survey, for the period 2016-2020 the estimated median annual income for a household in the CDP was $44,078, and the median income for a family was $85,156. About 10.4% of the population were living below the poverty line, including 16.4% of those under age 18 and 0.9% of those age 65 or over. About 71.1% of the population were employed, and 23.7% had a bachelor's degree or higher.

== Notable people ==
- Clara Ann Thompson (1869-1949), poet, teacher, and civil rights advocate
