= The Kenwood Collection =

Shopping center in Kenwood, Ohio, USA

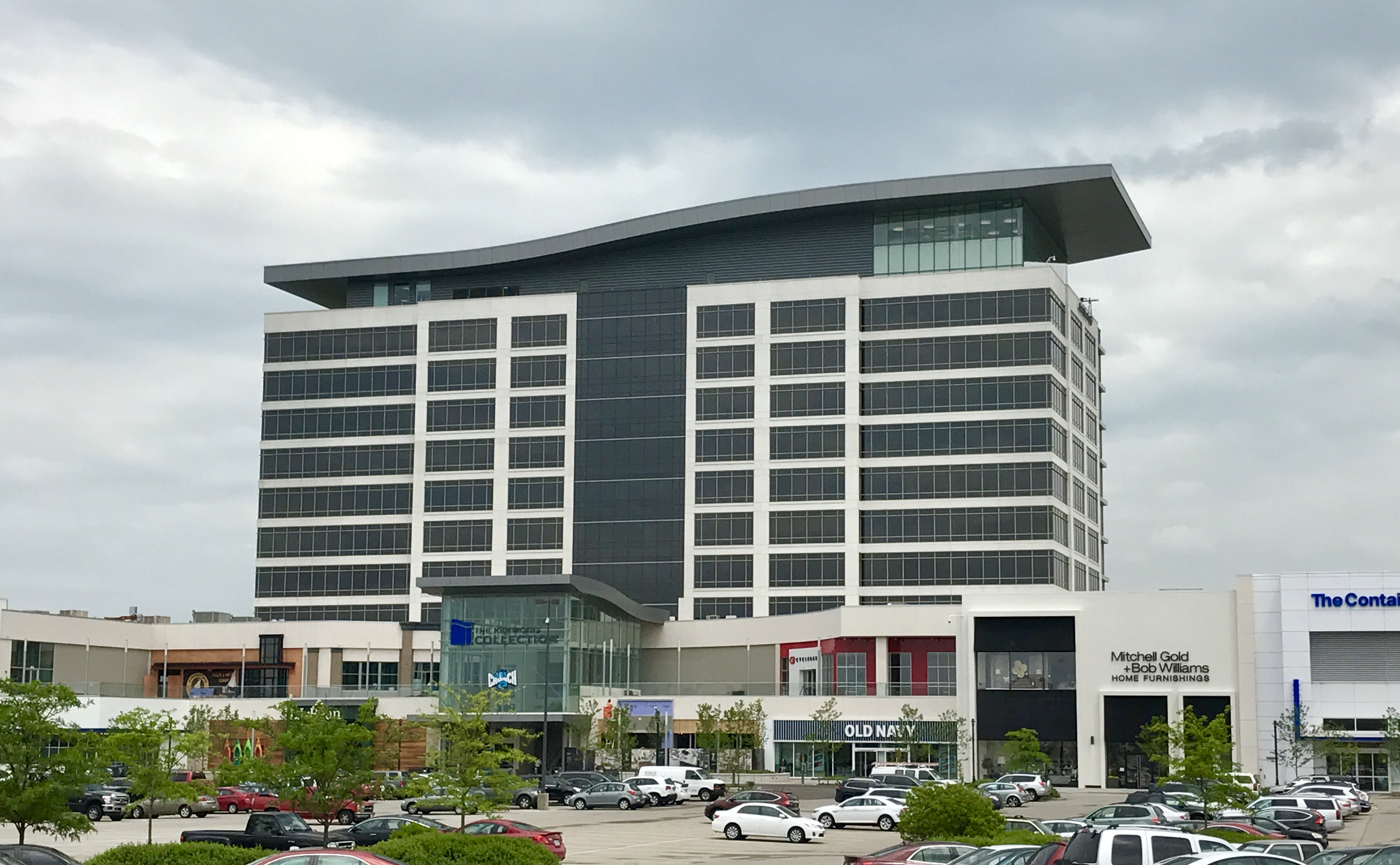
- Kenwood Towne Place in 2017
- Location: Kenwood, Ohio
- Coordinates: 39.204731°N 84.373843°W
- Manager: Jeffrey R. Anderson Real Estate
- Owner: Phillips Edison
- Floor area: 336,885
- Floors: 8
- Public transit: Metro
- Website: thekenwoodcollection.com

The Kenwood Collection, formerly Kenwood Town Place, is a shopping center in Kenwood, Ohio, United States, between Interstate 71 and Kenwood Towne Centre.

== History ==
Kenwood Towne Place was a $175 million development project funded by Bear Creek Capital, Neyer Holding Corporation and Dov Limited. Groundbreaking for Kenwood Towne Place happened on April 4, 2007. Kenwood Towne Place also includes a $33 million public parking garage funded by bonds underwritten by the Port of Greater Cincinnati Development Authority.

The original anchor tenants were supposed to be The Container Store, Crate & Barrel, Ethan Allen, Kroger, and LA Fitness. In March 2008, it was announced that Borders Books was set to occupy a 28,000-square-foot (2,600 m^{2}) space, in order to open "one of their new prototype stores" with a "higher-end bookstore experience."

In March 2008, UBS Financial Services Inc. signed a deal to lease 32,000 square feet (3,000 m^{2}) of the office space on the top floor.

Kroger opened a Fresh Fare store in 2008; The Container Store and Crate & Barrel both opened later that year. In 2009, Mitchell's Salon & Day Spa opened.

Bank of America bought the Kenwood Town Place property at a Hamilton County Sheriff's auction in July 2012 for $27.5 million; they then sold it to the developer Phillips Edison. In 2013, Phillips Edison changed the name of the property to the "Kenwood Collection".

== Financial trouble ==
At the end of December 2008 and the start of January 2009, several contractors filed almost $5 million in liens against Bear Creek Capital's Kenwood Towne Place.

In late January 2009, problems with the development project began to surface, as more than two dozen liens were filed that had a combined total value of $17 million over a two-week period. While the liens were being placed, the complex was partially under construction and partially occupied by several stores, leaving them in a state of limbo.

The lenders stopped making disbursements on all parts of the project until all of the liens had been cleared up; in February 2009, there were over 80 outstanding liens.

On February 13, 2009, the first subcontractor filed a lawsuit for $373,000 against Kenwood Towne Place LLC and Bear Creek Construction LLC. The lawsuit includes claims for breach of contract and unjust enrichment.

Cincinnati Councilman Chris Bortz proposed and supported a bailout of $1.8 million to assist some of the small businesses that are stuck in the current financial problems of the developer.

Bank of America filed a foreclosure lawsuit in the Hamilton County Common Pleas Court against Bear Creek Capital and the developers of Kenwood Towne Place in May 2009. Bank of America was seeking repayment of $81.3 million in loans and a sheriff's sale of the location. LA Fitness became the first tenant to sue the developers for $600,000 in unpaid construction costs.

Kenwood Towne Place was placed into receivership on June 9, 2009. The receiver was a developer out of Cleveland

== Criminal investigation ==
One of the subcontractors of the development project, Kraft Electrical Contracting, reported that he had spoken with both the FBI and Hamilton County Sheriff.

The FBI has taken over the Criminal Investigation was first opened by the Hamilton County Sheriff Department. The FBI has started to question people who worked on the project.

On Nov. 16, 2012 Matt Daniels was indicted on 25 conspiracy and fraud counts. It was alleged that he used the money for personal gain.

Former Bear Creek CFO's Tina Schmidt pleaded guilty to one count of conspiracy to commit bank fraud in connection to the Kenwood Towne Place development. In her plea agreement she claimed she "knowingly and intentionally worked with other people – including individuals identified herein by the initials M.D. and A.T. – to executive a scheme to defraud federally-insured financial institutions – namely Bank of America and its predecessor entity, LaSalle Bank."

On December 20, 2013, former Kenwood Towne Place developer Matt Daniels was found not guilty on all charges. Daniels had faced 23 counts of fraud in relation to the failed project. The two other charges he faced, from the 25 counts he was indicted on, were dismissed.

== Civil litigation ==
The judge in the foreclosure action recused himself after speaking with Ohio Supreme Court; he had found that he held stock in one of the creditors, Fifth Third Bank. Judge Steven Martin was replaced by Judge Beth Myers.

The case, which has become one of the largest cases in Hamilton County Court of Common Pleas, got even more complicated. On October 2, 2009, motions were filed which alleged "large-scale fraud" by Bear Creek Capital. The same motion also alleged that Bear Creek Capital and Bank of America had engaged in improper relationships. Judge Beth Myers denied a motion of receiver Hank Menniinger requesting to resign after he had been unable to secure loans to address health and safety issues. Judge Myers ordered that Bank of America fund $263,000 in repairs. However, another hearing was held on December 21, 2009. Judge Myers allowed Attorney Hank Menninger to step down as receiver for the project, and appointed Frank Hertge, who was nominated by Bank of America. Bank of America has dropped its challenge of the receivership of Kenwood Towne Center attorney Hank Menninger. Hamilton County Judge Beth Myers ordered that the receiver be paid 80% of money due for the daily management of operating the buildings.

Gregory Scheper, Bear Creek's director of acquisition, filed a lawsuit against Bear Creek for $1.8 million. The cause for actions in the suit are racketeering, conspiracy, and fraud.

News was broken that the mediation that was underway in October 2010 failed, and the matter is moving forward to trial in February 2011. This case is set to be the largest and longest trial in the history of Hamilton County, Ohio.

In July 2013 news reported that there was a $5 million conclusion to the litigation. Investor Tim Baird entered into a consent decree judgement.

== Recent problems ==
After Bear Creek Capital ran out of money, work stopped on finishing the project while the remaining stores struggled to stay open.

In March 2009 Sycamore Township Fire Chief William Jetter threatened to revoke the site's occupancy certificate if a list of violations were not fixed, including problems with the sprinkler and fire alarm system not working.

Hamilton County Building Commissioner Tonia Edwards issued an order, which highlighted eight items that needed to be fixed in order for the temporary occupancy certificate to remain in effect.

Vicki Lang, Manager of public relation for Crate & Barrel Stated: "We are collaborating with our fellow Kenwood Towne Place retailers to work through this challenging situation. We want to assure Crate & Barrel customers that we remain committed to serving them at this location. We invite shoppers to come and see for themselves – Crate & Barrel is alive and well at Kenwood Towne Place!"

Kroger closed its store in Kenwood Towne Place on May 30, 2010. Kroger stated this is the first time that it had to close a new store.

Adding to the ongoing trouble for this development is the fact that the Current Fire Chief has declared that without work, the site is becoming a bigger fire hazard every day. The Fire Chief has stated that the building and other items on the site which could cause problems for the public.

=== Use of License Plate Readers ===
Brookfield Properties, according to them, uses Vigilant Technologies License Plate Reader technology "for the purposes of enforcing our Parking Program and for Crime Prevention and Law Enforcement Investigations. LPR data is NOT used by the mall or third parties for marketing solicitations or target marketing." As part of the parking program they say that it is help find "non-customers and their vehicles, examples include commuters, nearby office building workers, students at nearby schools." The data collected by the readers included "license plate number, a photograph of the license plate (which may include parts of vehicle surrounding the license plate), the GPS location of the vehicle, and the time of date of the read. This same information can be observed by any person walking through the parking lot."

The Electronic Frontier Foundation released a report talking about how some shopping centers are spying for an ICE contractor. The contractor Vigilant Solution issued a press release disputing the EFF report claiming that the report from the EFF was false.

== Stores/Places ==
- Crunch Fitness
- Whole Foods
- Crate & Barrel opened in 2008
- The Container Store opened in 2008
- Old Navy
- L.L. Bean
- Ethan Allen
- Gyu-Kaku Japanese BBQ
- Mitchell Gold + Bob Williams
- CycleBar - CLOSED
- Mitchell's Salon and Day Spa opened in 2009
- Texas de Brazil
- Olio Italian
- Matt The Miller's Tavern
- The Kenwood Theater

== Former Stores/Places ==
- LA Fitness opened in 2009 and closed in 2012/13
- Kroger opened in 2008 and closed in May 2010
- Z Gallerie opened in 2017/18 and closed in 2019
- Envision Cinemas
