= Concorde Hills, Ohio =

- Census-designated place
- Location in Hamilton County and the state of Ohio.
- Coordinates: 39°12′39″N 84°21′26″W
- Country: United States
- State: Ohio
- County: Hamilton

Area
  - Total: 0.35 sq mi (0.91 km^{2})
  - Land: 0.35 sq mi (0.91 km^{2})
  - Water: 0 sq mi (0.00 km^{2})
- Elevation: 794 ft (242 m)

Population (2020)
  - Total: 644
  - Density: 1,830.6/sq mi (706.81/km^{2})
- Time zone: UTC-5 (Eastern (EST))
  - Summer (DST): UTC-4 (EDT)
- FIPS code: 39-18244
- GNIS feature ID: 2585504

Concorde Hills is a census-designated place (CDP) in Sycamore Township, Hamilton County, Ohio, United States. The population was 644 at the 2020 census.

== Geography ==
Concorde Hills is located just east of Kenwood and 14 miles (23 km) northeast of Cincinnati. It is bordered by The Village of Indian Hill to the east and the city of Madeira to the south.

According to the United States Census Bureau, the CDP has a total area of 0.39 square miles (1.0 km^{2}), all land.

== Demographics ==
As of the census of 2020, there were 644 people living in the CDP, for a population density of 1,829.55 people per square mile (706.81/km^{2}). There were 222 housing units. The racial makeup of the CDP was 79.0% White, 3.9% Black or African American, 0.0% Native American, 9.0% Asian, 0.0% Pacific Islander, 1.1% from some other race, and 7.0% from two or more races. 5.3% of the population were Hispanic or Latino of any race.

There were 169 households, out of which 57.4% had children under the age of 18 living with them, 68.0% were married couples living together, 5.3% had a male householder with no spouse present, and 26.6% had a female householder with no spouse present. 24.9% of all households were made up of individuals, and 24.9% were someone living alone who was 65 years of age or older. The average household size was 2.75, and the average family size was 3.33.

31.7% of the CDP's population were under the age of 18, 39.5% were 18 to 64, and 23.4% were 65 years of age or older. The median age was 36.2. For every 100 females, there were 98.8 males.

According to the U.S. Census American Community Survey, for the period 2016-2020 the estimated median annual income for a household in the CDP was $250,000. About 3.2% of the population were living below the poverty line, including 0.0% of those under age 18 and 15.3% of those age 65 or over. About 57.1% of the population were employed, and 80.1% had a bachelor's degree or higher.
