= Brecon, Ohio =

- Census-designated place
- Location in Hamilton County and the state of Ohio.
- Coordinates: 39°16′47″N 84°21′12″W
- Country: United States
- State: Ohio
- County: Hamilton

Area
  - Total: 0.66 sq mi (1.70 km^{2})
  - Land: 0.66 sq mi (1.70 km^{2})
  - Water: 0 sq mi (0.00 km^{2})
- Elevation: 869 ft (265 m)

Population (2020)
  - Total: 408
  - Density: 620.3/sq mi (239.48/km^{2})
- Time zone: UTC-5 (Eastern (EST))
  - Summer (DST): UTC-4 (EDT)
- FIPS code: 39-08378
- GNIS feature ID: 2585501

Brecon is a census-designated place (CDP) in Sycamore Township, Hamilton County, Ohio, United States. The population was 408 at the 2020 census.

== History ==
Brecon was a depot on the Cincinnati, Lebanon and Northern Railway. In 1894, it was described as a village of 50 inhabitants with a store, school and church.

== Geography ==
Brecon is located along East Kemper Road, 18 miles (29 km) northeast of downtown Cincinnati and just north of the interchange between Interstate 71 and Interstate 275. The community is bordered by the CDP of Highpoint to the north, unincorporated Sycamore Township to the east, the city of Montgomery to the south, the city of Blue Ash to the southwest, and the city of Sharonville to the northwest.

According to the United States Census Bureau, the CDP has a total area of 0.54 square miles (1.4 km^{2}), all land.

== Demographics ==
Historical population
Census	Pop.	Note	%±
2020	408		—
U.S. Decennial Census

As of the census of 2020, there were 408 people living in the CDP, for a population density of 239.48 people per square mile (125.95/km^{2}). There were 138 housing units. The racial makeup of the CDP was 26.7% White, 1.2% Black or African American, 0.2% Native American, 0.0% Asian, 0.0% Pacific Islander, 57.8% from some other race, and 11.5% from two or more races. 74.5% of the population were Hispanic or Latino of any race.

There were 333 households, out of which 31.8% had children under the age of 18 living with them, 43.2% were married couples living together, 0.0% had a male householder with no spouse present, and 52.9% had a female householder with no spouse present. 52.9% of all households were made up of individuals, and 52.9% were someone living alone who was 65 years of age or older. The average household size was 2.57, and the average family size was 4.24.

32.5% of the CDP's population were under the age of 18, 44.7% were 18 to 64, and 22.8% were 65 years of age or older. The median age was 35.3. For every 100 females, there were 99.8 males.

According to the U.S. Census American Community Survey, for the period 2016-2020 the estimated median annual income for a household in the CDP was $63,588, and the median income for a family was $65,720. About 37.5% of the population were living below the poverty line, including 51.4% of those under age 18 and 0.0% of those age 65 or over. About 44.7% of the population were employed, and 62.2% had a bachelor's degree or higher.
