= Ed Biles =

American football player and coach (1931–2020)

Biographical details
- Born: October 18, 1931; Reading, Ohio, U.S.
- Died: April 5, 2020 (aged 88); Houston, Texas, U.S.
- Education: Miami (OH)

Coaching career (HC unless noted)
- 1953: Woodward HS (OH) (assistant)
- 1954–1956: Woodward HS (OH)
- 1956–1961: Xavier (freshman HC)
- 1962–1968: Xavier
- 1969–1970: New Orleans Saints (assistant)
- 1971–1973: New York Jets (scout/DB)
- 1974–1980: Houston Oilers (DB/DC)
- 1981–1983: Houston Oilers
- 2005: Cincinnati Marshalls
- 2006: Texas Copperheads (assistant)

Head coaching record
- Overall: 39–28–3 (college); 9–22 (NFL)

Edward G. Biles (October 18, 1931 – April 5, 2020) was an American football coach whose most prominent position was as head coach of the National Football League's Houston Oilers from 1981 to 1983.

A native of Reading, Ohio, Biles was an outstanding high school athlete, earning 12 letters and helping the 1946 Reading High School team capture the state baseball championship. He then attended Miami University and was on the school's football team until suffering a career-ending injury. In his remaining time as an undergraduate, Biles served as an assistant with the squad, then officially began his coaching tenure at the high school level.

== High school coaching ==
In 1953, he served as an assistant coach at Woodward High School in Cincinnati, while also finishing work on his master's degree. The next year, he was elevated to head coach at the school, before accepting the position of freshman football coach at Cincinnati's Xavier University. Biles would remain in that position for the next six years, with a record of 20–4 until he was promoted to head coach of the varsity on November 24, 1961, following the departure of Edward Doherty.

== Coaching career ==
After two seasons in which he compiled an 11–8–1 record, Biles was offered a defensive assistant's role with the University of Notre Dame under head coach Ara Parseghian, who had been at the helm during Biles career at Miami. However, Biles turned the offer down on January 4, 1964, citing his desire to remain as a head coach. He remained at the school for another five seasons, having his best success with the 1965 unit that finished 8–2, and compiled an overall record of 39–28–3.

On January 27, 1969, Biles resigned his position at Xavier to become an assistant coach with the NFL's New Orleans Saints. Working for two seasons under head coach Tom Fears, Biles lost his job soon after Fears was dismissed in November 1970, but found work as a scout for the New York Jets the following year.

After one season in that capacity, Biles was selected as the Jets' defensive backs coach on June 24, 1972. He spent the next two seasons under the leadership of head coach Weeb Ewbank, but when he retired following the 1973 NFL season, Biles again lost his job.

=== Houston Oilers ===
With his Miami University pedigree, he was able to obtain a coaching position in 1974 with the Oilers under former Miami coach Sid Gillman. When Gillman retired at the end of that season, he promoted Bum Phillips to head coach, with Biles becoming the team's defensive coordinator. Over the next six seasons, the team showed constant improvement, reaching the AFC Championship Game in both 1978 and 1979.

==== Head coach ====
In 1980, the Houston Oilers reached the playoffs, but three days after an embarrassing loss to the Oakland Raiders in the 1980 AFC wild card game, Phillips was fired by Oilers owner Bud Adams. On January 2, 1981, Biles was tabbed as the team's head coach.

Biles inherited an aging football team and was unable to maintain the winning ways, falling to 7–9 in 1981 before dropping to 1–8 in the strike-shortened 1982 NFL season. When the team lost its first six games the next year, a string that extended a losing streak to 13 games, Biles resigned on October 10, 1983, and was replaced by defensive coordinator Chuck Studley. Biles' frustration was evident at his final press conference when he said, "I've been a punching bag. I've been in the eye of the hurricane for two and a half years, the center of all controversies. I've felt like I've had enough."

== Later career ==
Biles never returned to the NFL, but remained in touch with the sport by serving as a color commentator for the Houston Gamblers of the USFL 1984–1985, Texas high school football 6A Playoffs and NCAA college football games in Texas. He was also inducted into both the Hamilton County (Ohio) and Xavier University Halls of Fame and Reading High School.

In 2005, he was hired as head coach of the Cincinnati Marshalls of the National Indoor Football League, but resigned on May 31 when additional duties were given due to the team's shaky financial condition.

In late 2006, Biles was hired as an assistant to the head coach of the Texas Copperheads of the af2, the minor league system of the Arena Football League.

== Death ==
Biles died on April 5, 2020, in Houston, Texas after suffering from leukemia. He was 88 years old.

== Head coaching record ==
=== College ===
Year	Team	Overall	Conference	Standing	Bowl/playoffs
Xavier Musketeers (NCAA University Division independent) (1962–1968)
1962	Xavier	6–4			
1963	Xavier	5–4–1			
1964	Xavier	4–5–1			
1965	Xavier	8–2			
1966	Xavier	4–6			
1967	Xavier	6–3–1			
1968	Xavier	6–4			
Xavier:		39–28–3			
Total:		39–28–3			

=== NFL ===
Team	Year	Regular Season					Postseason			
Team	Year	Won	Lost	Ties	Win %	Finish	Won	Lost	Win %	Result
HOI	1981	7	9	0	.438	3rd in AFC Central	–	–	–	–
HOI	1982	1	8	0	.111	13th in AFC	–	–	–	–
HOI	1983	0	6	0	.000	4th in AFC Central	–	–	–	–
HOI Total		8	23	0	.258		–	–	–	
Total		8	23	0	.258					
