= Meier's Wine Cellars =

Winery in Ohio, US

Coordinates: 39°11′44″N 84°24′04″W

Meier's Wine Cellars is a winery in Silverton, Ohio. The company began in 1895 as the John C. Meier Grape Juice Company, Inc. and bottled juice from grapes grown in what is now the Kenwood Towne Centre. Drawn by the presence of the Baltimore and Ohio Railroad, the company purchased land in Silverton and began making wine in addition to juice. The company became the largest winery in Ohio. In 1976 the winery was purchased by Paramount Distillers, which retained the Meier's name and kept members of the Meier family as consultants. In 1980 the company acquired Lonz Wines, a winery on Middle Bass Island, one of the last places in Ohio where grapes were still grown. Today the company continues producing 45 kinds of wine and grape juices.
