= WMKV =

Radio station in Reading, Ohio

Reading, Ohio; United States
- Broadcast area: Cincinnati
- Frequency: 89.3 MHz
- Branding: Flagship Station of the Maple Knoll Village network.

Programming
- Format: adult standards; big band; nostalgia

Ownership
- Owner: Maple Knoll Communities

History
- First air date: 1995
- Call sign meaning: Maple Knoll Village

Technical information
- Licensing authority: FCC
- Facility ID: 61575
- Class: A
- ERP: 410 watts
- HAAT: 72 meters (236 ft)
- Transmitter coordinates: 39°13′23.2″N 84°25′55.7″W
- Repeater: (89.9 MHz) WLHS (West Chester)

Links
- Public license information: Public file; LMS
- Webcast: Listen live
- Website: wmkvfm.org

WMKV (89.3 FM) is a radio station in Reading, Ohio, a suburb of Cincinnati. It is the first FM educational public radio station to be licensed to a retirement community. Operating from the campus of Maple Knoll Village, WMKV broadcasts talk programs, classic shows from the old-time radio era, and features musical standards and big band music. The station also carries the audio of WKRC-TV's morning and evening news. The station's transmitter has an effective radiated power of 410 watts.

Since July 2013, WMKV's programming has been also carried by Lakota Local School District's WLHS 89.9 FM.

== History ==
WMKV has been broadcasting since 1995. It aired a revival of Moon River from 1995 to 1999. In 1999, WMKV took over 89.3 FM after Reading High School shut down its high school radio station, WRCJ.

In November 2004, WMKV was the subject of a front-page Los Angeles Times profile. The writer, P.J. Huffstutter, had discovered the station while reporting on the 2004 American presidential election from Ohio.

== See also ==
- List of community radio stations in the United States
