= Dillonvale, Ohio =

Dillonvale is the name of two places in the U.S. state of Ohio:

- Dillonvale, Hamilton County, Ohio
- Dillonvale, Jefferson County, Ohio
