= Priscilla Jane Thompson =

American poet and public reader (1871–1942)

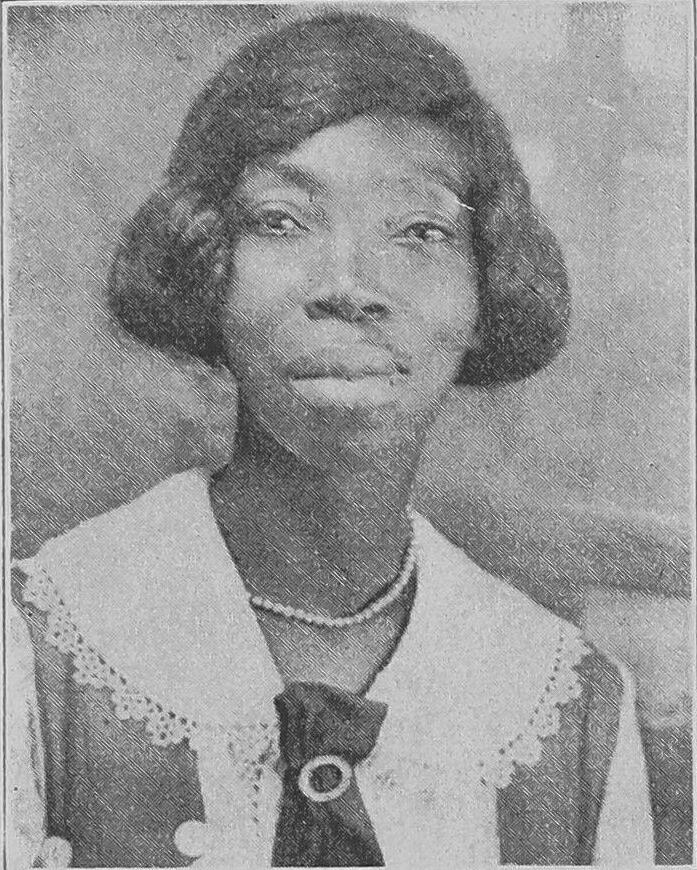
- Born: 1871; Rossmoyne
- Died: 1942
- Occupations: Poet, lecturer, Sunday school teacher
- Relatives: Clara Ann Thompson, Aaron Belford Thompson

Priscilla Jane Thompson (1871–1942), was an American poet and public reader. She has been widely anthologized as an example of early female African-American poetry.

Priscilla Jane Thompson was born in 1871 in Rossmoyne, Ohio. She was one of four children of John Henry Thompson and Clara Jane Gray, both former slaves from Virginia. She came from an artistic family: her siblings Clara Ann Thompson and Aaron Belford Thompson were also poets, and her brother Garland Yancey Thompson was a sculptor. Poor health prevented her from becoming a schoolteacher, but she wrote, lectured, and taught Sunday school. She never married, and lived with Clara and Garland in Rossmoyne her entire life.

Thompson self-published two books of poetry, Ethiope Lays (1900) and Gleanings of Quiet Hours (1907). Her poetry covers a variety of subjects, including religion, slavery and the African-American experience, and small-town life. Her love poems include both chivalric poems and love poems addressed to other women. She used African-American dialect in a number of poems, including the 72-stanza long “The Favorite Slave’s Story."

Thompson died on May 4, 1942. A profile of her was published in Wendell Phillips Dabney's 1926 book on the Cincinnati's Colored Citizens.
