= Brian O'Connor (pitcher) =

American baseball player (born 1977)

- Pitcher
- Born: January 4, 1977 (age 49); Cincinnati, Ohio, U.S.
- Batted: Left Threw: Left

MLB debut
- May 13, 2000, for the Pittsburgh Pirates

Last MLB appearance
- September 27, 2000, for the Pittsburgh Pirates

MLB statistics
- Win–loss record: 0–0
- Earned run average: 5.11
- Strikeouts: 7
- Stats at Baseball Reference

Teams
- Pittsburgh Pirates (2000)

Brian M. O'Connor (born January 4, 1977) is an American former Major League Baseball pitcher who played during one season at the major league level for the Pittsburgh Pirates. He was drafted by the Pirates in the 11th round of the 1995 amateur draft. O'Connor played his first professional season in 1995 with their Rookie league Gulf Coast Pirates and his last season with the Atlanta Braves' Triple-A Richmond Braves in 2006.

== High school career ==
O'Connor attended Reading High School in Reading, Ohio. In his senior season, his ERA was 0.80 and he recorded 110 strikeouts in 55 innings pitched. He was voted 1st team all-city in 1995. Honorable Mention All State by USA Today Sports.

== Professional career ==
Although his major league career was limited to just six games, O'Connor pitched twelve professional seasons. He ended his playing career with 70 wins and 932 strikeouts over 1,226 innings pitched, mostly accumulated in the minor leagues. He attended 6 Major league spring training camps. Was on the Pittsburgh Pirates 40 Man roster from 1999-2001. Was a member of the 1999 Arizona fall league champion Mesa Solar Sox. Pitched for the 1997 Carolina league champion Lynchburg Hillcats. Recorded the first win in Mississippi Braves history in 2005. Pitched for the 1997 Hilo Stars of the Hawaii winter baseball. He played for the following organizations: Pittsburgh Pirates (1995–2002), Tampa Bay Devil Rays (2003), Atlanta Braves (2005–2006) Signed with Cincinnati Reds for 2007 season.
