= Reading, Ohio =

- City
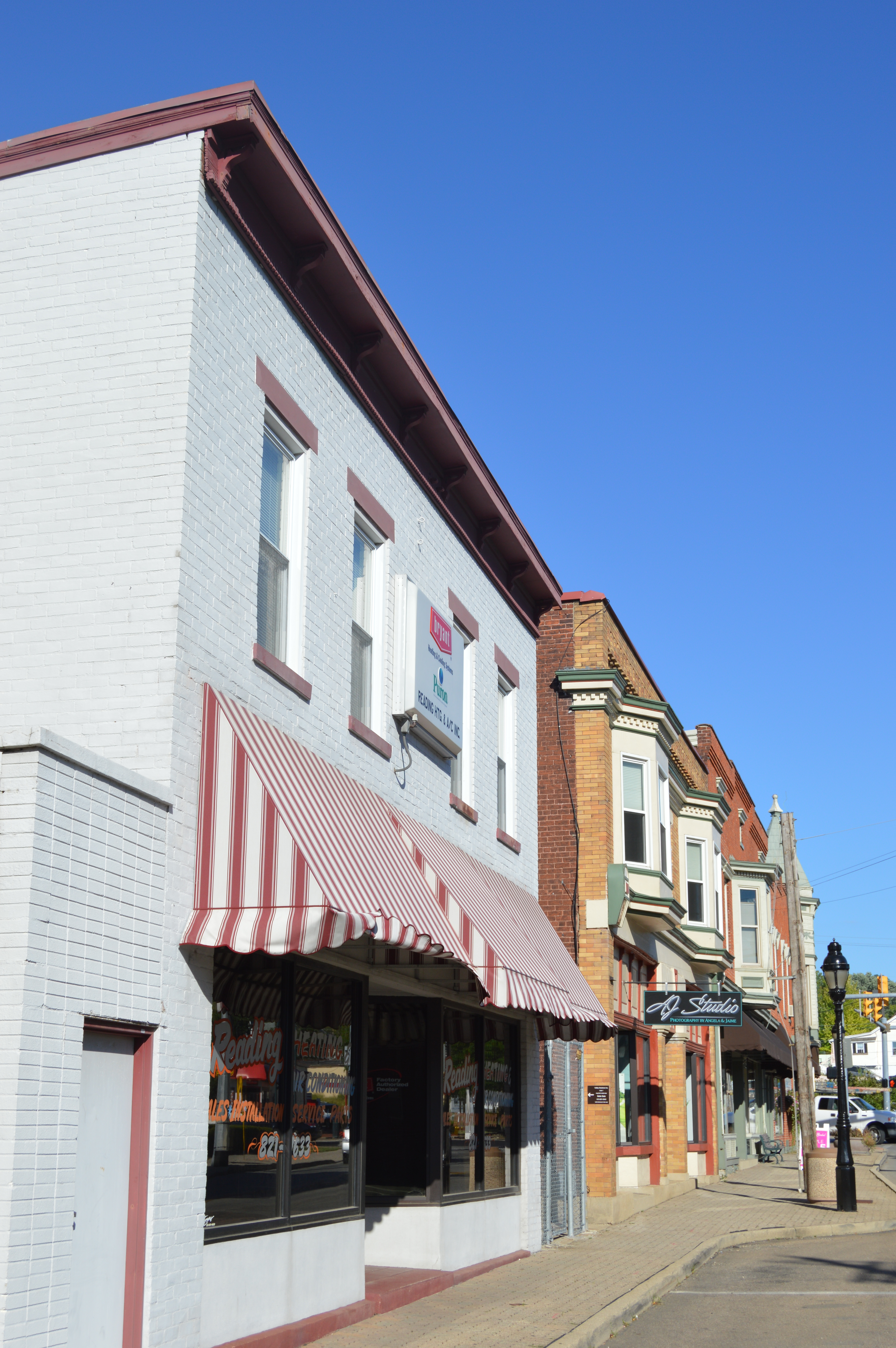
- Benson Street downtown
- Mottoes: "The Crossroads of Opportunity", Wir Tun Unser Bestes (German: "We Do Our Best")
- Interactive map of Reading, Ohio
- Location within Ohio Location within the United States
- Coordinates: 39°13′27″N 84°26′00″W
- Country: United States
- State: Ohio
- County: Hamilton
- Settled: 1797
- Incorporated: March 24, 1851
- Became a city: January 1, 1932
- Withdrew from Sycamore Township: May 19, 1943

Government
  - Mayor: Robert Bemmes (R)

Area
  - Total: 2.89 sq mi (7.48 km^{2})
  - Land: 2.89 sq mi (7.48 km^{2})
  - Water: 0 sq mi (0.00 km^{2})
- Elevation: 755 ft (230 m)

Population (2020)
  - Total: 10,600
  - Estimate (2022): 10,397
  - Density: 3,669.1/sq mi (1,416.64/km^{2})
- Time zone: UTC-5 (Eastern (EST))
  - Summer (DST): UTC-4 (EDT)
- ZIP codes: 45215, 45236, 45237
- Area code: 513
- FIPS code: 39-65732
- GNIS feature ID: 1086225
- Website: www.readingohio.org

Reading (/ˈrɛdɪŋ/ RED-ing) is a city in Hamilton County, Ohio, United States. The population was 10,600 at the 2020 census. It is an inner suburb of Cincinnati and is included as part of the Cincinnati metropolitan area.

== History ==
In 1794, Abraham Voorhees moved his family from Somerset County, New Jersey, building a large double log cabin along the west bank of the Millcreek in Sycamore Township, in present-day Lockland. In the spring of 1795, Harvey Redinbo, a Pennsylvania Dutchman, visited from Reading, Pennsylvania. Pleased with the land that Voorhees had acquired, Redinbo purchased his own land, in the area of Hunt Road and Columbia Avenue. Around 1798, Voorhees platted a town named Voorhees-Town but did not record it with county officials until January 7, 1804. By then, Redinbo had convinced him to rename the town to Reading, after Redinbo's hometown.

Between 1830 and 1880, Reading grew rapidly to become the largest village in Hamilton County. It was incorporated as a village on March 24, 1851. The village's major industry was clothing manufacturing.

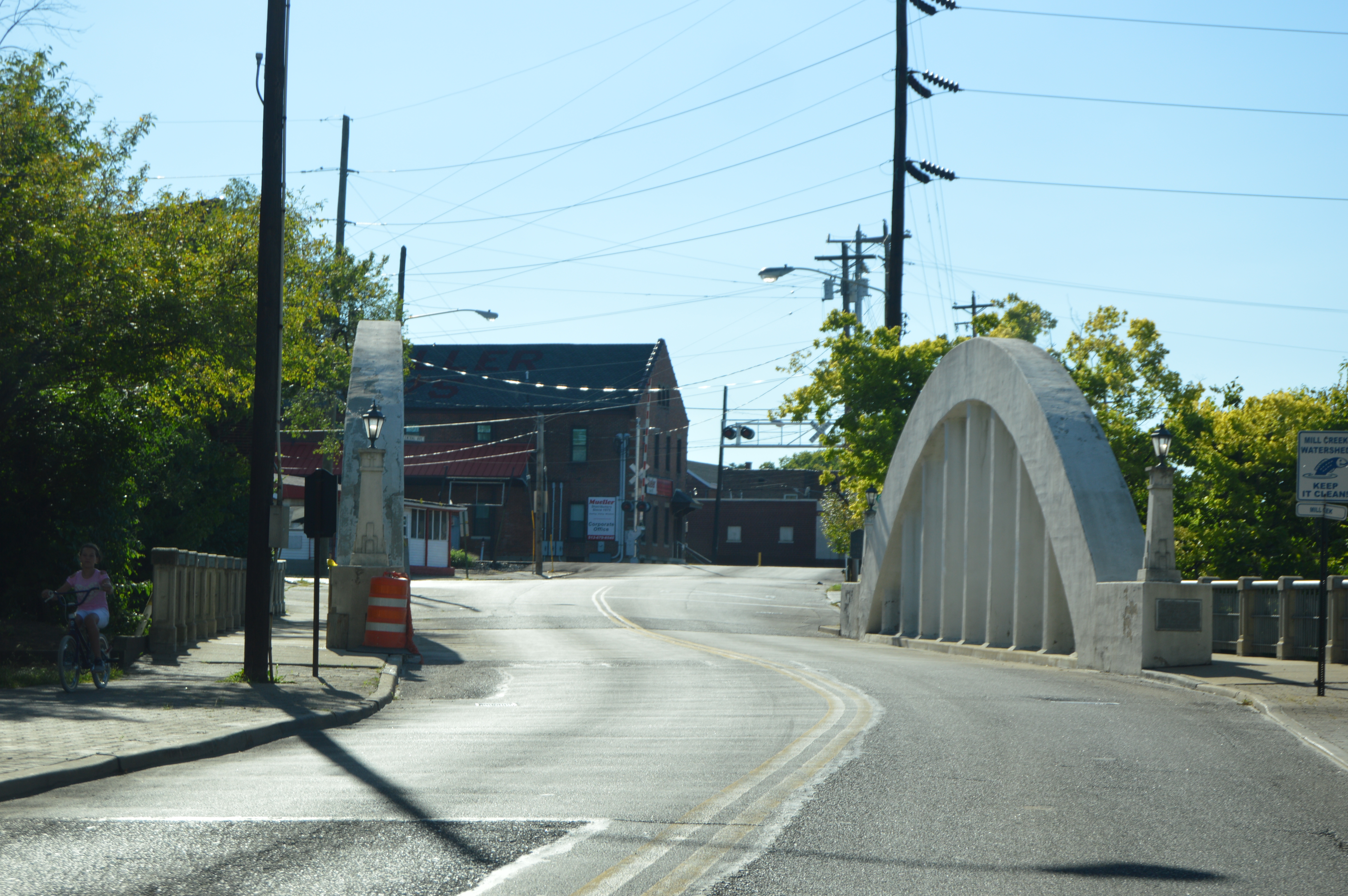
Benson Street Bridge

The Benson Street Bridge, built in 1901, spans Mill Creek on the city limit with Lockland. It was the second concrete rainbow arch bridge and the first in Ohio.

As of 1912, Reading was a sundown town. African Americans were prohibited from living within the city or remaining there after dark. Most censuses from 1860 through 1960 recorded no African Americans in Reading.

In 1903, the village council instituted a nightly curfew on youths under 16. A bell atop the town hall rang at the start of the curfew. In 1943, the curfew was revised to start later in the evening. By 1971, the law remained on the books but was no longer being enforced.

Reading became a city on January 1, 1932. It withdrew from Sycamore Township on May 19, 1943, forming a paper township named "Reading Township".

== Geography ==
Reading is located at 39°13′22″N 84°26′21″W (39.222709, -84.439036). According to the United States Census Bureau, the city has a total area of 2.89 square miles (7.49 km^{2}), all land.

Reading is bordered by Cincinnati's Roselawn neighborhood to the south, Amberley Village and Sycamore Township to the southeast, Blue Ash to the east, Evendale to the north, Lockland to the west, and Arlington Heights to the southwest. Mill Creek divides Reading from Lockland and Arlington Heights.

Reading can be reached by car via Interstate 75, Ohio State Route 126, or U.S. Route 42. The northbound lanes of Mill Creek Expressway run along the city's west side, with exits onto Galbraith Road and Koehler Avenue. Ronald Reagan Cross County Highway has a complex interchange with Interstate 75 at Reading. Reading lies along Norfolk Southern Railway's Dayton District and the Indiana and Ohio Railway's Oasis Subdivision.

== Demographics ==
Historical population
Census	Pop.	Note	%±
1860	1,230		—
1870	1,575		28.0%
1880	2,680		70.2%
1900	3,076		—
1910	3,985		29.6%
1920	4,540		13.9%
1930	5,723		26.1%
1940	6,079		6.2%
1950	7,836		28.9%
1960	12,832		63.8%
1970	14,617		13.9%
1980	12,843		−12.1%
1990	12,038		−6.3%
2000	11,292		−6.2%
2010	10,385		−8.0%
2020	10,600		2.1%
2022 (est.)	10,397		−1.9%

=== 2020 census ===
As of the 2020 census, Reading had a population of 10,600. The population density was 3,669.09 people per square mile (1,416.64/km^{2}). 100.0% of residents lived in urban areas, while 0.0% lived in rural areas.

The median age was 38.4 years; 21.0% of residents were under the age of 18 and 15.5% were 65 years of age or older. For every 100 females there were 97.3 males, and for every 100 females age 18 and over there were 94.9 males age 18 and over.

There were 4,705 households in Reading, of which 24.8% had children under the age of 18 living in them. Of all households, 36.0% were married-couple households, 25.0% were households with a male householder and no spouse or partner present, and 30.9% were households with a female householder and no spouse or partner present. About 37.9% of all households were made up of individuals and 11.8% had someone living alone who was 65 years of age or older.

There were 5,059 housing units, of which 7.0% were vacant. The homeowner vacancy rate was 1.3% and the rental vacancy rate was 8.1%.

Racial composition as of the 2020 census
Race	Number	Percent
White	8,622	81.3%
Black or African American	1,045	9.9%
American Indian and Alaska Native	15	0.1%
Asian	160	1.5%
Native Hawaiian and Other Pacific Islander	11	0.1%
Some other race	131	1.2%
Two or more races	616	5.8%
Hispanic or Latino (of any race)	299	2.8%

According to the U.S. Census American Community Survey, for the period 2016-2020 the estimated median annual income for a household in the city was $56,929, and the median income for a family was $77,386. About 10.6% of the population were living below the poverty line, including 18.1% of those under age 18 and 3.0% of those age 65 or over. About 63.8% of the population were employed, and 22.6% had a bachelor's degree or higher.

=== 2010 census ===
As of the census of 2010, there were 10,385 people, 4,554 households, and 2,624 families residing in the city. The population density was 3,593.4 inhabitants per square mile (1,387.4/km^{2}). There were 4,962 housing units at an average density of 1,717.0 per square mile (662.9/km^{2}). The racial makeup of the city was 89.1% White, 7.3% African American, 0.1% Native American, 1.0% Asian, 0.6% from other races, and 1.9% from two or more races. Hispanic or Latino of any race were 1.7% of the population.

There were 4,554 households, of which 26.8% had children under the age of 18 living with them, 39.0% were married couples living together, 13.3% had a female householder with no husband present, 5.3% had a male householder with no wife present, and 42.4% were non-families. 36.6% of all households were made up of individuals, and 11.1% had someone living alone who was 65 years of age or older. The average household size was 2.26 and the average family size was 2.97.

The median age in the city was 39.5 years. 21.6% of residents were under the age of 18; 8.6% were between the ages of 18 and 24; 27.2% were from 25 to 44; 27.5% were from 45 to 64; and 14.9% were 65 years of age or older. The gender makeup of the city was 49.1% male and 50.9% female.

=== 2000 census ===
As of the census of 2000, there were 11,292 people, 4,885 households, and 2,921 families residing in the city. The population density was 3,867.6 inhabitants per square mile (1,493.3/km^{2}). There were 5,128 housing units at an average density of 1,756.4 per square mile (678.1/km^{2}). The racial makeup of the city was 93.69% White, 3.20% African American, 0.16% Native American, 1.18% Asian, 0.02% Pacific Islander, 0.51% from other races, and 1.25% from two or more races. Hispanic or Latino of any race were 0.79% of the population.

There were 4,885 households, out of which 27.1% had children under the age of 18 living with them, 44.7% were married couples living together, 11.0% had a female householder with no husband present, and 40.2% were non-families. 34.3% of all households were made up of individuals, and 11.8% had someone living alone who was 65 years of age or older. The average household size was 2.27 and the average family size was 2.96.

In the city the population was spread out, with 22.5% under the age of 18, 9.3% from 18 to 24, 31.1% from 25 to 44, 21.1% from 45 to 64, and 16.0% who were 65 years of age or older. The median age was 38 years. For every 100 females, there were 94.8 males. For every 100 females age 18 and over, there were 91.2 males.

The median income for a household in the city was $39,140, and the median income for a family was $51,858. Males had a median income of $35,466 versus $26,250 for females. The per capita income for the city was $23,527. About 4.7% of families and 7.3% of the population were below the poverty line, including 7.8% of those under age 18 and 10.2% of those age 65 or over.

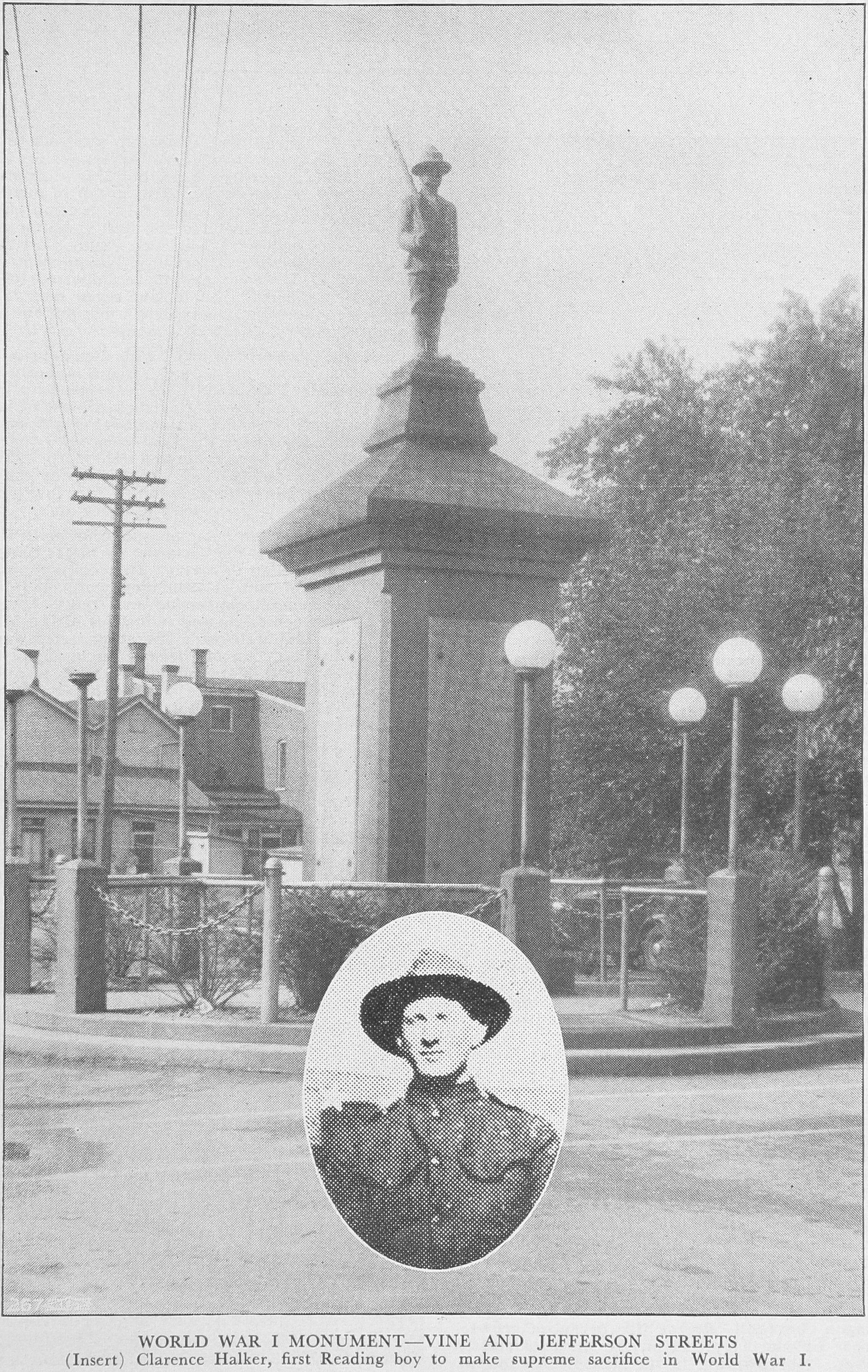
"WORLD WAR I MONUMENT–VINE AND JEFFERSON STREETS (Insert) Clarence Halker, first Reading boy to make supreme sacrifice in World War I."

== Economy ==
Like other communities in the Mill Creek Valley, Reading has an economy dominated by heavy industry, including suppliers for aerospace and automotive plants in nearby Sharonville and Evendale. Thermo Fisher Scientific's Patheon subsidiary operates a pharmaceutical manufacturing plant on 30 acres (12 ha) in the city.

The Bridal District along Benson Street in downtown Reading is the most well-known concentration of wedding-related businesses in the United States.

The electronics store chain Steinberg's was founded and based in Reading until its bankruptcy and liquidation in 1997.

== Government ==
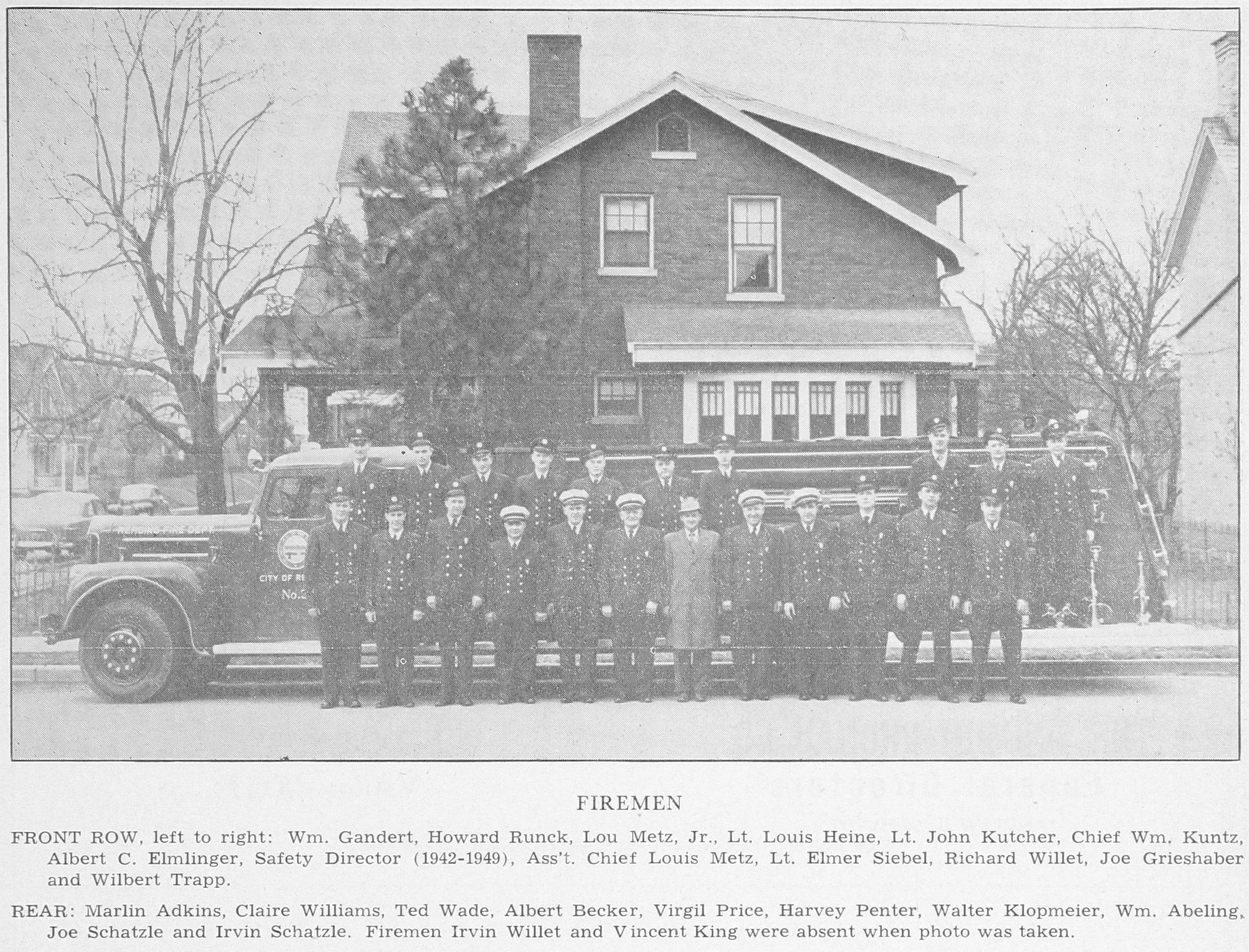
Reading, Ohio Fire Department in 1951

Reading uses a mayor–council form of government. The city council consists of a tie-breaking President of Council, four members representing wards, and three at-large members. As of 2023, the Mayor of Reading is Robert "Bo" Bemmes and the current council president is Kevin Mattscheck.

Reading is one of 23 municipalities in Hamilton County that maintains a mayor's court, in which traffic cases and other misdemeanor cases are heard by a magistrate.

At the federal level, Reading is located within Ohio's 2nd congressional district. At the state level, Reading belongs to the 28th House district and 8th Senate district. See Ohio House of Representatives and Ohio Senate for the current representatives of the respective state districts.

== Education ==
Reading is served by the Reading Community City School District, which includes Reading High School. A new Pre K-12 school opened up Monday September 9, 2019.

Reading also includes a Roman Catholic all-girl's high school, Mount Notre Dame High School, where the daughter of Civil War general William Tecumseh Sherman was one of the first students. Also included is a Catholic elementary school, Sts. Peter and Paul Academy serve students in grades K-8.

Reading is served by a branch of the Public Library of Cincinnati and Hamilton County.

== Media ==
Reading is part of the Cincinnati media market for newspapers, radio, and television. WMKV (89.3 FM) broadcasts from a retirement community in Reading.

== Notable people ==
- Ed Biles, professional football coach, Houston Oilers
- John Boehner, Speaker of the U.S. House of Representatives from 2011 to 2015
- Rick Christophel, professional football coach, Tampa Bay Buccaneers
- Ralph Davis, professional basketball player
- Richard E. Meyer, businessman and record producer
- Brian O'Connor, professional baseball pitcher
- Merle Robbins, inventor of the card game Uno
- Joseph G. Wilson, Republican politician in Oregon
- DeShawn Wynn, professional football player

== See also ==
- List of sundown towns in the United States
