= DeShawn Wynn =

American gridiron football player (born 1983)

No. 42, 21, 29, 35
- Position: Running back

Personal information
- Born: October 9, 1983 (age 43); Cincinnati, Ohio, U.S.
- Listed height: 5 ft 8 in (1.73 m)
- Listed weight: 232 lb (105 kg)

Career information
- High school: Reading (Reading, Ohio)
- College: Florida
- NFL draft: 2007: 7th round, 228th overall pick

Career history
- Green Bay Packers (2007–2009); New Orleans Saints (2010); San Francisco 49ers (2010); New Orleans Saints (2010); Saskatchewan Roughriders (2012)*
- * Offseason or practice squad member only

Awards and highlights
- BCS national champion (2006)

Career NFL statistics
- Rushing attempts: 64
- Rushing yards: 332
- Rushing touchdowns: 5
- Receptions: 14
- Receiving yards: 122
- Stats at Pro Football Reference

DeShawn Wynn (born October 9, 1983) is an American former professional football player who was a running back in the National Football League (NFL) for four seasons. He played college football for the Florida Gators, and was a member of their 2006 National Championship team. He was selected by the Green Bay Packers in the seventh round of the 2007 NFL draft, and also played for the New Orleans Saints and San Francisco 49ers of the NFL.

== Early life ==
Wynn was born in Cincinnati, Ohio in 1983. He attended Reading High School in Reading, Ohio, where he played high school football for the Reading Blue Devils. As a senior in 2001, he was regarded as one of the nation's elite high school backs, with 2,283 yards on 246 carries with thirty touchdowns. Wynn rushed for 2,000 or more yards three of four years, and also played linebacker and safety. He was recognized as a Parade magazine high school All-American in 2002.

== College career ==
Wynn accepted an athletic scholarship to attend the University of Florida in Gainesville, Florida, where he played for coach Ron Zook and coach Urban Meyer's Florida Gators football teams from 2003 to 2006. He was the Gators' starting running back in their 41–14 victory over the Ohio State Buckeyes in the 2007 BCS National Championship Game. Wynn finished his four-year college career with 2,077 rushing yards, 376 receiving yards and twenty-five touchdowns.

== Professional career ==
=== Green Bay Packers ===
Wynn was drafted 228th overall by the Green Bay Packers in the seventh round of the 2007 NFL draft. He played for the Packers for three seasons from 2007 to 2009.

Wynn scored his first two career touchdowns against the New York Giants in Week 2 of the NFL season. He also scored a touchdown in back to back weeks versus the Chicago Bears and the Washington Redskins.

On October 29, 2007 against the Denver Broncos on Monday Night Football, Wynn injured his shoulder on his first rushing play of the game. The next day Wynn was put on injured reserve and missed the rest of the season. He finished the season with 203 rushing yards on 50 attempts and four touchdowns.

On August 25, 2008, Wynn was released by the Packers. He was re-signed to the Packers practice squad on August 31. He remained there until October 11, when he was signed to the active roster after running back Kregg Lumpkin was placed on injured reserve. He finished the season playing in five games rushing for 110 yards on eight attempts, with 73 of those yards coming on a week 17 touchdown run against the Detroit Lions.

=== New Orleans Saints (first stint) ===
Wynn signed with the New Orleans Saints on August 23, 2010. He was released on September 22. He was re-signed to the practice squad the next day and signed to the active roster again on October 2. He was waived again on October 12.

=== San Francisco 49ers ===
On November 5, 2010 Wynn was signed by the San Francisco 49ers to their practice squad. He was promoted to the active roster a few weeks later after Frank Gore was placed on Injured Reserve with a broken hip. On December 27, 2010, Wynn was waived by the 49ers.

=== New Orleans Saints (second stint) ===
Wynn was re-signed by the New Orleans Saints on January 3, 2011.

=== Saskatchewan Roughriders ===
On March 13, 2012, it was announced that Wynn had been signed by the Saskatchewan Roughriders.

== See also ==
- List of Florida Gators in the NFL draft
