= WLHS =

- West Chester, Ohio; United States
- Broadcast area: Cincinnati
- Frequency: 89.9 MHz
- Branding: WLHS-FM

Programming
- Format: Old Time Radio/Big Band

Ownership
- Owner: Lakota Local School District

Technical information
- Licensing authority: FCC
- Facility ID: 36445
- Class: A
- ERP: 85 watts
- HAAT: 108.2 meters
- Transmitter coordinates: 39°19′10.00″N 84°22′4.00″W

Links
- Public license information: Public file; LMS

WLHS (89.9 FM) is a Classic Radio station broadcasting the golden age of radio format. Licensed to West Chester, Ohio, United States, the radio station serves the greater Cincinnati, Ohio, area. The station is currently owned by the Lakota Local School District.

== History ==
The Lakota Local School District formerly used it for students. It had live programming during school hours and on Saturday. All other shows were taped. In July 2013, WLHS began a simulcast of WMKV FM 89.3, owned by Maple Knoll Communities.
