= Clara Ann Thompson =

African-American poet

- Born: January 22, 1869; Rossmoyne, Ohio, U.S.
- Died: March 18, 1949 (aged 80)
- Occupations: Teacher, poet
- Relatives: Clara Jane Gray Thompson (Mother, 1836-1880) John Henry Thompson (Father, 1822-?) Priscilla Jane Thompson (Sister, 1871–1942) Garland Yancey Thompson (Brother) Aaron Belford Thompson (Brother) Samuel Thompson (Brother)
- Writing career
- Notable work: "Songs from the Wayside" "A Garland of Poems"
- Movement: Religious Poetry

Clara Ann Thompson (1869–1949) was an African-American poet, teacher and civil rights advocate. Thompson was born in Rossmoyne, Ohio. Thompson's parents, John Henry and Clara Jane Gray Thompson, were previously enslaved in Virginia.

Thompson's most notable collection of poetry was "Songs from the Wayside" (1908). Thompson's "A Garland of Poems" (1926) was her second collection. Some of her poems appeared in "An Anthology of Verse by American Negroes" (1924).

== Life ==
Thompson spent most of her life in Rossmoyne, although she did some teaching outside of her hometown. She did not marry, but lived most of her life with two of her siblings, Priscilla Jane Thompson and Garland Yancey Thompson.

Clara Ann Thompson died on March 18, 1959, due to a cerebral hemorrhage in her hometown of Rossmoyne, Ohio. Thompson is buried alongside her family, but does not have a known grave location.

== Activism ==
Thompson was active in the Young Women's Christian Association (YWCA) and her local church, Zion Baptist. She was also a member of the National Association for the Advancement of Colored People (NAACP), and an advocate for African American civil rights. Whenever the NAACP chapter in Cincinnati first began, both Priscilla and Clara joined to promote civil rights. Thompson was inspired by the activism in this group to write more race-related poetry, such as “What Mean This Bleating of the Sheep?”. This poem was recited in Cincinnati and Indianapolis churches, sometimes standing beside her brother, Aaron Belford. Thompson was introduced to Booker T. Washington and James Whitcomb Riley while in Indianapolis. Through this organization and meetings with other NAACP members, the Thompson family had a direct influence in the Harlem Renaissance and on Washington, D.C. Because of the popularity of Thompson's poem, she copyrighted it in 1921 into a pamphlet that she could publish at any time.

== Works ==
=== "Songs from the Wayside" ===
This is a copy of "Songs from the Wayside" a series of religious poems that Clara Ann Thompson self-published in 1908.

Thompson used her own printing press to publish this collection of work. Her first poetry collection, with 35 poems, is particularly religious and uses Christian language. Thompson also uses "dialect language", or black vernacular English. The content of this poetry collection includes "“meditations on spirituality, black folk wisdom, and nature.” Thompson dedicated this poetry collection to her siblings Garland and Priscilla, and she dedicated the first poem in this collection to her deceased brother, Samuel. Thompson.

=== "A Garland of Poems" ===
Thompson published her second collection of poetry, "A Garland of Poems", with a publishing company in Boston called the Christopher Publishing House in 1926. This poetry collection was singularly dedicated to Garland Yancey, saying "in recognition of his unfailing Kindness and Affection". While Thompson was finding herself more comfortable with her religious self, her previous race-related works started to diminish. This was during the World Wars, so this collection of poems was meant to find comfort and guidance during these troubling times.

== Bibliography ==
- Bolden, Tonya. “Digital Schomburg African American Women Writers of the 19th Century.” AAWW Biographies, The New York Public Library, 2000, digital.nypl.org/schomburg/writers_aa19/bio2.html.
- Parascandola, Louis J., and Camille E. Beazer. “Thompson, Priscilla Jane (1871-1942), Poet and Lecturer.” American National Biography, Oxford University Press, 2020, www.anb.org/view/10.1093/anb/9780198606697.001.0001/anb-9780198606697-e-1602883.
- Thompson, Clara Ann. “‘Songs from the Wayside," by Clara Ann Thompson (1908).” Women of the Early Harlem Renaissance: African American Women Writers 1900–1922, Scalar, 7 Nov. 2018, scalar.lehigh.edu/harlemwomen/songs-from-the-wayside-by-clara-ann-thompson-1908.
- Queensofcincy. “Clara Ann Thompson.” Queens of Queen City, Queens of Queen City, 4 Feb. 2019, queensofqueencity.com/2019/02/04/clara-ann-thompson/.
