= Bill Cunningham (talk show host) =

American talk show host

- Born: William Daniel Cunningham; December 11, 1947 (age 78); Covington, Kentucky, U.S.
- Occupations: talk show host, syndicated radio host, entrepreneur, attorney
- Spouse: Penelope R. Cunningham
- Children: 1

William Daniel Cunningham (born December 11, 1947) is an American radio and television talk show host, conservative commentator, attorney, and entrepreneur.

On the radio, he hosts The Big Show with Bill Cunningham, heard weekdays on AM 700 WLW in Cincinnati, and Sunday Nights with Bill Cunningham, a program syndicated nationally by Premiere Radio Networks. (Both WLW and Premiere Networks are subsidiaries of iHeartMedia, Inc.)

On television he hosted The Bill Cunningham Show that aired for an hour on weekdays on The CW from 2011 to 2016. He is also a commentator/contributor for Fox News Channel.

Cunningham has won the National Association of Broadcasters Marconi Award for Large-Market Personality of the Year twice, in 2001 and in 2009.

== Law ==
Cunningham was admitted to the Ohio Bar in 1975 after graduating from the University of Toledo College of Law. Cunningham did a stint as a staff attorney with the Legal Aid Society of Cincinnati-Public Defender Division. He then served in the office of the Ohio Attorney General as Assistant Attorney General from 1978 to 1986 under Attorneys General William J. Brown and Anthony J. Celebrezze Jr. Currently, Cunningham works in the law firm of Steven R. Adams, which specializes in criminal defense and DUI cases.

== Radio ==
Cunningham has been on 50,000-watt radio station 700 WLW for over 40 years, beginning in 1983. His first regular show on the station was at night, generally from 9:00 p.m. until midnight. His show was not heard during the summer months, when WLW broadcasts Cincinnati Reds baseball games. In the late 1990s, Cunningham's show was moved to early afternoons, which put his show directly opposite that of one of his favorite radio presenters, Rush Limbaugh, whose show is heard on sister station WKRC.

Cunningham's WLW show went on a brief hiatus in June 2010 due to a contract dispute. Soon after, WLW's owner, Clear Channel, announced that he signed a long-term agreement to stay with the station. In released remarks commenting on his decision, Cunningham said, "Cincinnati is my home. The first air I breathed. The first milk I drank was from Cincinnati. Others may have come as carpetbaggers to loot the Queen City and then move on. Willie will remain true."

=== Controversies ===
In December 2003, Cunningham created a parody song mocking Nathaniel Jones, a man killed by Cincinnati police, with lyrics including: "The fat man ever after has a martyr's place/ Let's all ignore whatever drugs he had...His death was unrelated to his injuries but still we hear the people sing police brutality/ lies go on bro la la how the lies go on."

On February 26, 2008, Cunningham created controversy in his warm-up speech introducing Republican presidential candidate John McCain at a Cincinnati rally because Cunningham twice referred to Democratic candidate Barack Obama with Obama's full name, Barack Hussein Obama, and called Obama a "hack Chicago-style Daley politician". McCain immediately repudiated Cunningham after being told about Cunningham's remarks. In response, Cunningham said in an interview with CNN following the rally: "John McCain threw me under a bus... I've had it up to here with John McCain. I'm joining Ann Coulter in supporting Hillary Clinton." Cunningham would continue to be a sharp critic of Obama; on his October 28, 2008 WLW show, Cunningham discussed the life of Obama's father Barack Obama, Sr. and then remarked, "... his father was a typical black father who, right after the birth, left the baby. That's what black fathers do. They simply leave." This remark has been cited as an example of hyperbolic, extreme rhetoric on talk radio. Another Cunningham statement that has been criticized was his claim on the January 4, 2009, WLW show that poor people "lack values, ethics and morals." These statements, also including comparisons between Obama and Hitler and suggesting that Obama wanted to murder Jews the way Hitler did, led to Cunningham being named "one of the most prolific purveyors of hate speech" by a left-leaning media watchdog group Media Matters.

In October 2022, on his radio show Cunningham promoted the widely debunked litter boxes in schools hoax, stating that litter boxes were being provided in schools for students dressing up as cats to defecate in, while interviewing Ohio Republican Senate candidate JD Vance.

=== The Stooge Report ===
A popular part of his radio show is known as "The Stooge Report," which begins with a clip of the Three Stooges harmonizing the word "hello" and Moe saying "quiet numbskulls, I'm broadcasting." This segment has Cunningham riffing on current events in a humorous way, often joined by sports talk host Bill "Seg" Dennison and anyone else in the studio. It lasts about 15 minutes and ends when Bill says, "Segman, get me out of The Stooge Report." at which point Seg Dennison responds, "Willie, in honor of [insert a topic covered in today's Stooge Report], I leave you with the immortal words of the Stoooooooooge Report." This occurs two times a show, after the 1:30 and 2:30 newscasts.

== Television ==
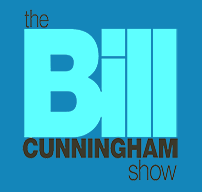
Cunningham logo

The Bill Cunningham Show, a first-run syndicated television talk show hosted by Cunningham debuted on September 19, 2011. Cunningham served as the show's co-producer. It was produced and distributed by Tribune Broadcasting and at first aired only on Tribune-owned stations, stations owned by Local TV, LLC and Raycom Media-owned WXIX-TV in Cunningham's hometown of Cincinnati, prior to making a nationwide launch. It moved to The CW beginning September 10, 2012, where it was seen nationally.

The series used a tabloid-style format with a conservative approach. The program was produced in New York City, with co-production from ITV Studios America. Cunningham did his radio show from New York City on Tuesdays, Wednesdays, and Thursdays because he taped his TV show on those days.

On May 27, 2016, Cunningham announced that he mutually agreed to cancel his own talk show, which ended on September 9, 2016.

== Personal life ==
Born in Covington, Kentucky, Cunningham grew up in Deer Park, Ohio, and graduated from Deer Park High School in 1966. Cunningham was one of four children and has described his father as an abusive alcoholic who left the family when Cunningham was 11 and his other siblings were 13, nine and four (he has an older brother and a younger brother and sister). Before his mother's death in 2010, he frequently called her on the air during his radio show; he referred to her as "Ma."

At Deer Park High, Cunningham played on the basketball team and was the top scorer among all Cincinnati area high school basketball players his senior year. The Cincinnati Enquirer named him one of the top 100 Cincinnati-area high school basketball players in history.

Cunningham later earned degrees from Xavier University, where he played for four years on the baseball team, serving as captain, and the University of Toledo College of Law. He is married to his high school sweetheart, Judge Penelope R. Cunningham of the Ohio District Courts of Appeals. They have one son and two grandchildren.

On March 12, 2019, Cunningham announced on the radio he would need to have an aortic valve replacement in the coming weeks.
