= Reading Community City School District =

School district in Ohio, United States

Address
- 810 East Columbia Avenue Reading, Ohio, 45215; United States

District information
- Type: Public
- Grades: PK–12
- Superintendent: Dr. Damon C. Davis
- Schools: 2
- NCES District ID: 3904469

Students and staff
- Students: 1,424 (2024–2025)
- Teachers: 94.19 (on an FTE basis) (2024–2025)
- Staff: 200.59 (on an FTE basis) (2024–2025)
- Student–teacher ratio: 15.12 (2024–2025)

Other information
- Website: www.readingschools.org

Reading Community City School District, is a school district in Hamilton County, Ohio. It serves the town of Reading, Ohio, located about 8 miles (13 km) north of downtown Cincinnati.

The district has approximately 1,400 students enrolled in grades Kindergarten through grade 12.

== Schools ==
There are 2 schools in the district:

- Reading High School
- Reading Elementary School
