= Silverton, Ohio =

- Village
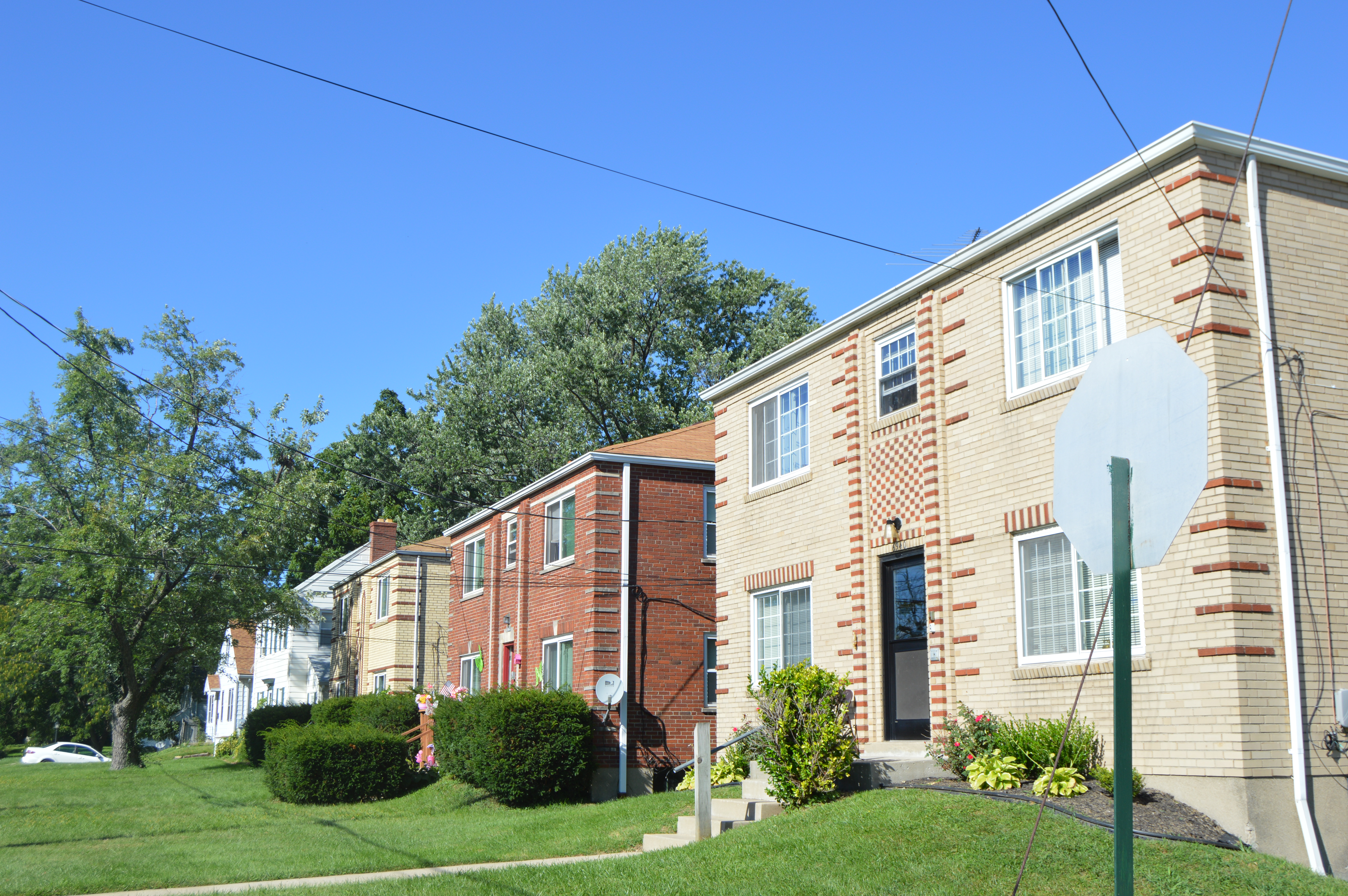
- Post-World War II housing on Silverton Avenue
- Motto: "A Front Porch Community"
- Location in Hamilton County and the state of Ohio
- Coordinates: 39°11′18″N 84°24′03″W
- Country: United States
- State: Ohio
- County: Hamilton

Government
  - Type: Council-Manager
  - Mayor: John A. Smith (D)

Area
  - Total: 1.11 sq mi (2.88 km^{2})
  - Land: 1.11 sq mi (2.88 km^{2})
  - Water: 0 sq mi (0.00 km^{2})
- Elevation: 820 ft (250 m)

Population (2020)
  - Total: 4,908
  - Density: 4,409.2/sq mi (1,702.41/km^{2})
- Time zone: UTC-5 (Eastern (EST))
  - Summer (DST): UTC-4 (EDT)
- ZIP code: 45236
- Area code: 513
- FIPS code: 39-72522
- GNIS feature ID: 1086228
- Website: silvertonohio.us

Silverton is a village in Hamilton County, Ohio, United States. The village was formed out of Columbia and Sycamore townships, but withdrew from both and formed a paper township. The population was 4,908 at the 2020 census.

== History ==
Formed out of Columbia and Sycamore townships, Silverton had its beginnings in the post-Revolutionary War land grants. In 1809 David Mosner opened a general store at the crossroads of Plainfield Pike and Montgomery Road. For the next several decades the surrounding town was known alternately as "Mosner" or "Enterprise". The Mosner name was formalized in 1861 when a post office opened under that designation.

In 1883 the Cincinnati, Lebanon and Northern Railway opened a line through town, connecting the area to Cincinnati by rail. Seth Haines and Robert Cresap platted Silverton's first subdivision shortly thereafter. It is widely accepted that the town was renamed Silverton in honor of Haines' wife, Elizabeth Silver Haines.

In 1884 the community was incorporated as the Hamlet of Silverton. The early subdivisions were designed to appeal to investors as well as prospective homeowners. These subdivisions were divided into large lots, as most of them had 25-foot (7.6 m) frontages.

The hamlet slowly developed into a suburb over the next twenty years, with village status attained by general election in 1904. The village was by then served by the Interurban Railway & Terminal Company line, which ran along Montgomery Road (now U.S. Route 22), as well as the CL&N. Residents regularly commuted to jobs in Cincinnati.

By 1910 the village had a population of 459. Silverton grew over the next 50 years, attaining city status in 1961 with a population exceeding 5,500.

Around the beginning of the 20th century, the John C. Meier Grape Juice Company purchased land along the railroad line and began producing grape juice and wine in Silverton. Now known as Meier's Wine Cellars, it is both the oldest and largest winery in Ohio.

Silverton's demographics began to expand in the 1960s to include more African-American families. The "white flight" experienced by many other communities was not a factor in Silverton. Organizations like the Silverton Neighborhood Association were formed to break through cultural barriers and to promote dialogue between neighbors. As a result, Silverton transformed itself into a integrated community.

In 1974, Silverton elected its first African American Mayor, Richard F. Hunter, Sr. who served as a Silverton Councilmember previously. Mayor Hunter served the City of Silverton as Mayor over 20 years and longer than any mayor in the city’s history.

Silverton received recognition as a Tree City USA community in 2008.

== Geography ==
According to the United States Census Bureau, the village has a total area of 1.11 square miles (2.87 km^{2}), all land.

== Demographics ==
Historical population
Census	Pop.	Note	%±
1910	459		—
1920	795		73.2%
1930	1,843		131.8%
1940	2,907		57.7%
1950	4,827		66.0%
1960	6,682		38.4%
1970	6,588		−1.4%
1980	6,172		−6.3%
1990	5,859		−5.1%
2000	5,178		−11.6%
2010	4,788		−7.5%
2020	4,908		2.5%
U.S. Decennial Census

=== Racial and ethnic composition ===
Silverton village, Ohio – Racial and ethnic composition Note: the US Census treats Hispanic/Latino as an ethnic category. This table excludes Latinos from the racial categories and assigns them to a separate category. Hispanics/Latinos may be of any race.
Race / Ethnicity (NH = Non-Hispanic)	Pop 2000	Pop 2010	Pop 2020	% 2000	% 2010	% 2020
White alone (NH)	2,336	2,036	2,290	45.11%	42.52%	46.66%
Black or African American alone (NH)	2,598	2,456	2,034	50.17%	51.29%	41.44%
Native American or Alaska Native alone (NH)	10	15	10	0.19%	0.31%	0.20%
Asian alone (NH)	42	38	66	0.81%	0.79%	1.34%
Native Hawaiian or Pacific Islander alone (NH)	2	1	4	0.04%	0.02%	0.08%
Other race alone (NH)	16	4	21	0.31%	0.08%	0.43%
Mixed race or Multiracial (NH)	114	119	262	2.20%	2.49%	5.34%
Hispanic or Latino (any race)	60	119	221	1.16%	2.49%	4.50%
Total	5,178	4,788	4,908	100.00%	100.00%	100.00%

=== 2020 census ===
As of the 2020 census, Silverton had a population of 4,908. The population density was 4,409.70 people per square mile (1,702.41/km^{2}). 100.0% of residents lived in urban areas, while 0.0% lived in rural areas.

The median age was 40.6 years. 14.8% of residents were under the age of 18 and 19.3% were 65 years of age or older. For every 100 females there were 91.6 males, and for every 100 females age 18 and over there were 90.3 males age 18 and over.

There were 2,597 households, of which 17.3% had children under the age of 18 living in them. Of all households, 25.7% were married-couple households, 27.3% were households with a male householder and no spouse or partner present, and 39.1% were households with a female householder and no spouse or partner present. About 49.4% of all households were made up of individuals and 14.2% had someone living alone who was 65 years of age or older. The average household size was 1.91, and the average family size was 3.07.

There were 2,884 housing units, of which 10.0% were vacant. The homeowner vacancy rate was 1.1% and the rental vacancy rate was 12.0%.

=== Income and poverty ===
According to the U.S. Census American Community Survey, for the period 2016-2020 the estimated median annual income for a household in the village was $46,029, and the median income for a family was $81,106. About 18.9% of the population were living below the poverty line, including 23.9% of those under age 18 and 30.0% of those age 65 or over. About 60.6% of the population were employed, and 27.5% had a bachelor's degree or higher.

=== 2010 census ===
As of the census of 2010, there were 4,788 people, 2,404 households, and 1,131 families residing in the village. The population decrease to below 5,000 reverted Silverton's legal designation to village instead of city. The population density was 4,313.5 inhabitants per square mile (1,665.5/km^{2}). There were 2,626 housing units at an average density of 2,365.8 per square mile (913.4/km^{2}). The racial makeup of the village was 44.0% White, 51.4% African American, 0.3% Native American, 0.8% Asian, 0.7% from other races, and 2.7% from two or more races. Hispanic or Latino of any race were 2.5% of the population.

There were 2,404 households, of which 19.2% had children under the age of 18 living with them, 27.4% were married couples living together, 16.1% had a female householder with no husband present, 3.6% had a male householder with no wife present, and 53.0% were non-families. 45.0% of all households were made up of individuals, and 11.2% had someone living alone who was 65 years of age or older. The average household size was 1.95 and the average family size was 2.77.

The median age in the village was 43.3 years. 15.9% of residents were under the age of 18; 8.4% were between the ages of 18 and 24; 27.9% were from 25 to 44; 31% were from 45 to 64; and 16.8% were 65 years of age or older. The gender makeup of the village was 46.2% male and 53.8% female.

=== 2000 census ===
As of the census of 2000, there were 5,178 people, 2,534 households, and 1,256 families residing in the city. The population density was 4,647.8 inhabitants per square mile (1,794.5/km^{2}). There were 2,662 housing units at an average density of 2,389.4 per square mile (922.6/km^{2}). The racial makeup of the city was 45.52% White, 50.31% African American, 0.19% Native American, 0.81% Asian, 0.04% Pacific Islander, 0.77% from other races, and 2.36% from two or more races. Hispanic or Latino of any race were 1.16% of the population.

There were 2,534 households, out of which 19.5% had children under the age of 18 living with them, 32.2% were married couples living together, 14.4% had a female householder with no husband present, and 50.4% were non-families. 45.4% of all households were made up of individuals, and 12.5% had someone living alone who was 65 years of age or older. The average household size was 2.00 and the average family size was 2.84.

In the city the population was spread out, with 18.8% under the age of 18, 8.6% from 18 to 24, 31.3% from 25 to 44, 22.4% from 45 to 64, and 18.8% who were 65 years of age or older. The median age was 39 years. For every 100 females there were 80.8 males. For every 100 females age 18 and over, there were 74.9 males.

The median income for a household in the city was $35,117, and the median income for a family was $43,633. Males had a median income of $27,682 versus $27,500 for females. The per capita income for the city was $18,971. About 5.8% of families and 9.5% of the population were below the poverty line, including 10.9% of those under age 18 and 9.2% of those age 65 or over.

== Government ==
The Village of Silverton is a charter municipality and operates under the council-manager form of government, combining the strong political leadership of elected officials with the professional expertise of an appointed village manager.

Legislative authority under this form of government is vested in Village Council, the body that is chosen by the electorate. Council hires the manager to serve as the village's full-time chief executive officer.

Silverton Village Council consists of six members elected at-large to serve two year terms. In addition to appointing the village manager and passing legislation, Council approves the annual operating budget, contracts in the village's name, levies taxes, and appoints a village attorney.

The Mayor, who is directly elected to a two-year term, serves as the official and ceremonial head of the village and presides over all meetings of Council. He has the right to introduce legislation and to take part in discussion of all matters before Council with the right to vote in the event of a tie.

The village manager is responsible for the day-to-day operations of the village, implements Council action, hires and oversees the staff, prepares and implements the annual operating budget and keeps the elected officials advised of the village's financial viability. .

== Municipal services ==
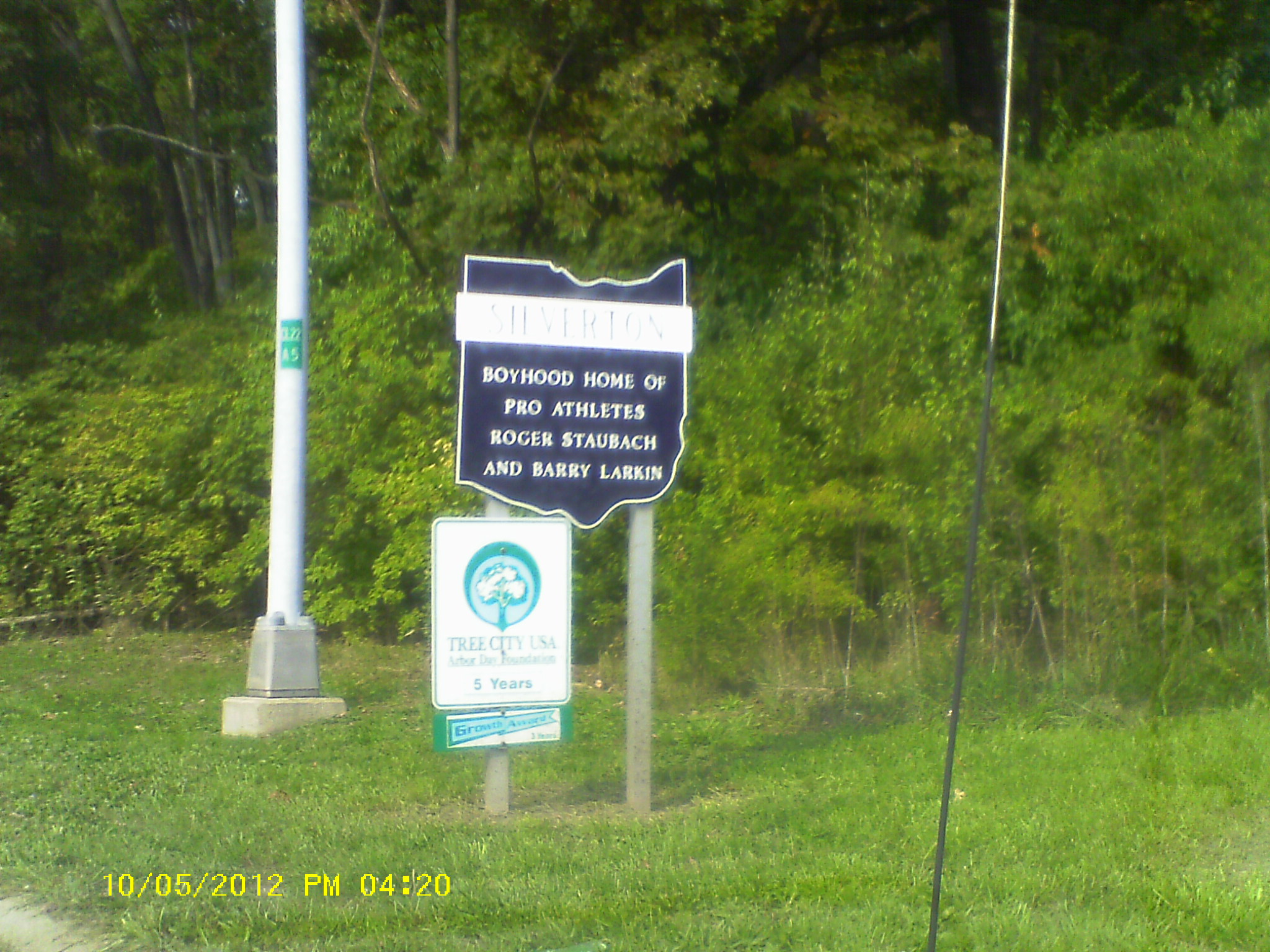
Northbound Stewart Road at I-71

Silverton offers a wide range of municipal services. The village is patrolled by the Hamilton County Sheriff's Office (HCSO) deputies. In 1999 the residents of Silverton and neighboring Deer Park voted to form the Deer Park Silverton Joint Fire District. The district offers fire protection and EMS/paramedic services to the communities of Silverton and Deer Park, as well as Golf Manor and portions of Columbia Township.

Residents of Silverton enjoy two parks: Ralph Ficke Memorial Park and Silverton Park.

Ficke Park was the larger of the two at 12 acres (49,000 m^{2}). It offered a playground, baseball diamonds, a regulation size soccer field, full court basketball, hard court tennis and a batting cage. Two shelters were available for rental. Park events include an annual Easter egg hunt and a summer concert series.

The village council unanimously approved a land swap with Cincinnati Public Schools in order to build a new school on half of Ficke Park. The move is opposed by nearby residents, especially in neighboring Sycamore Township who argue that they were not consulted or informed of the proposed land swap. The land swap will likely be challenged on the premise that the land deed forbids the use of the land for anything other than a park or similar. On July 14, 2008, the Cincinnati Board of Education approved the land swap.

As a result of the land swap, CPS now owns half of Ficke park. The CPS owned half contains the shelters (that are no longer available for rental), the tennis courts (which no longer have nets), the playground and the basketball court. When construction for the new school begins, all these facilities will be lost. Some are scheduled to be rebuilt in the remaining half of the park.

Silverton Park is located in the center of town in a "village green" setting. The Kuhnell Museum, a replica of the village's original train depot, is located in the park. The museum is a source of great pride for Silverton residents. Johnny Kuhnell, the village's Chief of Police from 1946 to 1969, envisioned a replicated station as a focal point of the community, so he organized an effort to reconstruct the station. His goal was realized in 1974 when construction of the replica was completed. The museum was rededicated in honor and memory of Chief Kuhnell in 2001.

The station today serves as a museum dedicated to the preservation of Silverton history for future generations. Inside you will find photographs, articles and memorabilia related to the Silverton area from the 1800s to the present. Visitors will gain perspective on the village's history and the pride employed by area pioneers. The museum is open to the public on the second and fourth Sunday of each month from 2:00 p.m. to 5:00 p.m, April through September.

== Notable people ==
- Barry Larkin, MLB Hall of Fame member and Gold Glove winner
- Carl Lindner, Fortune 500 CEO
- Roger Staubach, Heisman Trophy winner and NFL Hall of Fame quarterback
