= Highpoint, Ohio =

Highpoint
- Census-designated place (CDP) & Unincorporated community
- Location in Hamilton County and the state of Ohio.
- Coordinates: 39°17′21″N 84°20′50″W
- Country: United States
- State: Ohio
- County: Hamilton

Area
  - Total: 0.34 sq mi (0.89 km^{2})
  - Land: 0.34 sq mi (0.89 km^{2})
  - Water: 0 sq mi (0.00 km^{2})
- Elevation: 869 ft (265 m)

Population (2020)
  - Total: 1,558
  - Density: 4,526.1/sq mi (1,747.55/km^{2})
- Time zone: UTC-5 (Eastern (EST))
  - Summer (DST): UTC-4 (EDT)
- Area code: 513
- GNIS feature ID: 2585510

Highpoint (also known as High Point) is an unincorporated community and census-designated place (CDP) in Sycamore Township, Hamilton County, Ohio, United States, located about 20 miles north of Cincinnati, Ohio. As of the 2020 census, its population was 1,558. Highpoint was founded in the 19th century.

== Demographics ==
As of the census of 2020, there were 1,558 people living in the CDP, for a population density of 4,529.07 people per square mile (1,747.55/km^{2}). There were 630 housing units. The racial makeup of the CDP was 65.1% White, 6.0% Black or African American, 0.5% Native American, 3.5% Asian, 10.6% Pacific Islander, 6.4% from some other race, and 7.9% from two or more races. 10.3% of the population were Hispanic or Latino of any race.

There were 580 households, out of which 19.0% had children under the age of 18 living with them, 44.3% were married couples living together, 38.6% had a male householder with no spouse present, and 9.5% had a female householder with no spouse present. 33.1% of all households were made up of individuals, and 16.2% were someone living alone who was 65 years of age or older. The average household size was 2.18, and the average family size was 2.91.

16.0% of the CDP's population were under the age of 18, 66.9% were 18 to 64, and 17.1% were 65 years of age or older. The median age was 40.9. For every 100 females, there were 189.7 males.

According to the U.S. Census American Community Survey, for the period 2016-2020 the estimated median annual income for a household in the CDP was $75,852, and the median income for a family was $83,533. About 2.1% of the population were living below the poverty line, including 0.0% of those under age 18 and 0.0% of those age 65 or over. About 64.6% of the population were employed, and 30.4% had a bachelor's degree or higher.
