= Kenwood Towne Centre =

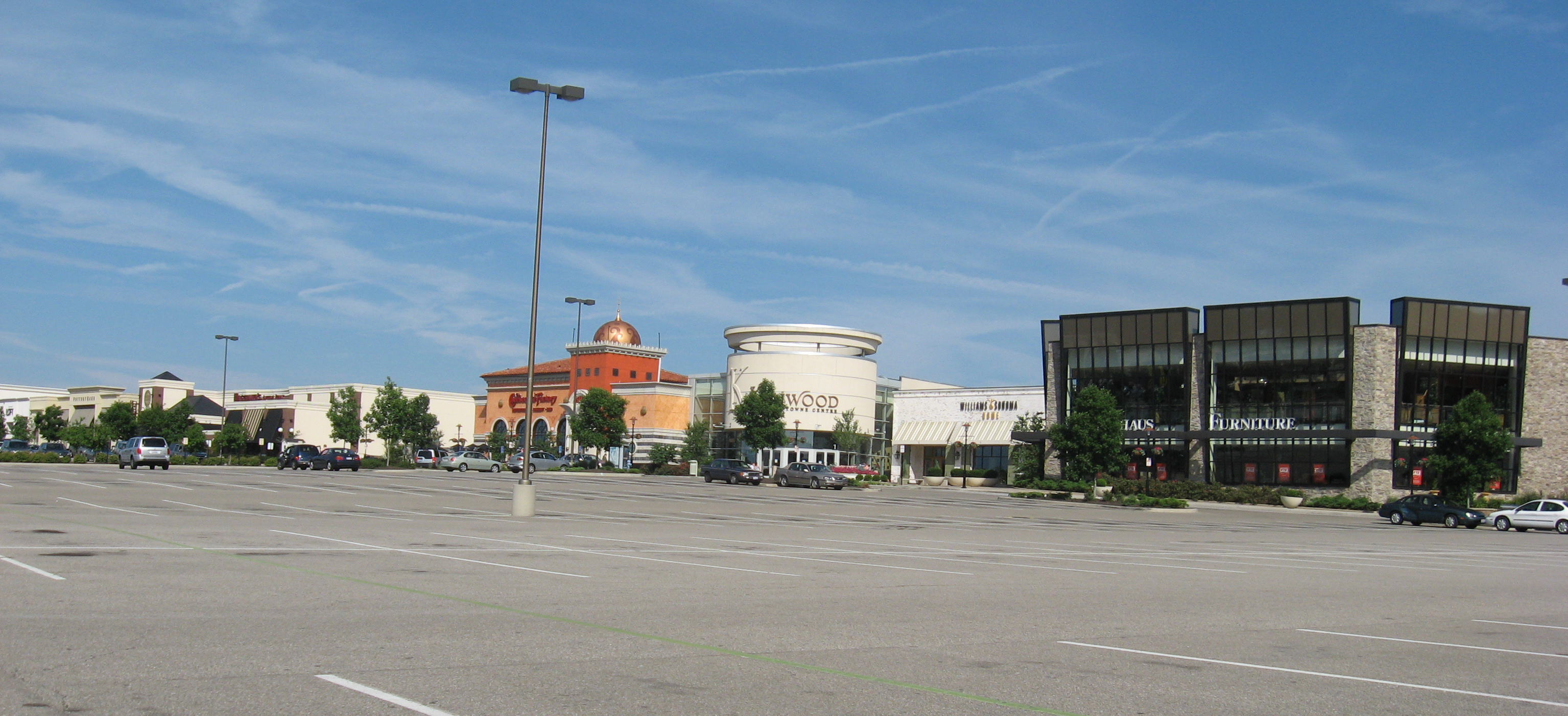
- Kenwood Towne Centre south storefront
- Location: Cincinnati, Ohio
- Coordinates: 39°12′08″N 84°22′38″W
- Opened: 1956 as Kenwood Plaza; 1987–1988, re-opened as Kenwood Towne Centre
- Developer: J.R. Williams (original); Western Development Corporation (1980s renovation)
- Manager: GGP
- Owner: GGP
- Num. of stores: 168
- Num. of anchor tenants: 3
- Floor area: 1,161,540 square feet (107,911 m^{2})
- Floors: 2 (3 in Dillard's)
- Public transit: Metro
- Website: www.kenwoodtownecentre.com

Kenwood Towne Centre is a shopping mall northeast of Cincinnati, at the corner of Montgomery and Kenwood Roads, adjacent to Interstate 71.

Anchor stores are Dillard's, Macy's, and Nordstrom.

== History ==
Originally known as Kenwood Plaza, the linear strip shopping center opened in 1956. At first, it was anchored only by Cincinnati-based McAlpin's. An H & S Pogue was in business by 1959. The PLAZA was situated on a 34-acre (140,000 m^{2}) tract, north of downtown Cincinnati. The site is not located inside a physical city limits, but lies within Sycamore Township, Hamilton County, Ohio, in an area commonly known as Kenwood, Ohio.

The original center underwent a major renovation in the late 1980s. The eastern half of the structure was razed. The western portion, and the two anchor stores, were incorporated into the first phase of a 100,000-square-foot (9,300 m^{2}), enclosed shopping mall. Renamed Kenwood Towne Centre, it opened in October 1987.

The second phase of the project involved the construction of a second, 450,000-square-foot (42,000 m^{2}) bi-level mall concourse, with Columbus-based Lazarus department store on its northern end completed in late 1988.

In 1983, Pogue's merged with their Indianapolis-based sister store L. S. Ayres and the store name changed accordingly. In 1988, L. S. Ayres closed all their Cincinnati locations. The Kenwood anchor was sold to JCPenney which closed in 1993. Birmingham, Alabama-based Parisian purchased the location in 1993. That store closed in February 2007 after Parisian was purchased by Belk of Charlotte, North Carolina.

The original McAlpin's anchor was renamed Dillard's in 1998 after McAlpin's parent, Mercantile Stores was bought by Dillard's. The Lazarus store, built during the 1988 renovation, was renamed Lazarus-Macy's in 2003. The store fully adopted the Macy's name in 2005.

In 2005, renovations expanded the Macy's to over 213,000 square feet (19,800 m^{2}), and added an adjacent, multi-level parking garage to the rear of the store. The entire south facade of the mall was expanded to create an exterior streetscape of restaurants and retail with more inviting entrance features, designed by local architecture and interior design firm FRCH Design Worldwide.

A remodeling in 2007 consisted of the razing of the former Pogue's/Parisian anchor (on the mall's southwest end). The store was replaced by a 2-level (140,000 square foot) Nordstrom department store that opened on September 25, 2009. An extension of the mall concourse designed by FRCH was created to access the new anchor.

In 2018, Macy's revealed that their Kenwood store was one of their "Growth 50" stores meaning that it is one of their highest performing locations nationwide. Because of this, the store received a series of renovations and improvements including new carpeting and paint as well as many other beneficial updates.

In 2019, Forever 21 filed for Chapter 11 bankruptcy and announced that they intend to close most Cincinnati area locations including the Kenwood store. However, an official closing date has not been determined or disclosed yet as of now and the store and the other announced closures in the metropolitan area remain open until further notice. The other area locations the company intends to shutter are the locations at Liberty Center, Dayton Mall, and their outlet location at the Tanger Outlets in Jeffersonville, Ohio.

During the 2019 holiday season, the mall implemented a youth escort policy/curfew in response to a fight in one of the mall's stores. The policy required teens ages 18 and under to be accompanied by an adult age 21 or older on December 27, 28, and 30 after 4 pm, December 29 and December 31 (New Year's Eve) after 2 pm. The curfew only applied to the 2019 season.
