= Reading High School (Ohio) =

Public high school in Reading, Ohio, United States

Reading Junior/Senior High School
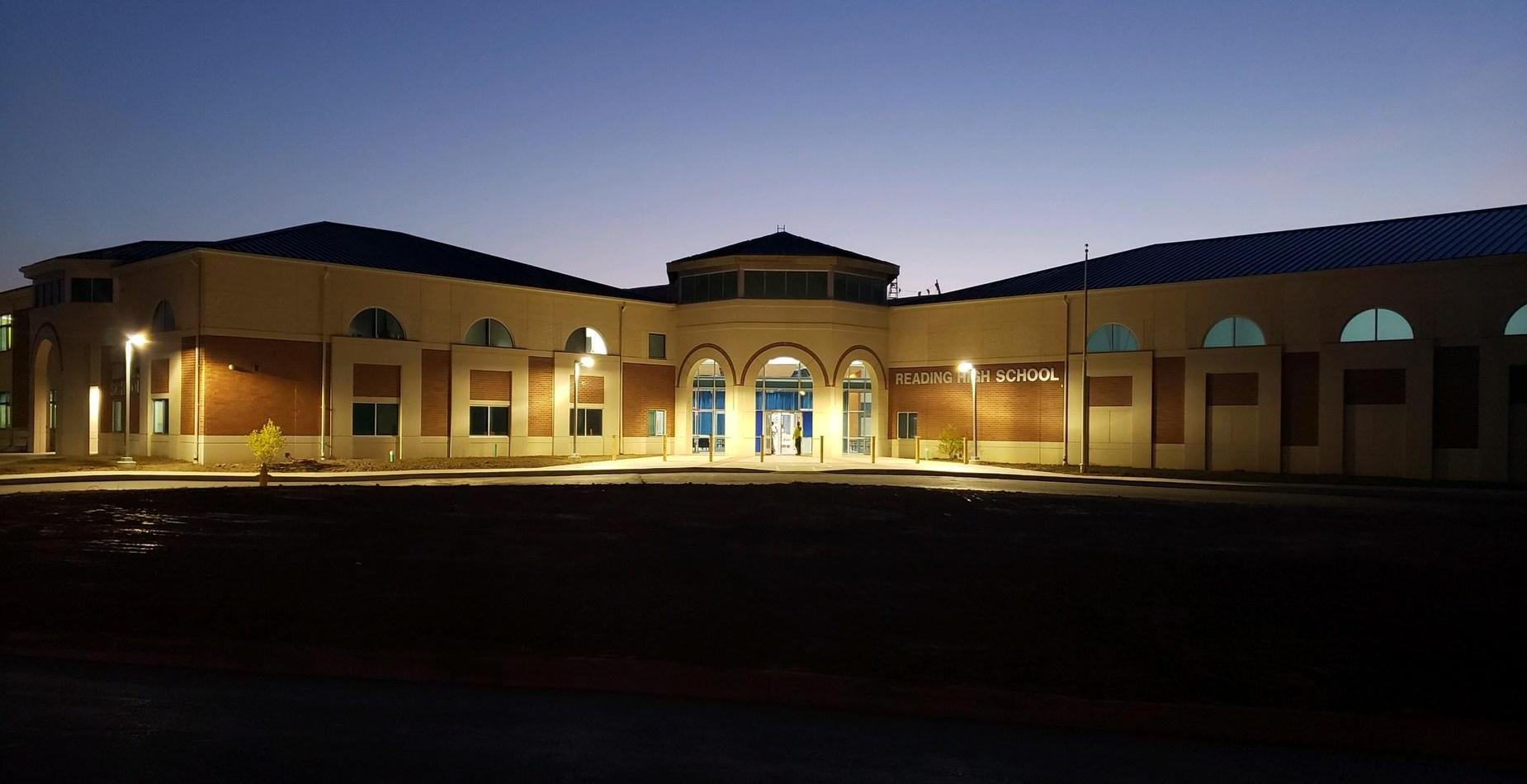
- Reading's New Building Under Construction

Location
- 810 Columbia Ave; Reading, Ohio, (Hamilton County) 45215; United States; 39°13′14″N 84°25′36″W

Information
- Type: Public high school
- Motto: Excellence in Education
- Status: Operational
- School district: Reading City School District
- Superintendent: Damon C Davis
- Principal: Michael Howton
- Teaching staff: 42.66 (FTE)
- Grades: 7–12
- Average class size: ~105 students per grade
- Student to teacher ratio: 15.61
- Colors: royal blue, Red and white
- Slogan: Excellence in Education
- Fight song: Reading Fight Song (Go Northwestern Go)
- Athletics conference: Cincinnati Hills League
- Sports: Football, baseball, soccer, golf, bowling, track and field, cross country, volleyball, and softball
- Mascot: Blue Devil
- Team name: Blue Devils
- Rival: Deer Park Wildcats
- Accreditation: North Central Association of Colleges and Schools
- Newspaper: Devil's Advocate
- Tuition: Free (Public)
- Website: readingschools.org

Reading Junior Senior High School is a public high school in Reading, Ohio, United States. It is the only public high school in the Reading Community City School District. Reading serves as a "Bedroom Community" approximately eight miles (13 km) from downtown Cincinnati, Ohio.

== Athletics ==
Reading teams are known as the Blue Devils. The Blue Devils are a long time member of the Cincinnati Hills League. The Devils share a deep rivalry with neighboring High School Deer Park.

=== Ohio High School Athletic Association State Championships ===
- Boys baseball – 1942, 1944, 1946, 1957, 1974, 1980
- Boys basketball – 2003
- Boys golf – 1949

== Notable alumni ==
- Claude Osteen- Former Major League Baseball pitcher who played 18 seasons mostly with the Los Angeles Dodgers.
- Brian O'Connor (pitcher)- Pittsburgh Pirates pitcher
- Tony Pike- Former UC Quarterback. Former member of the Carolina Panthers of the NFL.
- DeShawn Wynn- Former University of Florida Running Back. Member of the 2006 National Champion Gator Football Team.
- Darrell Pace- 1976 and 1984 Olympic Gold Medalist- Archery
- Steve Engel- Former MLB player (Chicago Cubs)
- Daniel Von Bargen - Actor (featured in Seinfeld, Super Troopers and Malcolm in the Middle)
