= Kenwood, Ohio =

- Census-designated place
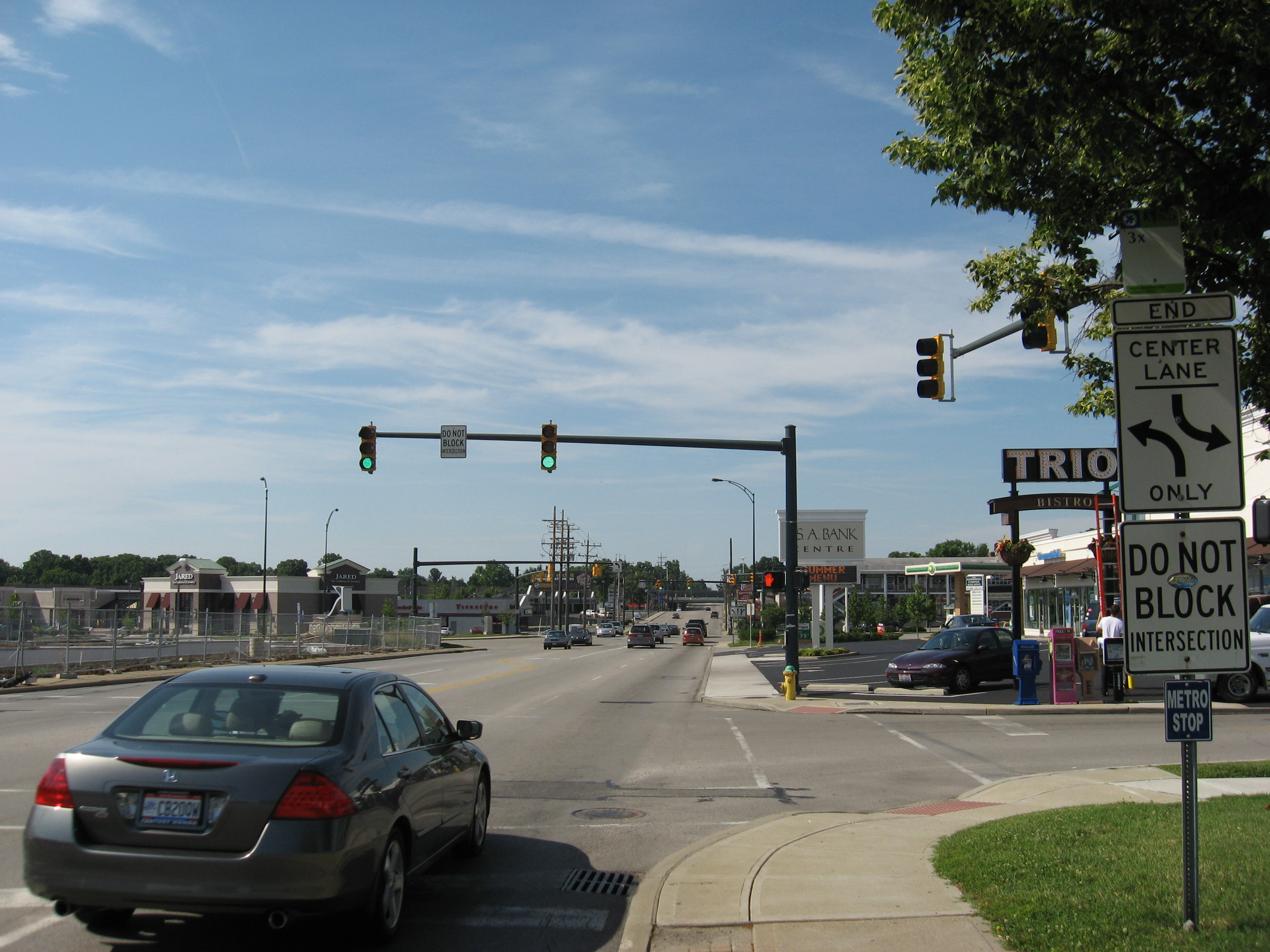
- Downtown Kenwood

- Location in Hamilton County and the state of Ohio.
- Coordinates: 39°12′30″N 84°22′20″W
- Country: United States
- State: Ohio
- County: Hamilton

Area
  - Total: 2.42 sq mi (6.26 km^{2})
  - Land: 2.42 sq mi (6.26 km^{2})
  - Water: 0 sq mi (0.00 km^{2})
- Elevation: 794 ft (242 m)

Population (2020)
  - Total: 7,570
  - Density: 3,133.7/sq mi (1,209.94/km^{2})
- Time zone: UTC-5 (Eastern (EST))
  - Summer (DST): UTC-4 (EDT)
- ZIP code: 45236
- Area code: 513
- FIPS code: 39-39914
- GNIS feature ID: 2393069

Kenwood is a census-designated place (CDP) in Sycamore Township, Hamilton County, Ohio, United States. The population was 7,570 at the 2020 census. It is a major shopping destination for the Cincinnati area, featuring properties such as Kenwood Towne Centre and The Kenwood Collection.

== Geography ==
According to the United States Census Bureau, the CDP has a total area of 2.3 square miles (6.0 km^{2}), all land.

== Demographics ==
Historical population
Census	Pop.	Note	%±
2020	7,570		—
U.S. Decennial Census

=== 2020 census ===
As of the census of 2020, there were 7,570 people living in the CDP, for a population density of 3,133.28 people per square mile (1,209.94/km^{2}). There were 3,354 housing units. The racial makeup of the CDP was 77.4% White, 6.8% Black or African American, 0.0% Native American, 9.0% Asian, 0.0% Pacific Islander, 1.3% from some other race, and 5.5% from two or more races. 3.6% of the population were Hispanic or Latino of any race.

There were 3,463 households, out of which 31.8% had children under the age of 18 living with them, 50.3% were married couples living together, 19.6% had a male householder with no spouse present, and 25.5% had a female householder with no spouse present. 28.9% of all households were made up of individuals, and 16.0% were someone living alone who was 65 years of age or older. The average household size was 2.25, and the average family size was 2.80.

21.2% of the CDP's population were under the age of 18, 54.2% were 18 to 64, and 24.6% were 65 years of age or older. The median age was 42.7. For every 100 females, there were 97.1 males.

According to the U.S. Census American Community Survey, for the period 2016-2020 the estimated median annual income for a household in the CDP was $95,590, and the median income for a family was $122,321. About 2.5% of the population were living below the poverty line, including 0.0% of those under age 18 and 4.9% of those age 65 or over. About 61.5% of the population were employed, and 65.8% had a bachelor's degree or higher.

=== 2000 census ===
At the 2000 census there were 7,423 people, 3,305 households, and 1,953 families in the CDP. The population density was 3,182.3 inhabitants per square mile (1,228.7/km^{2}). There were 3,478 housing units at an average density of 1,491.0 per square mile (575.7/km^{2}). The racial makeup of the CDP was 89.14% White, 5.11% African American, 0.09% Native American, 4.76% Asian, 0.34% from other races, and 0.57% from two or more races. Hispanic or Latino of any race were 1.76%.

Of the 3,305 households 25.9% had children under the age of 18 living with them, 49.7% were married couples living together, 7.4% had a female householder with no husband present, and 40.9% were non-families. 38.3% of households were one person and 23.0% were one person aged 65 or older. The average household size was 2.18 and the average family size was 2.93.

The age distribution was 22.0% under the age of 18, 4.4% from 18 to 24, 23.1% from 25 to 44, 22.3% from 45 to 64, and 28.2% 65 or older. The median age was 45 years. For every 100 females, there were 79.3 males. For every 100 females age 18 and over, there were 74.1 males.

The median household income was $53,300 and the median family income was $74,511. Males had a median income of $55,699 versus $35,885 for females. The per capita income for the CDP was $32,458. About 1.6% of families and 3.3% of the population were below the poverty line, including 1.4% of those under age 18 and 4.9% of those age 65 or over.
