= Sycamore Township, Hamilton County, Ohio =

Township in Ohio, US

- Township
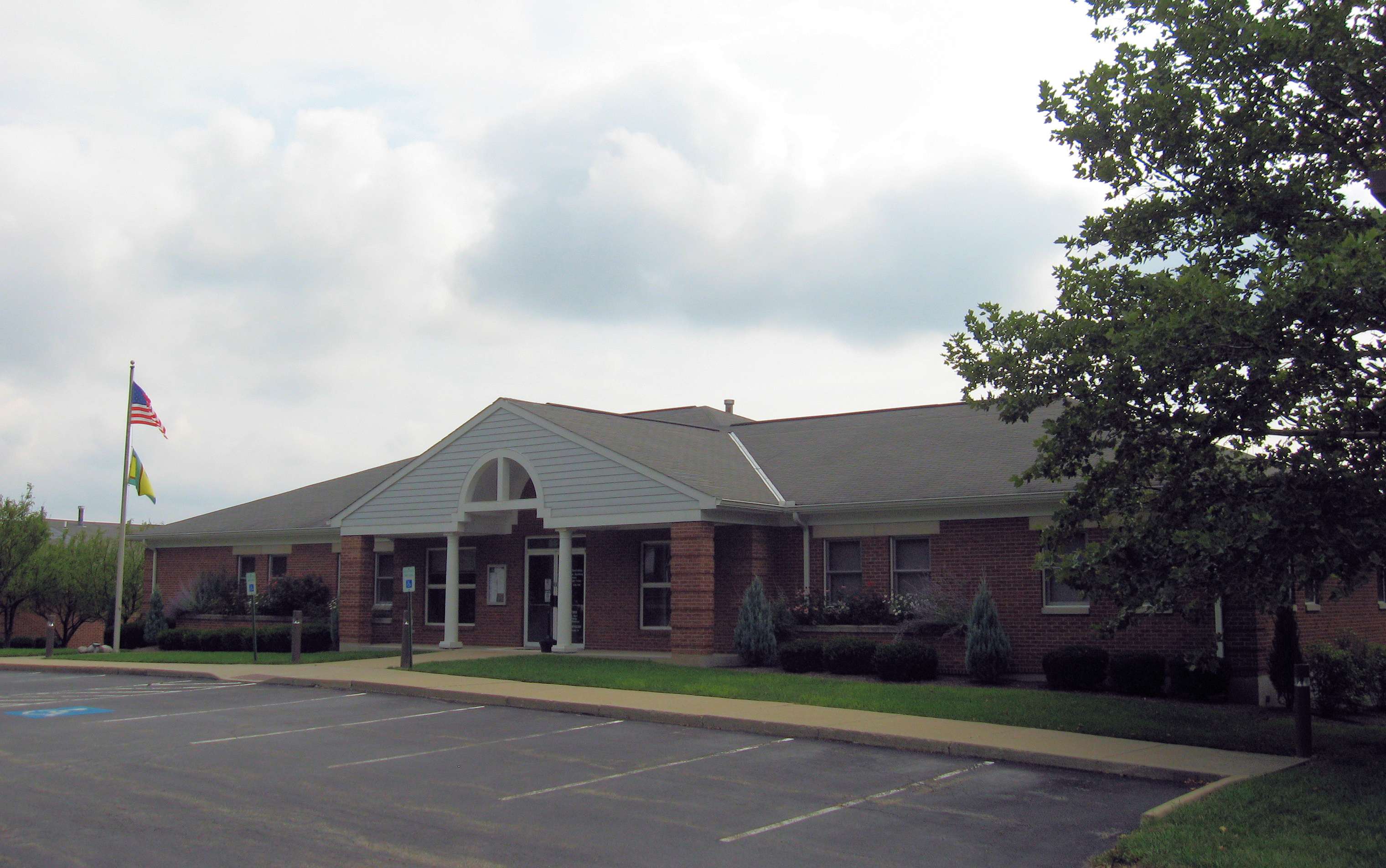
- Township government building

- Flag Logo
- Motto: "There's more in Sycamore!"
- Location in Hamilton County and the state of Ohio.
- Coordinates: 39°12′48″N 84°22′42″W
- Country: United States
- State: Ohio
- County: Hamilton

Area
  - Total: 6.8 sq mi (17.5 km^{2})
  - Land: 6.8 sq mi (17.5 km^{2})
  - Water: 0 sq mi (0.0 km^{2})
- Elevation: 820 ft (250 m)

Population (2020)
  - Total: 19,563
  - Density: 2,895.3/sq mi (1,117.89/km^{2})
- Time zone: UTC-5 (Eastern (EST))
  - Summer (DST): UTC-4 (EDT)
- ZIP code: 45236
- Area code: 513
- FIPS code: 39-75973
- GNIS feature ID: 1086231
- Website: www.sycamoretownship.org

Sycamore Township is one of the twelve townships of Hamilton County, Ohio, United States. The population was 19,563 as of the 2020 census. Sycamore Township lies approximately 12 miles (19 km) north of Cincinnati, and is part of the Cincinnati metropolitan area.

== Name and history ==
Sycamore Township was established in 1803 by an order of the Court of Common Pleas. Its boundaries were revised in 1822 to reflect the organization of Symmes Township.

Statewide, the only other Sycamore Township is located in Wyandot County.

== Geography ==
Located in the northern part of the county, the township has been cut into three "islands" by annexations. They have the following borders:

- The northern island:
  - Deerfield Township, Warren County - north
  - Symmes Township - east
  - Montgomery - south
  - Blue Ash - southwest
  - Sharonville - west
  - West Chester Township, Butler County - northwest
- The southeastern island:
  - Blue Ash - directly north
  - Montgomery - northeast
  - Indian Hill - east
  - Madeira - southeast
  - Columbia Township - southwest, east of Silverton
  - Silverton - southwest, west of Columbia Township and south of Deer Park
  - Deer Park - southwest, north of Silverton
  - Amberley - west
  - Reading - northwest
- The western island:
  - Reading - northeast
  - Cincinnati - southwest
  - Arlington Heights - northwest

Most of the township has been annexed by the various municipalities that the islands border. The central (or southeastern) "island" of Sycamore Township is occupied by the census-designated places (CDPs) of Dillonvale, Rossmoyne, Kenwood, and Concorde Hills, from west to east. Much of the northern "island" is occupied by the CDPs of Highpoint (north) and Brecon (south).

== Demographics ==
Historical population
Census	Pop.	Note	%±
1820	3,463		—
1850	3,731		—
1860	3,427		−8.1%
1870	5,460		59.3%
1880	6,369		16.6%
1890	7,460		17.1%
1900	8,453		13.3%
1910	9,934		17.5%
1920	12,771		28.6%
1930	20,172		58.0%
1940	22,636		12.2%
1950	28,229		24.7%
1960	54,943		94.6%
1970	31,088		−43.4%
1980	29,141		−6.3%
1990	20,074		−31.1%
2000	19,675		−2.0%
2010	19,200		−2.4%
2020	19,563		1.9%

=== 2020 census ===
As of the census of 2020, there were 19,563 people living in the township, for a population density of 2,919.9 people per square mile (1117.9/km^{2}). There were 8,693 housing units. The racial makeup of the township was 75.2% White, 6.9% Black or African American, 0.2% Native American, 8.1% Asian, 1.0% Pacific Islander, 2.8% from some other race, and 5.9% from two or more races. 5.4% of the population were Hispanic or Latino of any race.

There were 8,371 households, out of which 27.1% had children under the age of 18 living with them, 49.7% were married couples living together, 19.9% had a male householder with no spouse present, and 24.1% had a female householder with no spouse present. 41.0% of all households were made up of individuals, and 16.2% were someone living alone who was 65 years of age or older. The average household size was 2.28, and the average family size was 2.95.

20.2% of the township's population were under the age of 18, 57.6% were 18 to 64, and 22.2% were 65 years of age or older. The median age was 42.5. For every 100 females, there were 97.8 males.

According to the U.S. Census American Community Survey, for the period 2016-2020 the estimated median annual income for a household in the township was $82,257, and the median income for a family was $106,392. About 5.0% of the population were living below the poverty line, including 5.0% of those under age 18 and 3.8% of those age 65 or over. About 60.8% of the population were employed, and 55.1% had a bachelor's degree or higher.

== Government ==
Like other townships in Ohio, Sycamore Township is governed by a three-member board of trustees, who are elected in November of odd-numbered years to a four-year term beginning on the following January 1. Two are elected in the year after the presidential election and one is elected in the year before it. There is also an elected township fiscal officer, who serves a four-year term beginning on April 1 of the year after the election, which is held in November of the year before the presidential election. Vacancies in the fiscal officership or on the board of trustees are filled by the remaining trustees.

The township adopted a limited home rule form of government in 1993.
