= Dillonvale, Hamilton County, Ohio =

Dillonvale, Ohio
- Census-designated place
- Location in Hamilton County and the state of Ohio.
- Coordinates: 39°13′02″N 84°24′11″W
- Country: United States
- State: Ohio
- County: Hamilton

Area
  - Total: 0.89 sq mi (2.31 km^{2})
  - Land: 0.89 sq mi (2.31 km^{2})
  - Water: 0 sq mi (0.00 km^{2})
- Elevation: 755 ft (230 m)

Population (2020)
  - Total: 3,436
  - Density: 3,851.0/sq mi (1,486.87/km^{2})
- Time zone: UTC-5 (Eastern (EST))
  - Summer (DST): UTC-4 (EDT)
- FIPS code: 39-22008
- GNIS feature ID: 2393397

Dillonvale is a census-designated place (CDP) in Sycamore Township, Hamilton County, Ohio, United States. The population was 3,436 at the 2020 census.

== History ==
Dillonvale started as a housing subdivision planned and built by Dillon Builders in the 1940s.

== Geography ==
According to the United States Census Bureau, the CDP has a total area of 0.89 square miles (2.3 km^{2}), all land.

== Demographics ==
=== 2020 census ===
As of the census of 2020, there were 3,436 people living in the CDP, for a population density of 3,852.02 people per square mile (1,486.87/km^{2}). There were 1,638 housing units. The racial makeup of the CDP was 87.7% White, 3.5% Black or African American, 0.3% Native American, 2.2% Asian, 0.0% Pacific Islander, 0.7% from some other race, and 5.6% from two or more races. 2.7% of the population were Hispanic or Latino of any race.

There were 1,512 households, out of which 25.5% had children under the age of 18 living with them, 50.6% were married couples living together, 24.1% had a male householder with no spouse present, and 21.0% had a female householder with no spouse present. 39.3% of all households were made up of individuals, and 16.0% were someone living alone who was 65 years of age or older. The average household size was 2.22, and the average family size was 3.04.

18.3% of the CDP's population were under the age of 18, 62.8% were 18 to 64, and 18.9% were 65 years of age or older. The median age was 42.2. For every 100 females, there were 103.3 males.

According to the U.S. Census American Community Survey, for the period 2016-2020 the estimated median annual income for a household in the CDP was $70,400, and the median income for a family was $94,076. About 3.6% of the population were living below the poverty line, including 0.0% of those under age 18 and 5.2% of those age 65 or over. About 61.8% of the population were employed, and 38.6% had a bachelor's degree or higher.

=== 2000 census ===
At the 2000 census there were 3,716 people, 1,612 households, and 1,081 families living in the CDP. The population density was 4,118.2 inhabitants per square mile (1,590.0/km^{2}). There were 1,636 housing units at an average density of 1,813.1 per square mile (700.0/km^{2}). The racial makeup of the CDP was 96.23% White, 1.61% African American, 0.24% Native American, 0.40% Asian, 0.05% Pacific Islander, 0.38% from other races, and 1.08% from two or more races. Hispanic or Latino of any race were 1.00%.

Of the 1,612 households 26.3% had children under the age of 18 living with them, 54.5% were married couples living together, 10.0% had a female householder with no husband present, and 32.9% were non-families. 29.8% of households were one person and 15.9% were one person aged 65 or older. The average household size was 2.31 and the average family size was 2.86.

The age distribution was 21.1% under the age of 18, 6.0% from 18 to 24, 28.1% from 25 to 44, 21.4% from 45 to 64, and 23.3% 65 or older. The median age was 42 years. For every 100 females, there were 88.1 males. For every 100 females age 18 and over, there were 84.9 males.

The median household income was $45,307 and the median family income was $52,041. Males had a median income of $42,171 versus $26,357 for females. The per capita income for the CDP was $21,553. About 2.8% of families and 3.8% of the population were below the poverty line, including 2.7% of those under age 18 and 2.8% of those age 65 or over.
