= Deer Park, Ohio =

- City
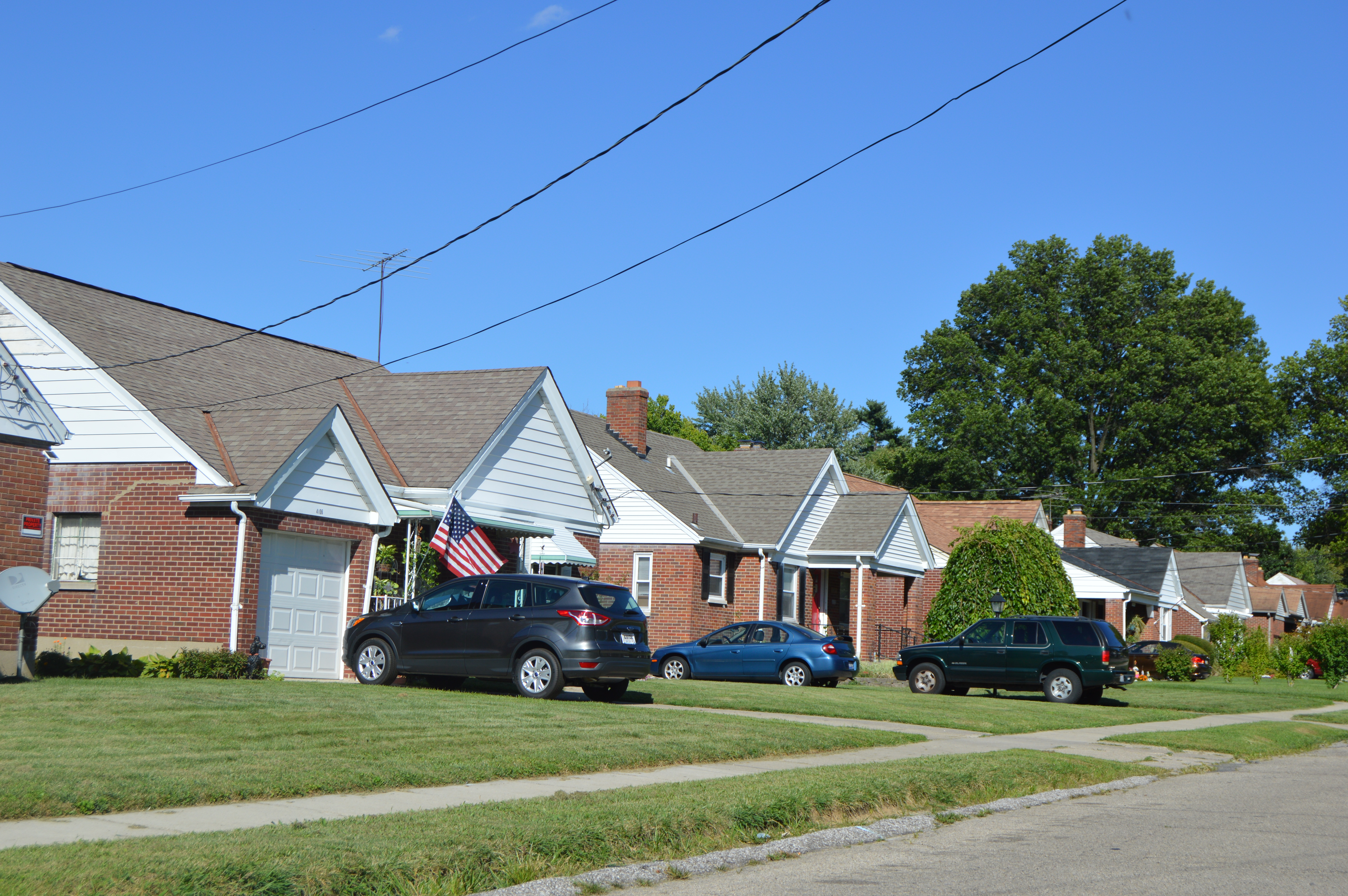
- Houses on Orchard Lane

- Flag Logo
- Motto: "Deer Park, The Right Town for a Bright Future"
- Interactive map of Deer Park, Ohio
- Location within Ohio Location within the United States
- Coordinates: 39°12′14″N 84°23′52″W
- Country: United States
- State: Ohio
- County: Hamilton

Government
  - Mayor: John Donnellon (R)

Area
  - Total: 0.85 sq mi (2.21 km^{2})
  - Land: 0.85 sq mi (2.21 km^{2})
  - Water: 0 sq mi (0.00 km^{2})
- Elevation: 850 ft (260 m)

Population (2020)
  - Total: 5,432
  - Estimate (2023): 5,336
  - Density: 6,363.0/sq mi (2,456.77/km^{2})
- Time zone: UTC-5 (Eastern (EST))
  - Summer (DST): UTC-4 (EDT)
- ZIP code: 45236
- Area code: 513
- FIPS code: 39-21266
- GNIS feature ID: 1086205
- Website: www.deerpark-oh.gov

Deer Park is a city in Hamilton County, Ohio, United States. It is a suburb of Cincinnati. The population was 5,432 at the 2020 census.

== History ==
The Cincinnati, Lebanon and Northern Railway began running through the town in 1881, along the "Highland Route". In 1795, following the signing of the Treaty of Greenville which provided assurances to Ohio settlers that they would be protected from Indian "intrusions", Samuel and Rebecca DeMent Pierson established the first log home in the area near Deer Park.

In 1894, Deer Park was described as having one store and a Catholic church.

The community was incorporated in 1912.

== Geography ==
According to the United States Census Bureau, the city has a total area of 0.87 square miles (2.25 km^{2}), all land.

== Demographics ==
Historical population
Census	Pop.	Note	%±
1920	824		—
1930	2,642		220.6%
1940	3,510		32.9%
1950	7,241		106.3%
1960	8,423		16.3%
1970	7,415		−12.0%
1980	6,745		−9.0%
1990	6,181		−8.4%
2000	5,982		−3.2%
2010	5,736		−4.1%
2020	5,432		−5.3%
2023 (est.)	5,336		−1.8%

=== 2020 census ===
As of the 2020 census, Deer Park had a population of 5,432. The median age was 38.0 years. 17.8% of residents were under the age of 18 and 16.3% of residents were 65 years of age or older. For every 100 females there were 94.2 males, and for every 100 females age 18 and over there were 93.0 males age 18 and over.

100.0% of residents lived in urban areas, while 0.0% lived in rural areas.

There were 2,556 households in Deer Park, of which 21.8% had children under the age of 18 living in them. Of all households, 36.5% were married-couple households, 22.6% were households with a male householder and no spouse or partner present, and 31.5% were households with a female householder and no spouse or partner present. About 38.8% of all households were made up of individuals and 13.9% had someone living alone who was 65 years of age or older.

There were 2,745 housing units, of which 6.9% were vacant. The homeowner vacancy rate was 1.1% and the rental vacancy rate was 11.8%.

Racial composition as of the 2020 census
Race	Number	Percent
White	4,601	84.7%
Black or African American	314	5.8%
American Indian and Alaska Native	12	0.2%
Asian	119	2.2%
Native Hawaiian and Other Pacific Islander	5	0.1%
Some other race	82	1.5%
Two or more races	299	5.5%
Hispanic or Latino (of any race)	169	3.1%

=== 2010 census ===
As of the census of 2010, there were 5,736 people, 2,618 households, and 1,398 families living in the city. The population density was 6,593.1 inhabitants per square mile (2,545.6/km^{2}). There were 2,784 housing units at an average density of 3,200.0 per square mile (1,235.5/km^{2}). The racial makeup of the city was 91.9% White, 4.6% African American, 0.1% Native American, 1.3% Asian, 0.6% from other races, and 1.5% from two or more races. Hispanic or Latino of any race were 1.7% of the population.

There were 2,618 households, of which 24.7% had children under the age of 18 living with them, 39.1% were married couples living together, 9.9% had a female householder with no husband present, 4.4% had a male householder with no wife present, and 46.6% were non-families. 39.5% of all households were made up of individuals, and 13.4% had someone living alone who was 65 years of age or older. The average household size was 2.12 and the average family size was 2.86.

The median age in the city was 38.5 years. 18.8% of residents were under the age of 18; 7.4% were between the ages of 18 and 24; 31.8% were from 25 to 44; 26.1% were from 45 to 64; and 15.8% were 65 years of age or older. The gender makeup of the city was 47.4% male and 52.6% female.

=== 2000 census ===
As of the census of 2000, there were 5,982 people, 2,634 households, and 1,496 families living in the city. The population density was 6,979.0 inhabitants per square mile (2,694.6/km^{2}). There were 2,723 housing units at an average density of 3,176.8 per square mile (1,226.6/km^{2}). The racial makeup of the city was 96.52% White, 1.69% African American, 0.18% Native American, 0.69% Asian, 0.22% from other races, and 0.70% from two or more races. Hispanic or Latino of any race were 0.67% of the population.

There were 2,634 households, out of which 25.7% had children under the age of 18 living with them, 43.0% were married couples living together, 9.8% had a female householder with no husband present, and 43.2% were non-families. 39.1% of all households were made up of individuals, and 16.5% had someone living alone who was 65 years of age or older. The average household size was 2.18 and the average family size was 2.94.

In the city the population was spread out, with 21.8% under the age of 18, 6.3% from 18 to 24, 32.7% from 25 to 44, 18.9% from 45 to 64, and 20.3% who were 65 years of age or older. The median age was 38 years. For every 100 females, there were 86.1 males. For every 100 females age 18 and over, there were 79.8 males.

The median income for a household in the city was $39,692, and the median income for a family was $45,585. Males had a median income of $36,753 versus $28,706 for females. The per capita income for the city was $22,274. About 3.7% of families and 5.3% of the population were below the poverty line, including 4.8% of those under age 18 and 10.8% of those age 65 or over.

== Education ==
The city of Deer Park is served by the Deer Park City School District which serves the city and surrounding area. The district has 1 elementary (Amity Elementary) and 1 High School (Deer Park Junior/Senior High School)

== Notable person ==
- Bill Cunningham, conservative radio personality
