= Lincoln Heights, Ohio =

- Village
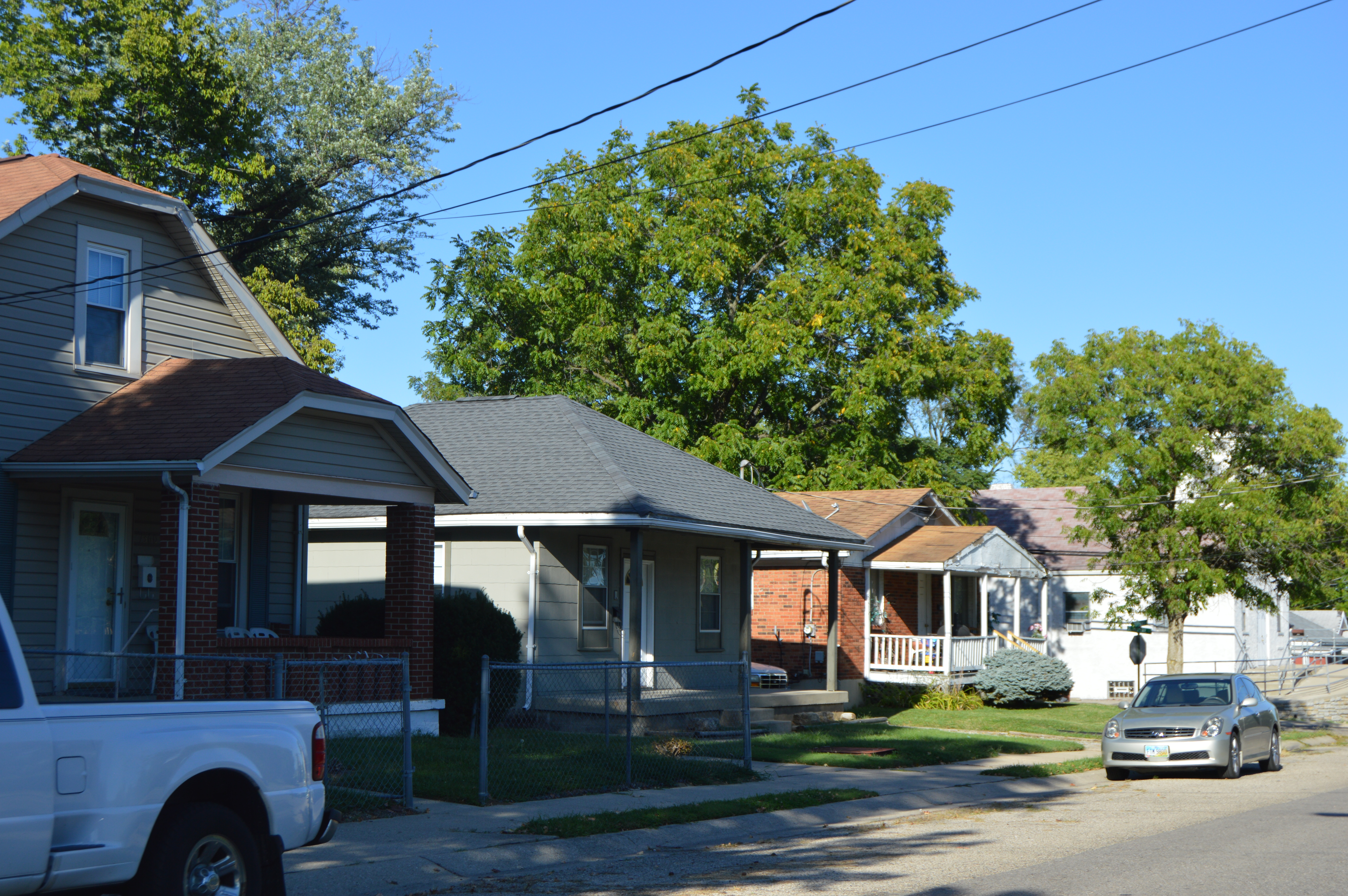
- Houses on Steffen Avenue

- Location in Hamilton County and the state of Ohio.
- Coordinates: 39°14′41″N 84°27′24″W
- Country: United States
- State: Ohio
- County: Hamilton

Government
  - Mayor: Ruby Kinsey-Mumphrey

Area
  - Total: 0.74 sq mi (1.92 km^{2})
  - Land: 0.74 sq mi (1.92 km^{2})
  - Water: 0 sq mi (0.00 km^{2})
- Elevation: 669 ft (204 m)

Population (2020)
  - Total: 3,144
  - Density: 4,230.6/sq mi (1,633.46/km^{2})
- Time zone: UTC-5 (Eastern (EST))
  - Summer (DST): UTC-4 (EDT)
- ZIP code: 45215
- Area code: 513
- FIPS code: 39-43722
- GNIS feature ID: 1086215
- Website: www.vlho.org

Lincoln Heights is a village in Hamilton County, Ohio, United States. The population was 3,144 at the 2020 census. It is a suburb of Cincinnati.

== History ==
Lincoln Heights was founded in the 1920s by property developers as a suburban enclave for black homeowners working in nearby industries. It was originally an unincorporated area which had no fire, police, streetlights, or paved roads. At the time, only some houses had electricity. Many black families bought houses in the community because zoning laws and redlining prevented them from purchasing property in other communities. It incorporated in 1946 and elected Reverend Michael J. Mangham as mayor, one of the earliest African mayors in the North.

=== Incorporation attempts ===
The first attempt at incorporation came in 1939; the motive was so residents could establish their own municipal services. Lockland residents objected to the Lincoln Heights incorporation proposal because they feared Lincoln Heights' business district may compete with its own, so they filed an objection several minutes before the filing deadline occurred. This was the start of a series of delays.

Kitty Morgan of Cincinnati Magazine wrote that the Hamilton County and state governments were "unsympathetic" to the attempted incorporation. The manager of the Wright Aeronautical Plant, located on land that Lincoln Heights residents wished to incorporate, also filed an objection because he did not want the factory to be in a majority black municipality. The communities of Woodlawn, and then Evendale incorporated even though Lincoln Heights' application kept being delayed. They respectively took the western and eastern portions of territory that was supposed to be in Lincoln Heights, the latter of which contained the aeronautical plant (now the GE Aviation Evendale plant). The persons trying to establish Lincoln Heights failed to successfully challenge the Evendale incorporation in court.

Voters narrowly approved the incorporation of Lincoln Heights in a special election on June 18, 1941. At the time, African Americans made up 98% of the community's residents. In 1946, Hamilton County allowed Lincoln Heights to incorporate with 10% of the original proposal's area. It had no industrial tax base since there were no major factories or plants within the city limits. A University of Buffalo professor of urban and regional planning who wrote a dissertation on Lincoln Heights, Henry Louis Taylor, stated that this made Lincoln Heights vulnerable to future economic problems.

=== Subsequent history ===
Morgan wrote that the "halcyon days" of Lincoln Heights were the post-World War II period through the 1960s. At that time of incorporation it was the only black municipality north of the Mason-Dixon line, prompting Governor of New York Thomas E. Dewey to establish a tour of Lincoln Heights, inviting New York City residents to participate. In the mid-20th century many Lincoln Heights residents worked at the Wright Aeronautical Plant and a nearby chemical plant.

In the 1970s Lincoln Heights had 6,099 residents. In the 1970s and 1980s many factories began to close, and the tax base of the city decreased, making it difficult to establish community programs. It became difficult for residents find employment, and many residents who attended universities never returned to the city. By 1990 the number of residents in Lincoln Heights had decreased to 4,805. This further declined to 4,113 persons in 2000. In 2000 Cincinnati Magazine ranked Lincoln Heights in last place, #84, in its "The Best Places to Live," a ranking of communities in the Cincinnati area.

As of 2001 the community still included many longtime residents; many persons who stayed in the city had been unable to leave Lincoln Heights. That year the Lincoln Heights economic development director, Claude Audley, stated that he received telephone calls from people expressing a wish to move back to Lincoln Heights.

From 2007 to 2013 the values of houses in Lincoln Heights declined by 76.4%. During the same period the housing values in nearby Indian Hill increased by 27.7%.

In 2013 the population was down to 3,367. From 1970 to 2013, therefore, the population had declined by 45%. The population in nearby Blue Ash had increased by 46% during that time frame.

=== 2025 neo-Nazi demonstrations ===
In February 2025, about a dozen neo-Nazis waving flags with swastikas, some also armed, gathered at a highway overpass on the border between Lincoln Heights and Evendale, Ohio. The group pinned swastika banners and a sign that read "America is for the White Man" on the overpass, and at one point yelled out the n-word towards a passing white driver who filmed them. Local residents of the mostly-black Lincoln Heights confronted the neo-Nazi group and within minutes the latter fled in a U-Haul truck while local police stood between them and members of the community. Residents reported that the neo-Nazis used anti-black racial slurs and criticized police for not preventing the incident and not tracking or detaining the instigators, perceiving bias in police treatment and protection of the neo-Nazis. Cincinnati Mayor Aftab Pureval released a statement condemning the incident and said it was "shocking and disgusting to see swastikas displayed in Evendale today." In the following days, counterdemonstrations and vigils were held, with hundreds of locals participating. Some residents also formed armed patrols of the neighborhood.

== Geography ==
According to the United States Census Bureau, the village has a total area of 0.76 square miles (1.97 km^{2}), all land.

As of 2002 there were 19 churches within Lincoln Heights.

== Demographics ==
Historical population
Census	Pop.	Note	%±
1950	5,531		—
1960	7,798		41.0%
1970	6,099		−21.8%
1980	5,259		−13.8%
1990	4,805		−8.6%
2000	4,113		−14.4%
2010	3,286		−20.1%
2020	3,144		−4.3%
U.S. Decennial Census

=== Racial and ethnic composition ===
Lincoln Heights village, Ohio – Racial and ethnic composition Note: the US Census treats Hispanic/Latino as an ethnic category. This table excludes Latinos from the racial categories and assigns them to a separate category. Hispanics/Latinos may be of any race.
Race / Ethnicity (NH = Non-Hispanic)	Pop 2000	Pop 2010	Pop 2020	% 2000	% 2010	% 2020
White alone (NH)	23	50	92	0.56%	1.52%	2.93%
Black or African American alone (NH)	4,011	3,132	2,810	97.52%	95.31%	89.38%
Native American or Alaska Native alone (NH)	4	11	1	0.10%	0.33%	0.03%
Asian alone (NH)	1	1	6	0.02%	0.03%	0.19%
Native Hawaiian or Pacific Islander alone (NH)	1	5	0	0.02%	0.15%	0.00%
Other race alone (NH)	6	8	14	0.15%	0.24%	0.45%
Mixed race or Multiracial (NH)	32	62	127	0.78%	1.89%	4.04%
Hispanic or Latino (any race)	35	17	94	0.85%	0.52%	2.99%
Total	4,113	3,286	3,144	100.00%	100.00%	100.00%

=== 2020 census ===
As of the 2020 census, Lincoln Heights had a population of 3,144. The population density was 4,231.49 people per square mile (1,633.46/km^{2}).

100.0% of residents lived in urban areas, while 0.0% lived in rural areas.

There were 1,262 households, of which 34.1% had children under the age of 18 living in them. Of all households, 15.8% were married-couple households, 19.9% were households with a male householder and no spouse or partner present, and 59.0% were households with a female householder and no spouse or partner present. About 35.3% of all households were made up of individuals, and 16.7% had someone living alone who was 65 years of age or older. The average household size was 2.48, and the average family size was 3.20.

There were 1,456 housing units, of which 13.3% were vacant. The homeowner vacancy rate was 2.2% and the rental vacancy rate was 8.7%.

The median age was 33.2 years. 31.1% of residents were under the age of 18 and 15.6% were 65 years of age or older. For every 100 females, there were 74.8 males, and for every 100 females age 18 and over, there were 66.4 males age 18 and over.

=== Income and poverty ===
According to the U.S. Census American Community Survey, for the period 2016-2020 the estimated median annual income for a household in the village was $12,183. About 64.4% of the population were living below the poverty line, including 91.2% of those under age 18 and 38.6% of those age 65 or over. About 35.9% of the population were employed, and 12.0% had a bachelor's degree or higher.

=== 2010 census ===
As of the census of 2010, there were 3,286 people, 1,287 households, and 803 families residing in the village. The population density was 4,323.7 inhabitants per square mile (1,669.4/km^{2}). There were 1,564 housing units at an average density of 2,057.9 per square mile (794.6/km^{2}). The racial makeup of the village was 1.7% White, 95.5% African American, 0.3% Native American, 0.2% Pacific Islander, 0.3% from other races, and 2.0% from two or more races. Hispanic or Latino of any race were 0.5% of the population.

There were 1,287 households, of which 36.5% had children under the age of 18 living with them, 17.0% were married couples living together, 39.0% had a female householder with no husband present, 6.4% had a male householder with no wife present, and 37.6% were non-families. 34.7% of all households were made up of individuals, and 12.6% had someone living alone who was 65 years of age or older. The average household size was 2.55 and the average family size was 3.30.

The median age in the village was 31.9 years. 30.6% of residents were under the age of 18; 11.9% were between the ages of 18 and 24; 20.2% were from 25 to 44; 25% were from 45 to 64; and 12.2% were 65 years of age or older. The gender makeup of the village was 43.3% male and 56.7% female.

As of 2015 the percentage of African-Americans in Lincoln Heights is among the highest in Ohio. As of the same time nearby Blue Ash has more than twice the median income of Lincoln Heights.

=== 2000 census ===
As of the census of 2000, there were 4,113 people, 1,593 households, and 1,062 families residing in the village. The population density was 5,566.1 inhabitants per square mile (2,149.1/km^{2}). There were 1,762 housing units at an average density of 2,384.5 per square mile (920.7/km^{2}). The racial makeup of the village was 97.86% African American, 0.95% White, 0.10% Native American, 0.02% Asian, 0.02% Pacific Islander, 0.17% from other races, and 0.88% from two or more races. Hispanic or Latino of any race were 0.85% of the population.

There were 1,593 households, out of which 35.4% had children under the age of 18 living with them, 21.6% were married couples living together, 40.6% had a female householder with no husband present, and 33.3% were non-families. 30.6% of all households were made up of individuals, and 12.7% had someone living alone who was 65 years of age or older. The average household size was 2.58 and the average family size was 3.21.

In the village, the population was spread out, with 34.2% under the age of 18, 9.5% from 18 to 24, 24.8% from 25 to 44, 18.8% from 45 to 64, and 12.6% who were 65 years of age or older. The median age was 31 years. For every 100 females there were 74.0 males. For every 100 females age 18 and over, there were 99.3 males.

The median income for a household in the village was $19,834, and the median income for a family was $22,500. Males had a median income of $24,050 versus $21,858 for females. The per capita income for the village was $12,121. About 26.6% of families and 29.9% of the population were below the poverty line, including 42.0% of those under age 18 and 16.8% of those age 65 or over.

As of 2000 it was the Ohio municipality with the highest percentage of black residents. As of 2002 40% of the town residents rented their residences.

== Government and infrastructure ==
The village maintains its own fire department. As of 2015 the Hamilton County Sheriff's Office provides police services, patrolling Lincoln Heights with eight officers. The village pays $773,000 annually for this coverage.

Previously the village operated its own police department. The department, as of 2014, had eight full-time police officers, seven part-time officers, and four auxiliary officers, or citizens who work one day per week to provide support for police officers. That year, the police department's annual budget was $864,000.

== Crime ==
Illegal drug distribution activity occurred in Lincoln Heights in the 2000s, and the 2010s. In 2014 Lincoln Heights Chief of Police Conroy Chance stated that the most common illegal drugs were crack cocaine and marijuana prior to 2012, but the preferred drugs shifted to heroin that year.

In 2010 Quan Truong and Jennifer Baker of The Cincinnati Enquirer stated that Lincoln Heights had a history of violent crime, one that "plagues" Lincoln Heights. Circa the 2010s typically Lincoln Heights experienced about one or two shootings each year. In 1993 and 2001 there were incidents of Lincoln Heights police cars being set on fire. A man broke into the Lincoln Heights police station on fire in 1998, causing about $100,000 in damages. Persons shot the windows of the village hall and shot at police cars during the same evening. In June 2001 authorities accused 33-year-old Stan Fitzpatrick of murdering community activist Elton "Arybie" Rose after killing Fitzpatrick's girlfriend and the girlfriend's daughter. In the summer of 2010 a man fired bullets at Sharonville police officer who was chasing two suspects while in Lincoln Heights. In September 2010 men with semiautomatic weapons shot at a Woodlawn police car. In 2012 there were four shootings, with one of them being a homicide, and in 2013 there were nine shootings, with four of them being homicides. In May 2014 a joint task force made up of the Ohio Bureau of Criminal Investigation, the county sheriff's department, the Cincinnati Police Department, and the Woodlawn Police Department was established to reduce violence stemming from illegal drug issues.

In 2014, Chance stated that due to the nature of crime in Lincoln Heights, "we police the way that big city polices." Since then the Lincoln Heights police department had been disbanded.

== Education ==
Residents are a part of Princeton City Schools, which operates Lincoln Heights Elementary School. For secondary school residents attend Community Middle School and Princeton High School.

The current Lincoln Heights Elementary building, with a capacity of 440 students, opened in 2006 as part of an $85 million school bond program. In 2012 the school district considered closing the school due to issues with its budget, but the school remained open after a tax levy was passed. Due to violence occurring outside of the school, it was held in an all-day lockdown from May 14 to June 2, 2014. The school district stated that this was due to concern over the safety of the students.

As of 2014, there were fewer than 200 students at Lincoln Heights Elementary, while 40 other elementary-aged children who live in Lincoln Heights attend other schools in the Princeton school district.

== Notable people ==
- Nikki Giovanni, poet
- Darryl Hardy, football player
- Maurice Harvey, football player
- The Isley Brothers, songwriters
- Yvette Simpson, Cincinnati city council member
- Carl Westmoreland, National Underground Railroad Freedom Center manager and scholar
- Tony Yates, basketball player and coach
