= Princeton High School (Ohio) =

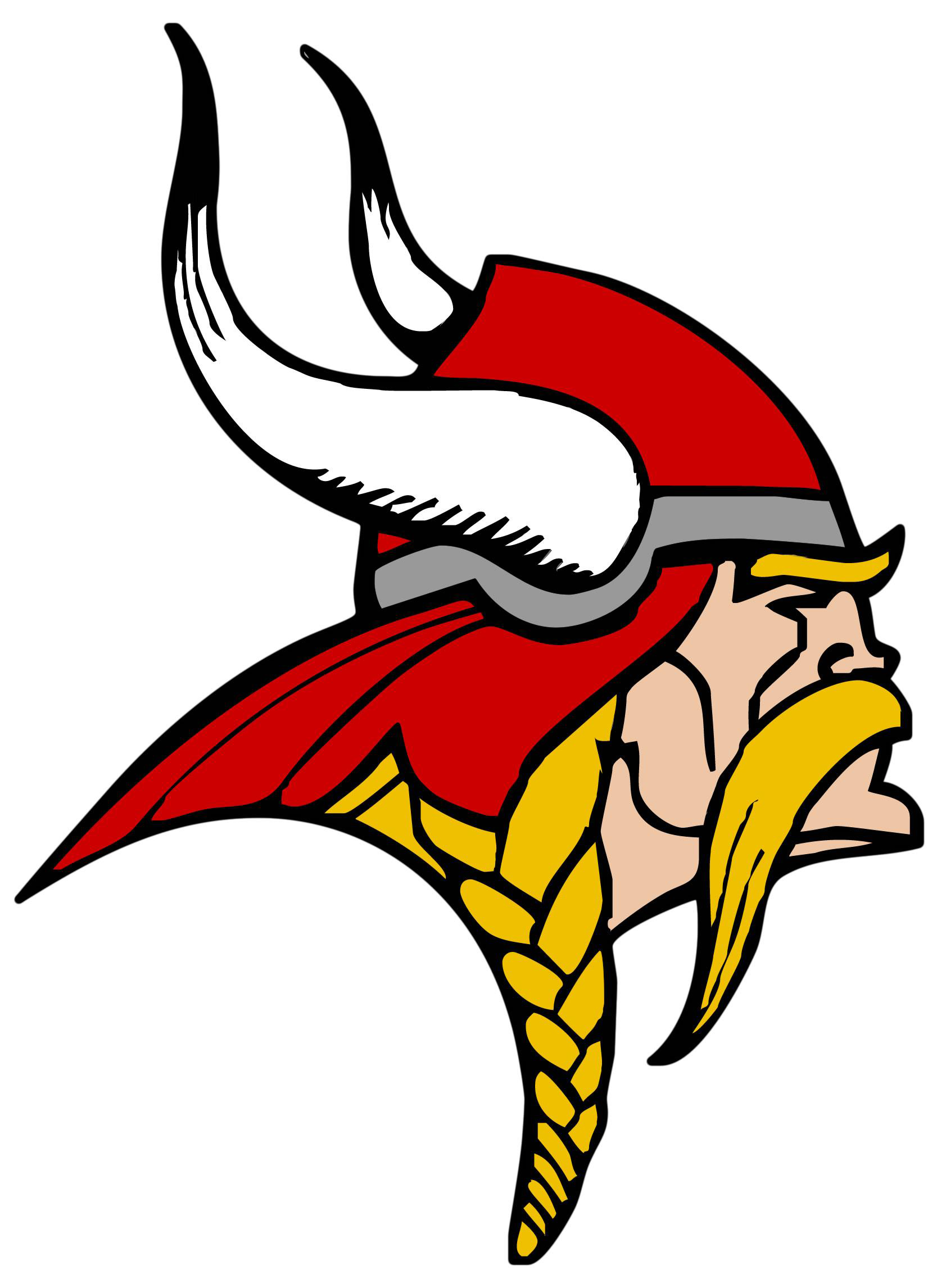

Location
- 100 Viking Way; Cincinnati, Ohio 45246; United States; 39°16′22″N 84°26′35″W

Information
- Type: Public
- Established: 1955
- School district: Princeton City School District
- Principal: James Stallings
- Grades: 9–12
- Enrollment: 1,691 (2023–2024)
- Campus: Suburban
- Colors: Scarlet and gray
- Fight song: "Go Princeton Go"
- Athletics conference: Greater Miami Conference
- Nickname: Vikings
- Accreditation: Ohio Department of Education
- Yearbook: Student Prince
- Website: www.princetonschools.net/o/phs

Princeton High School is a public high school in Sharonville, Ohio, United States. The school is a part of the Princeton City School District.

Princeton High School offers grades nine through twelve, educating students from the Cincinnati metropolitan area communities of Evendale, Glendale, Lincoln Heights, Springdale, Sharonville, Woodlawn, Heritage Hill and portions of Blue Ash, Deerfield Township, West Chester Township, and Springfield Township since its establishment in 1955. Princeton High School is near the intersection of interstates 75 and 275 at 100 Viking Way.

== History ==
Princeton High School was established in 1955 and graduated its first class in 1959. In 1955, the school districts of Woodlawn, Glendale, Springdale, Crescentville, Sharonville, Runyan, Stewart and Evendale consolidated to form the Princeton City School District. The name was taken from the prevalent PR phone prefix used in the area and from Princeton Pike. Princeton High School was built on its current site in 1957-58.

The Ohio State Board of Education merged the predominantly white Princeton High School and the predominantly black Lincoln Heights High School in 1970, bringing Princeton City School District to its current boundaries.

Plans were introduced in 2010 to build a new campus that would house both Princeton High School and the Princeton Community Middle School. The new campus opened in 2014.

In 2026, the Ohio Department of Education and Workforce rated Princeton High School five stars overall, significantly exceeding state standards. This is the first-ever five-star rating for Princeton High School.

== Athletics ==
=== State championships ===
- Boys' football - 1978, 1983, 1987
- Boys' basketball - 2026
- Girls' basketball - 1987, 2014, 2023
- Girls' track and field - 1989

== Notable alumni ==
- Willie Asbury, former NFL running back
- Darren Barnett, former professional football player for the New York Giants
- Harlon Barnett, former NFL player
- Darius Bazley, NBA player
- Ron Carpenter, former NFL player
- Shane Curry, former NFL defensive end
- Erik Daniels, former NBA player
- Phillip Daniels, college football offensive lineman for the Ohio State Buckeyes
- Dee Davis, WNBA player
- Allen DeGraffenreid, former NFL wide receiver
- Carmen Electra, model and actress
- Darryl Hardy, former NFL player
- Josh Harrison, MLB player
- Maurice Harvey, former NFL player
- Alex Higdon, former NFL player
- Harry Howard, former NFL defensive back
- Mi'Quise Humphrey-Grace, college football defensive end for the Kentucky Wildcats
- Carlos Hyde, NFL running back; attended freshman year
- Lance Johnson, MLB player
- Paris Johnson Jr., American football player
- Kenneth Lawson, law professor
- Lorissa McComas, actress and glamour model.
- Kelsey Mitchell, WNBA player
- Megan Piphus, first black, female Sesame Street puppeteer
- J. T. Roberts, former professional soccer player
- Jordan Sibert, professional basketball player
- Yvette Simpson, politician and lawyer
- Tony Snow, Fox News broadcaster, White House Press Secretary for George W. Bush
- Jesse Turnbow, former NFL defensive tackle
- Spencer Ware, NFL player

== See also ==
- Cincinnati Marlins
