= Harry Howard (American football) =

American football player (born 1949)

No. 28, 39
- Position: Defensive back

Personal information
- Born: October 7, 1949 (age 77); Cincinnati, Ohio, U.S.
- Listed height: 6 ft 1 in (1.85 m)
- Listed weight: 189 lb (86 kg)

Career information
- High school: Princeton (Sharonville, Ohio)
- College: Ohio State (1968–1971)
- NFL draft: 1972: 9th round, 225th overall pick

Career history
- Los Angeles Rams (1972)*; San Francisco 49ers (1973)*; Chicago Fire (1974); Chicago Winds (1975); New York Jets (1976)
- * Offseason or practice squad member only

Awards and highlights
- National champion (1970); Second-team All-Big Ten (1971)
- Stats at Pro Football Reference

Harry J. Howard (born October 7, 1949) is an American former professional football defensive back who played one season with the New York Jets of the National Football League (NFL). He played college football at Ohio State and was selected by the Los Angeles Rams in the ninth round of the 1972 NFL draft. He was also a member of the San Francisco 49ers of the NFL and the Chicago Fire and Chicago Winds of the World Football League (WFL).

== Early life ==
Harry J. Howard was born on October 7, 1949, in Cincinnati, Ohio. He attended Princeton High School in Sharonville, Ohio.

== College career ==
Howard was a member of the Ohio State Buckeyes from 1968 to 1971. He was a member of Ohio State's freshman team in 1968 and a three-year letterman from 1969 to 1971. The 1970 Buckeyes were recognized as co-national champions, along with Texas, by the National Football Foundation. Howard was named second-team All-Big Ten by United Press International his senior year in 1971.

== Professional career ==
Howard was selected by the Los Angeles Rams in the ninth round, with the 225th overall pick, of the 1972 NFL draft. He was released by the Rams later in 1972.

Howard signed with the San Francisco 49ers of the NFL in 1973 but was later released.

He played for the Chicago Fire of the World Football League (WFL) in 1974, recording seven interceptions, 41 punt returns for 206 yards, and three kick returns for 64 yards.

Howard played in five games, all starts, for the Chicago Winds of the WFL in 1975, totaling one interception and one punt return for no yards.

He signed with the New York Jets of the NFL in 1976. He played in one game during the 1976 season before being released later in 1976.
