= Princeton City School District =

School district in Ohio, United States

Address
- 3900 Cottingham Drive Cincinnati, Ohio, 45241; United States

District information
- Type: Public
- Grades: PK–12
- Schools: 11
- NCES District ID: 3904467

Students and staff
- Students: 5,927 (2024–2025)
- Teachers: 356.76 (on an FTE basis) (2024–2025)
- Staff: 589.37 (on an FTE basis) (2024–2025)
- Student–teacher ratio: 16.61 (2024–2025)

Other information
- Website: www.princetonschools.net

Princeton City School District (commonly known as Princeton City Schools) is a city school district in northern Hamilton County, Ohio in the Cincinnati metropolitan area. The school district serves Glendale, Lincoln Heights, and Woodlawn; most of the cities of Sharonville, and Springdale; and parts of Blue Ash, Evendale, and Springfield Township. In addition the southeast part of Butler County's West Chester Township, the southwest corner of Warren County's Deerfield Township and the northwest corner of Sycamore Township are in the district.

The school district's general offices are located at 3900 Cottingham Drive in Sharonville. The superintendent is Dr. Mari Phillips.

== History ==
The Princeton City School District was established in 1955, combining Crescentville, Evendale, Sharonville, Glendale, Stewart, Runyan, Woodlawn and Springdale School Districts. Only Sharonville and Glendale had high schools. Three years after the merger of the eight districts, a kind donation of land from Marianna Matthews allowed for the building of Princeton High School, the current building that stands on Chester Road in Sharonville. The auditorium was named after the Matthews' in honor of their donation.

Nearly all Princeton schools have been rebuilt since 2008, with the only exception being Glendale Elementary. All new elementary schools were built by the end of January 2008 for each city/village and the 2009 bond levy passage allowed for a new high school/middle school to be built on the current site of the middle school. The new Princeton Community Middle and High School opened in 2013.

In 2025, Princeton underwent a renovation of Pat Mancuso Field at Jake Sweeney Automotive Stadium. The new complex includes new restrooms, concession stands, locker rooms, field turf, and press box. The stadium also includes a classroom and gameday hospitality areas.

== Schools ==
- High Schools
  - Princeton High School
  - Princeton Innovation Center (Grades 8-12)
- Middle Schools
  - Princeton Community Middle School
- Elementary Schools
  - Evendale Elementary School
  - Glendale Elementary School
  - Heritage Hill Elementary School
  - Lincoln Heights Elementary School
  - Sharonville Elementary School
  - Springdale Elementary School
  - Stewart Elementary School
  - Woodlawn Elementary School

== Accolades ==
The Princeton City School District is rated four stars overall (out of five) by the Ohio Department of Education State Report Card, indicating exceeding state standards. Princeton High School is rated five stars overall, with a five-star rating in graduation rate, progress, and college, career, workforce and military readiness. Additionally, all elementary schools are rated three stars or higher.

The improvement in the Ohio State Report Card for consecutive years has led to the District, Princeton High School, and Princeton Community Middle School receiving the Momentum Award from the State of Ohio.

Every school in the Princeton City School District is a Purple Star School, indicating the school is military-friendly, providing support and resources for students who have a parent or family member in the military.

As of 2026, the Princeton City School District has been designated a "Best Community for Music Education" by the NAMM Foundation for 11 consecutive years.

== See also ==
- List of school districts in Ohio
