= Jordan Sibert =

American basketball player (born 1992)

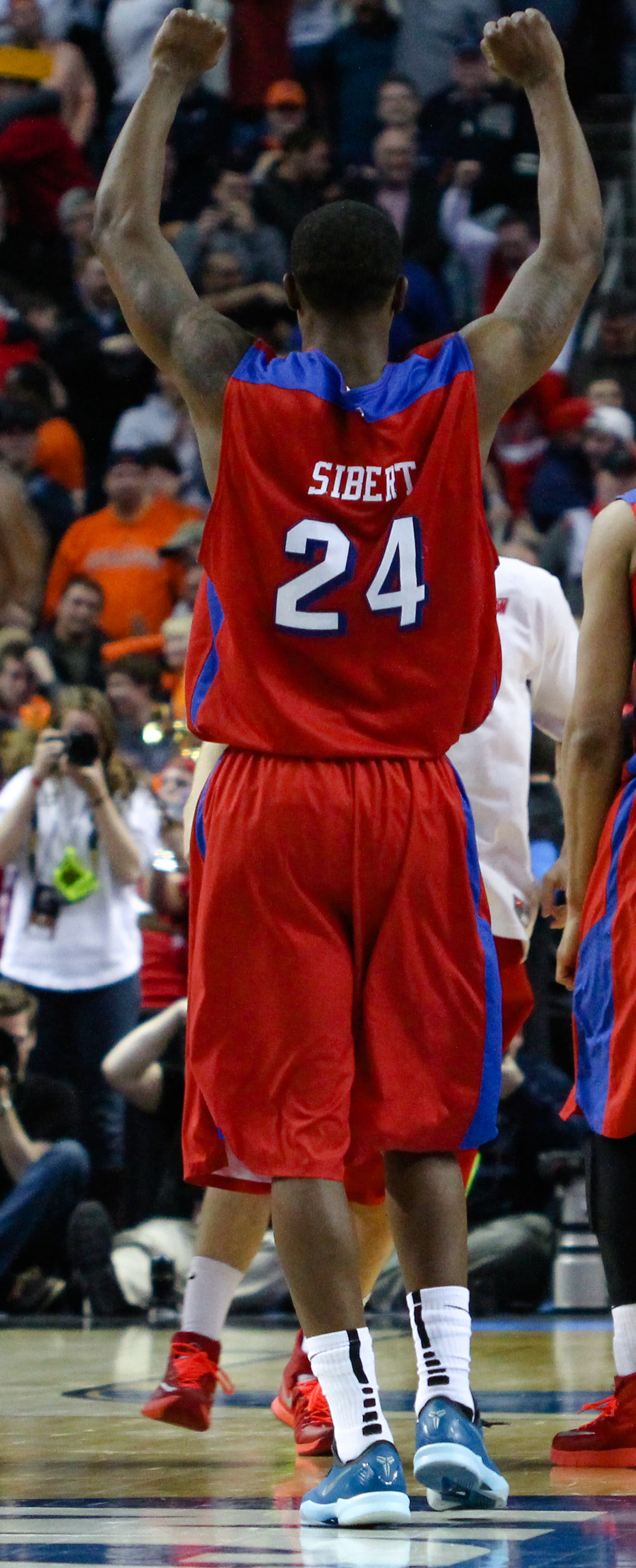
- Sibert playing for Dayton in 2014

Free agent
- Position: Shooting guard

Personal information
- Born: August 1, 1992 (age 34) Cincinnati, Ohio, U.S.
- Listed height: 6 ft 4 in (1.93 m)
- Listed weight: 187 lb (85 kg)

Career information
- High school: Princeton (Sharonville, Ohio)
- College: Ohio State (2010–2012); Dayton (2013–2015)
- NBA draft: 2015: undrafted
- Playing career: 2015–present

Career history
- 2015–2016: Erie BayHawks
- 2016–2017: PAOK Thessaloniki
- 2017–2018: Mitteldeutscher BC
- 2018: Skyliners Frankfurt
- 2018–2019: Erie BayHawks
- 2019: Atlanta Hawks
- 2019–2022: College Park Skyhawks
- 2022: Wisconsin Herd
- 2022–2023: PAOK Thessaloniki
- 2023–2024: Karditsa
- 2024–2025: Vikos Falcons

Career highlights
- First-team All-Atlantic 10 (2015)
- Stats at NBA.com
- Stats at Basketball Reference

Jordan Jerrell Sibert (born August 1, 1992) is an American professional basketball player. He played college basketball for the Ohio State Buckeyes and Dayton Flyers.

== High school career ==
Sibert attended Princeton High School in the Cincinnati suburb of Sharonville, Ohio. As a junior, he averaged 13.3 points per game. He improved his scoring to an 18.7 points per game clip as a senior while leading the team to a 19–5 and a berth in the regional semifinals. Sibert was named the Ohio's Gatorade Player of the Year and the Associated Press selected him to the First Team All-Ohio. Ranked seventh best shooting guard in 2010 by Rivals.com, Sibert committed to Ohio State.

== College career ==
Sibert averaged 11.4 minutes, 3.0 points and 1.4 rebounds as a sophomore on Ohio State's Final Four team in 2011–12. Sibert saw his minutes decrease as the season went on. He opted to transfer to the Dayton Flyers after the season due to lack of playing time, having remained on the bench in the NCAA tournament. OSU coach Thad Matta blamed poor shooting and subpar defense for Sibert not receiving the minutes he wanted.

As a junior, Sibert led Dayton in scoring at 12.2 points per game, shooting 42.6% from behind the arc. He scored in double-figures 24 times and led Dayton to an Elite Eight appearance in the NCAA Tournament. He scored 18 points in defeating Stanford 82–72 in the Sweet 16.

As a senior with the Flyers, Sibert averaged 16.1 points, 3.3 rebounds, two assists and 1.7 steals per game. He was named to the First Team All-Atlantic 10. With a 25–8 record, Dayton was the last team selected to the NCAA Tournament. "It's just a blessing to have an opportunity to play in the tournament," Sibert said. "Some guys didn't hear their name called at all." He led Dayton to a Sweet 16 appearance and finished his Dayton career with 1,030 points. Despite playing only two years, his 163 three-pointers rank seventh in Dayton history.

== Professional career ==
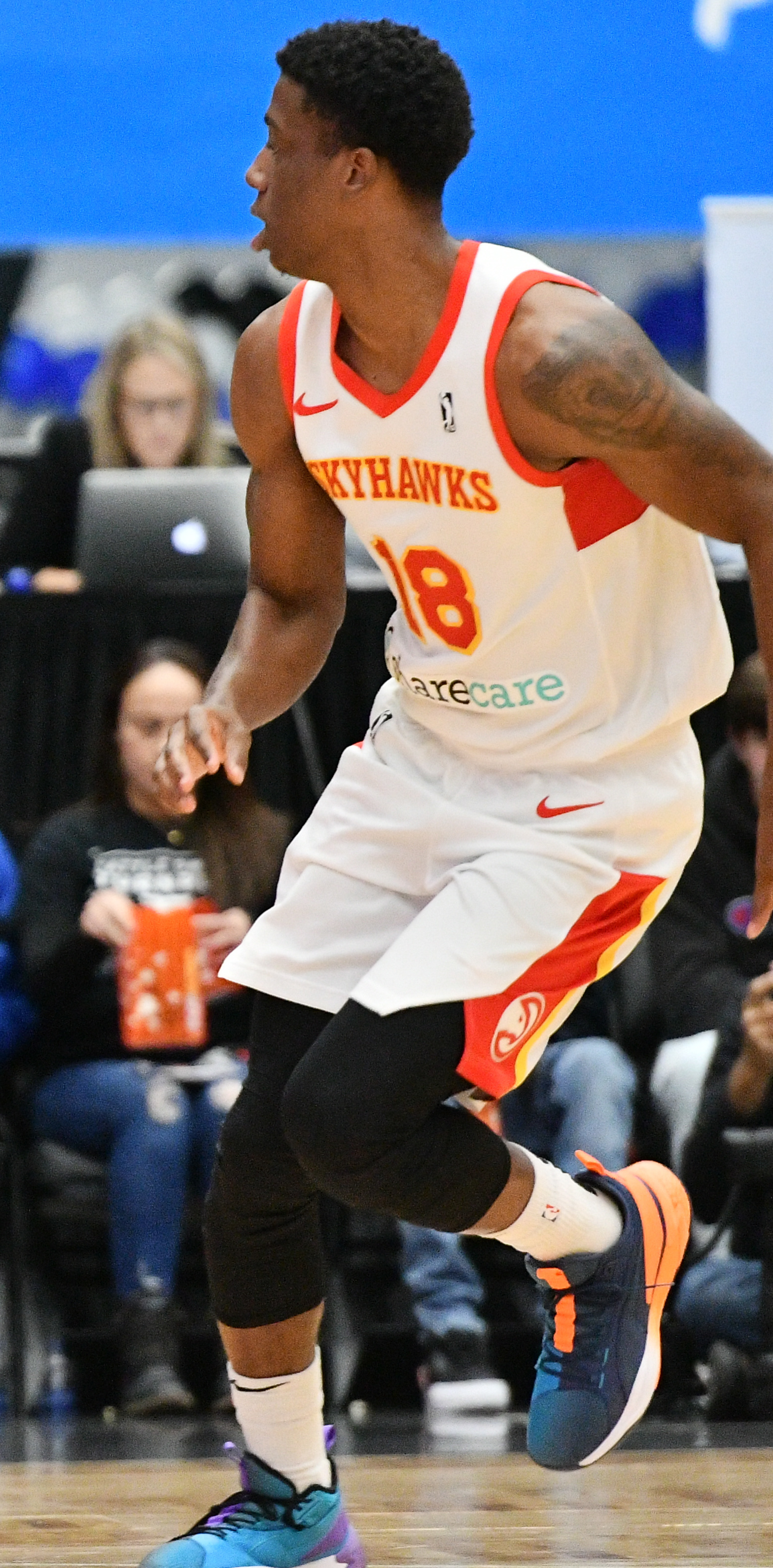
Sibert playing for the College Park Skyhawks in 2019

After going undrafted in the 2015 NBA draft, Sibert joined the Orlando Magic for the Orlando Summer League where he saw action in all three games, averaging 11.3 points, three rebounds and 1.7 assists per game. On September 24, 2015, he signed with the Magic, only to be waived by the team on October 19 after appearing in five preseason games. On October 31, he was acquired by the Erie BayHawks of the NBA Development League as an affiliate player of the Magic.

On July 19, 2016, Sibert signed with the Greek team PAOK Thessaloniki.

On August 23, 2017, Sibert was selected by the new incarnation of the Erie BayHawks in the NBA G League expansion draft. On August 29, he opted to sign with the German club Mitteldeutscher BC instead. Sibert averaged 12.2 points and 2.6 rebounds with Mitteldeutscher BC. In March 2018, he signed with the Skyliners Frankfurt.

In October 2018, Sibert was added to the training camp roster of the Erie BayHawks.

On February 20, 2019, Sibert signed a 10-day contract with the Atlanta Hawks. Sibert was reacquired by the Erie BayHawks on March 3 after the conclusion of the 10-day contract with the Atlanta Hawks. On October 8, 2019, Sibert re-joined the Hawks for training camp.

On October 18, 2019, the Hawks waived Sibert. He was then added to the roster of the College Park Skyhawks. On January 12, 2020, Sibert scored 35 points in a 123–119 victory over Raptors 905, the Skyhawks' fourth straight win. He averaged 13.9 points per game for the Skyhawks.

On February 24, 2022, Sibert was traded to the Wisconsin Herd.

On November 28, 2022, Sibert returned to Greece for PAOK, signing for the rest of the season in order to replace the injured Zaccheus Darko-Kelly. In 21 league games, he averaged 6.2 points and 1.7 rebounds, playing around 14 minutes per contest.

On August 17, 2023, Sibert moved to another Greek club, signing with Karditsa.

== Career statistics ==
Legend
GP	Games played	GS	Games started	MPG	Minutes per game
FG%	Field goal percentage	3P%	3-point field goal percentage	FT%	Free throw percentage
RPG	Rebounds per game	APG	Assists per game	SPG	Steals per game
BPG	Blocks per game	PPG	Points per game	**Bold**	Career high

=== NBA ===
==== Regular season ====
Year	Team	GP	GS	MPG	FG%	3P%	FT%	RPG	APG	SPG	BPG	PPG
2018–19	Atlanta	1	0	4.0	1.000	1.000	-	.0	.0	.0	.0	3.0

=== College ===
Year	Team	GP	GS	MPG	FG%	3P%	FT%	RPG	APG	SPG	BPG	PPG
2010–11	Ohio State	25	0	8.4	.290	.250	.533	1.0	.6	.4	.0	2.1
2011–12	Ohio State	24	2	11.4	.304	.260	.556	1.4	.8	.5	.0	3.0
2013–14	Dayton	**37**	34	26.0	.455	**.426**	.712	2.3	1.5	.8	**.1**	12.2
2014–15	Dayton	36	**35**	**33.8**	**.456**	.349	**.788**	**3.3**	**2.0**	**1.7**	**.1**	**16.1**
Career		122	71	21.8	.430	.364	.738	2.1	1.3	.9	0.1	9.5

== Personal life ==
Sibert is the son of Sheila and Scott Sibert. He has three older siblings, Logan, Scott Jr., and Gennise.
