= Darryl Hardy =

American gridiron football player (born 1968)

No. 58, 54
- Position: Linebacker

Personal information
- Born: November 22, 1968 (age 57); Lincoln Heights, Ohio, U.S.
- Listed height: 6 ft 2 in (1.88 m)
- Listed weight: 230 lb (104 kg)

Career information
- High school: Princeton (Sharonville, Ohio)
- College: Tennessee
- NFL draft: 1992: 10th round, 270th overall pick

Career history
- Atlanta Falcons (1992)*; Ottawa Rough Riders (1994)*; Dallas Cowboys (1994)*; Arizona Cardinals (1994–1995); Dallas Cowboys (1995, 1997); Seattle Seahawks (1997)
- * Offseason or practice squad member only

Awards and highlights
- Super Bowl champion (XXX); First-team All-SEC (1991)

Career NFL statistics
- Tackles: 3
- Stats at Pro Football Reference

Darryl Gerrod Hardy (born November 22, 1968) is an American former professional football player who was a linebacker in the National Football League (NFL) for the Arizona Cardinals, Dallas Cowboys and Seattle Seahawks. He played college football for the Tennessee Volunteers.

== Early life ==
Hardy attended Princeton High School, where he played center on the offensive line as a freshman. The next year, he was moved to offensive tackle. As a senior, he was an All-state offensive guard (weighing 185 pounds). In his final game, he got the opportunity to start at outside linebacker, posting 15 tackles and 4.5 sacks.

He accepted a football scholarship from the University of Tennessee to play linebacker. He became a starter at outside linebacker as a sophomore and registered 20 tackles (fourth in school history) against the University of Alabama.

Hardy helped Tennessee win the Cotton Bowl in 1990 and the Sugar Bowl in 1991. He finished his college career with 318 total tackles, 227 solo tackles (ninth in school history), 20 tackles for loss, 4 interceptions, 5 fumble recoveries, 5 forced fumbles and 5 blocked kicks.

== Professional career ==
=== Atlanta Falcons ===
Hardy was selected by the Atlanta Falcons in the tenth round (270th overall) of the 1992 NFL draft. On August 31, he was waived and signed to the practice squad. He was released on August 23, 1993.

=== Ottawa Rough Riders ===
On April 7, 1994, he was signed by the Ottawa Rough Riders of the Canadian Football League. He was cut on July 4.

=== Dallas Cowboys (first stint) ===
In July 1994, he signed as a free agent with the Dallas Cowboys. He was released on August 3.

=== Arizona Cardinals ===
On August 27, 1994, he was waived and signed to the practice squad. He was promoted to the active roster on December 20 and was declared inactive for the last game of the season.

He was waived On October 2, 1995. He appeared in 5 games, tallying one defensive tackle and 2 special teams tackles.

=== Dallas Cowboys (second stint) ===
On October 3, 1995, he was claimed off waivers by the Cowboys to improve the special teams units. He was a part of the team that won Super Bowl XXX, although he was deactivated for the game. He was cut on August 20, 1996.

In 1996, he injured his left knee in a preseason game against the Los Angeles Raiders. He had arthroscopic surgery on August 2. He was cut on August 20.

He was signed in 1997 and appeared in 12 games. He was released in December.

=== Seattle Seahawks ===
On December 10, 1997, he was claimed off waivers by the Seattle Seahawks. He played on special teams in the final two games of the season. The next year, he failed to report to minicamp and told the Seahawks he was not sure if he wanted to continue playing football. He was released on June 10, 1998.
