= Great Oaks Career Campuses =

School district in Ohio

Great Oaks Career Campuses (formerly Great Oaks Institute of Technology and Career Development and Great Oaks Joint Vocational School District) is a joint vocational school district in southwestern Ohio. It began operating in 1970. Great Oaks is the largest career tech district in Ohio and the second largest in the United States, according to the National Center for Education Statistics. Great Oaks serves 36 affiliate school districts spanning approximately 2,200 square miles. The district operates four career campuses (serving high school juniors and seniors) and over 100 satellite programs embedded in 30 middle and high schools.

In addition to high school programs, Great Oaks offers adult education. The Ohio Department of Education and Workforce rates Great Oaks as a five-star school district.

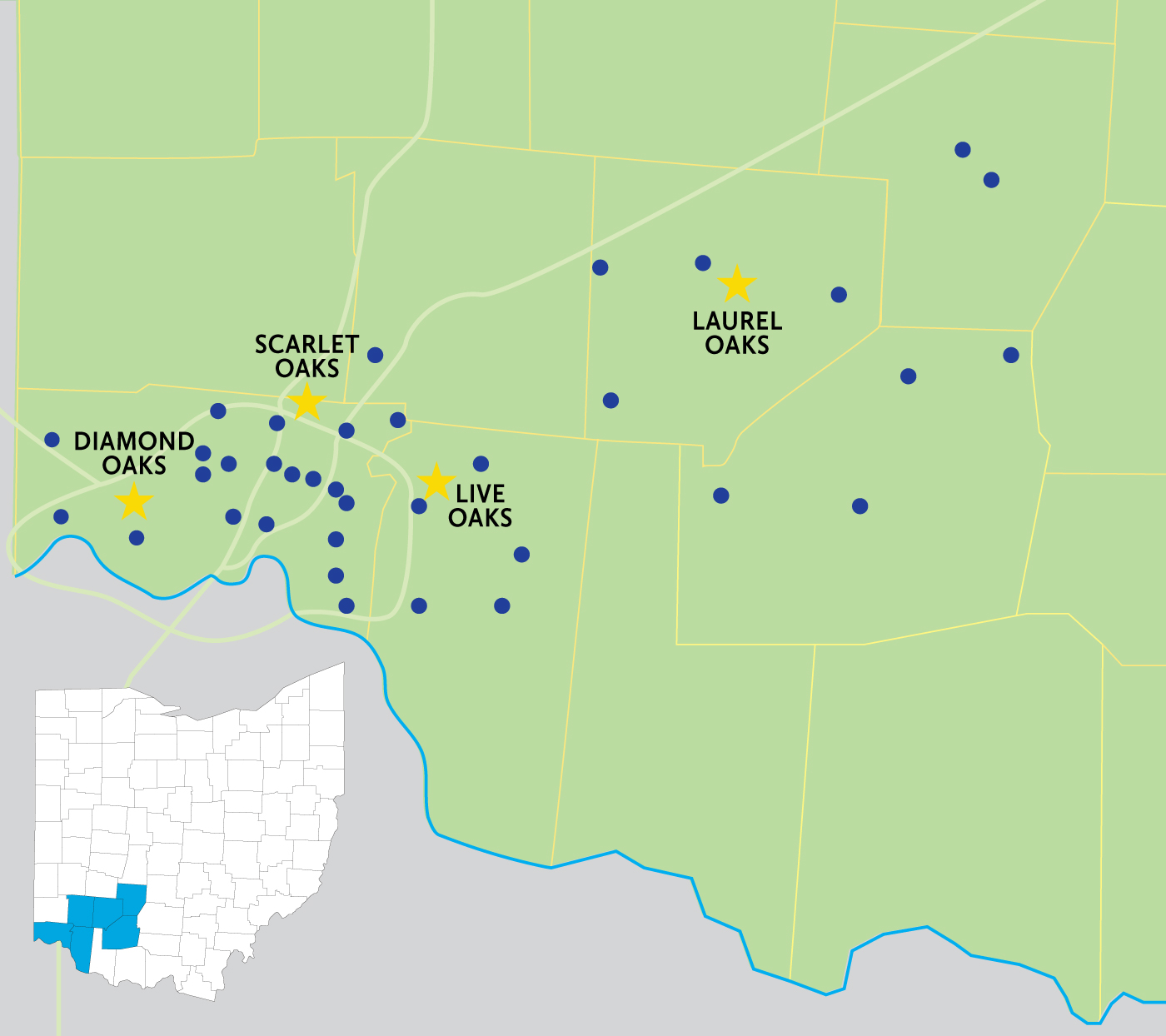
Map of SW Ohio showing where all Great Oaks Affiliates are located

== History ==
The Hamilton County Joint Vocational School District was formed in 1970 when 22 school districts came together as the Hamilton County Joint Vocational School District (Hamilton County JVSD). The name was changed to its current name two years later as school districts in Clermont County, Clinton County, and other areas in southwest Ohio joined.

== Campuses and programs ==
During their junior and senior years of high school, students from 36 Ohio school districts have the option to attend one of four Great Oaks campuses, known as "Career Campuses":

- Diamond Oaks in western Cincinnati, covering the Finneytown, Mt. Healthy, North College Hill, Oak Hills, and Southwest, and Three Rivers school districts
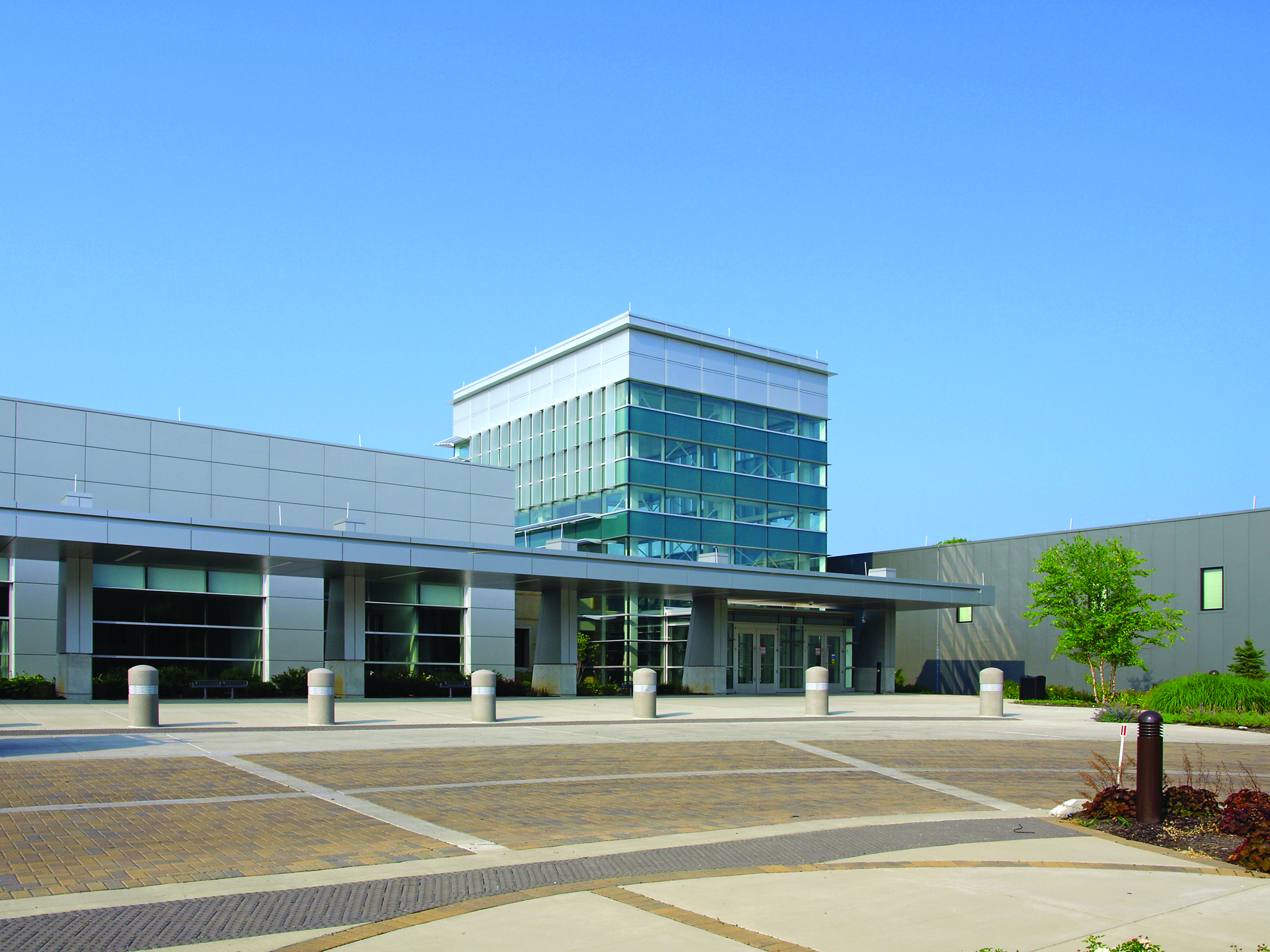
  Diamond Oaks
- Laurel Oaks in Wilmington, covering the Blanchester, Clinton-Massie, East Clinton, Fairfield Local, Hillsboro, Lynchburg-Clay, Greenfield, Miami Trace, Washington Court House, and Wilmington school districts
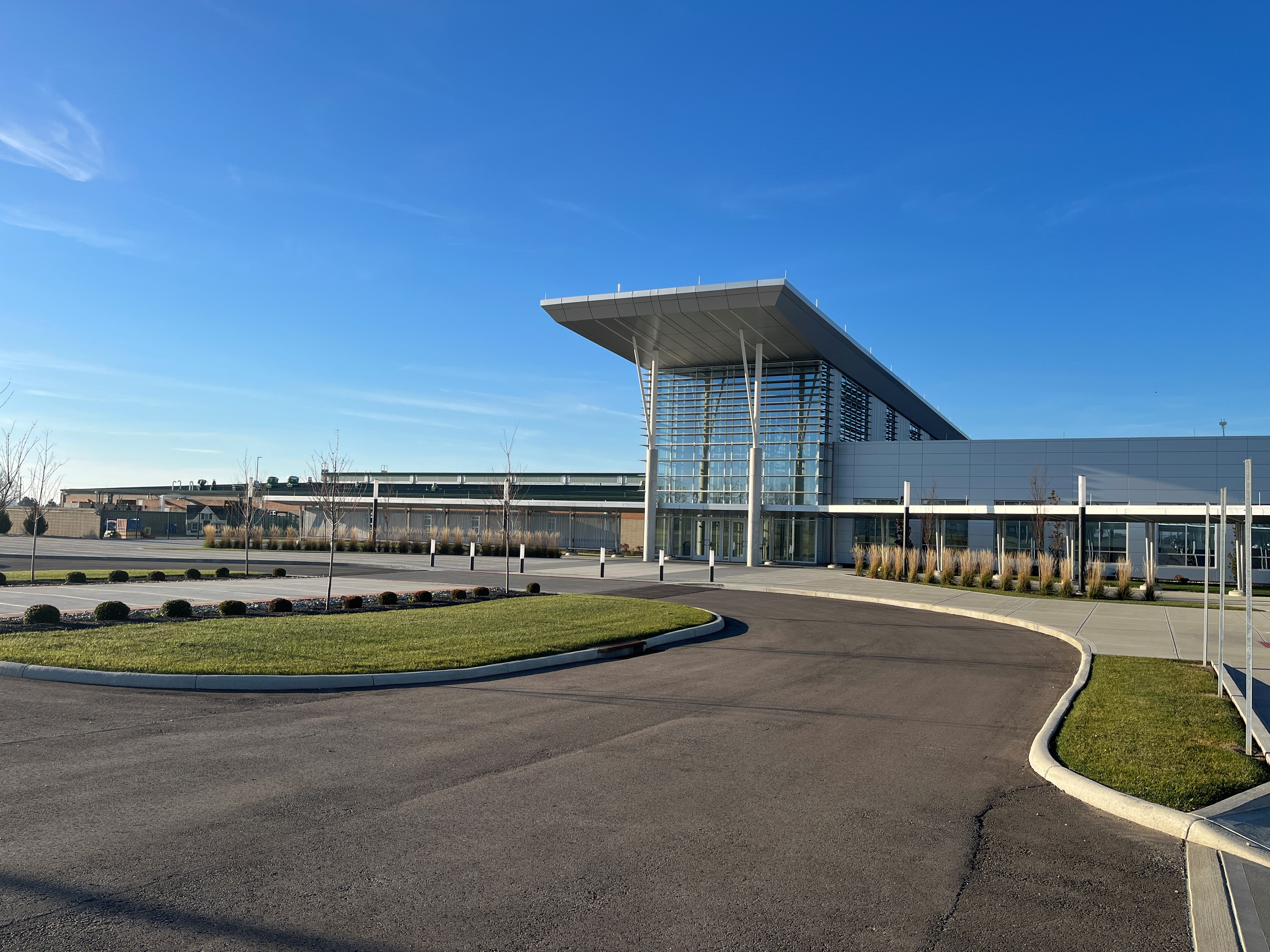
  Laurel Oaks
- Live Oaks in Milford, covering the Batavia, Clermont Northeastern, Forest Hills, Goshen, Indian Hill, Loveland, Madeira, Mariemont, Milford, and West Clermont school districts
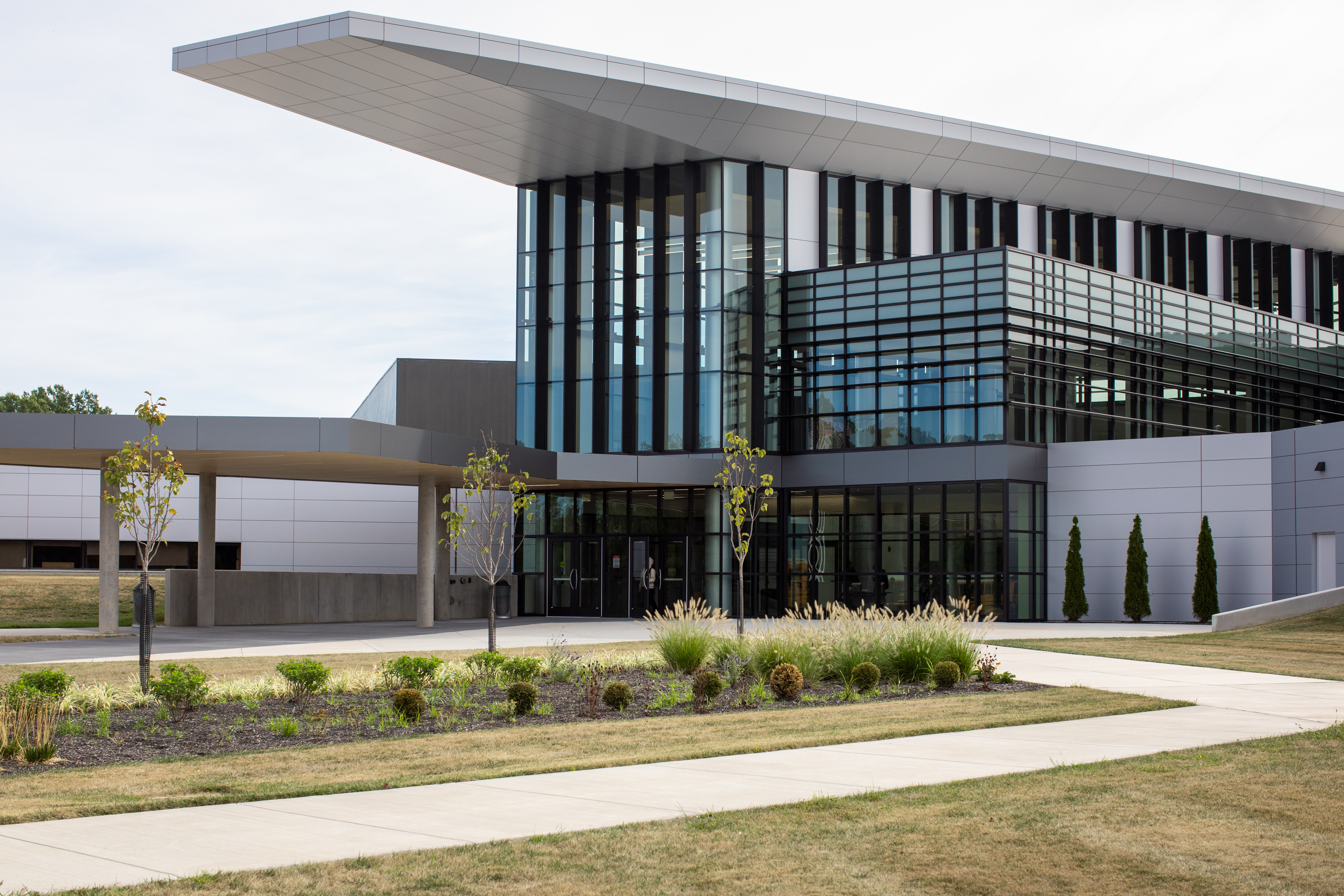
  Live Oaks
- Scarlet Oaks in Sharonville, covering the Deer Park, Lockland, Mason, Norwood, Princeton, Reading, St. Bernard–Elmwood Place, Sycamore, Winton Woods, and Wyoming school districts
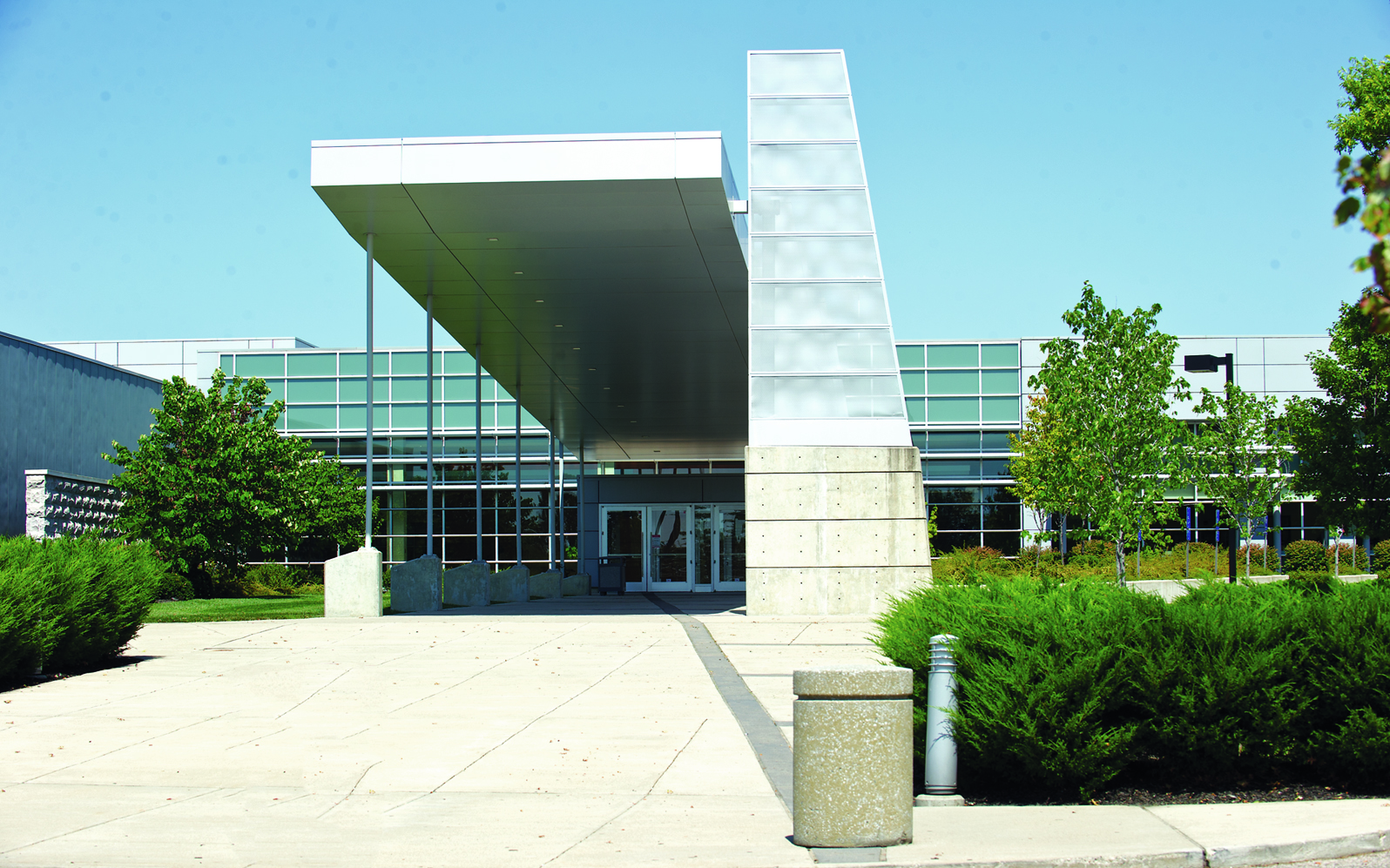
  Scarlet Oaks

Great Oaks also provides satellite programs to their affiliate schools. There are two types of programs typically offered:

- Foundations shape students' career choices by giving them sample experiences typical of the career pathway. Courses range from 7 weeks to a full year.
- Workforce Development programs focus on technical and occupational skills and knowledge to provide students with a pathway to postsecondary education and careers. Programs are usually two years in duration.

In addition, Great Oaks administers three "Project SEARCH" programs. Project SEARCH originated at Cincinnati Children’s Hospital Medical Center in 1996, initiated by Erin Riehle, then the Emergency Department Director. Recognizing the need for employment opportunities for individuals with developmental disabilities, she sought to train them for entry-level positions in her department. Partnering with Susie Rutkowski, the special education director at Great Oaks Career Campuses, they launched Project SEARCH. Since then, the program has expanded from a single site to an international network, focusing on securing competitive employment for young adults with intellectual and developmental disabilities. The program has since become global and in addition to the original program at Cincinnati Children's, Great Oaks also administers programs at Fifth Third Bank and Xavier University.
