= Shane Curry =

American football player (1968–1992)

No. 91
- Position: Defensive end

Personal information
- Born: April 7, 1968; Cincinnati, Ohio, U.S.
- Died: May 4, 1992 (aged 24); Cincinnati, Ohio, U.S.
- Listed height: 6 ft 5 in (1.96 m)
- Listed weight: 270 lb (122 kg)

Career information
- High school: Princeton (Sharonville, Ohio)
- College: Georgia Tech, Miami
- NFL draft: 1991: 2nd round, 40th overall pick

Career history
- Indianapolis Colts (1991)

Awards and highlights
- 2× National champion (1987, 1989); Second-team All-South Independent(1990)

Career NFL statistics
- Games played: 9
- Sacks: 1
- Stats at Pro Football Reference

Shane Clifton Curry (April 7, 1968 – May 4, 1992) was an American professional football defensive end for the Indianapolis Colts of the National Football League (NFL). He played college football for Georgia Tech and the university of Miami. He was selected by the Colts in the second round of the 1991 NFL draft.

He was shot and killed outside a Cincinnati nightclub during an argument over a blocked vehicle on May 4, 1992. Artise Anderson, the 15-year-old nephew of the driver who had blocked Curry's car, was later charged and convicted of the murder. Anderson received 15 years to life, plus 3 years for a weapons charge. He served 16 years in prison and now works as a substance abuse counselor in Mansfield OH.

Pre-draft measurables
Height	Weight	Arm length	Hand span	40-yard dash	10-yard split	20-yard split	20-yard shuttle	Vertical jump	Broad jump	Bench press
6 ft 3 5/8 in (1.92 m)	259 lb (117 kg)	32 in (0.81 m)	10 1/2 in (0.27 m)	5.04 s	1.76 s	2.94 s	4.24 s	27.0 in (0.69 m)	9 ft 0 in (2.74 m)	20 reps

== See also ==
- List of American football players who died during their career
- List of gridiron football players who died during their careers
