= Burchenal Mound =

Archaeological site in Ohio, United States

- U.S. National Register of Historic Places
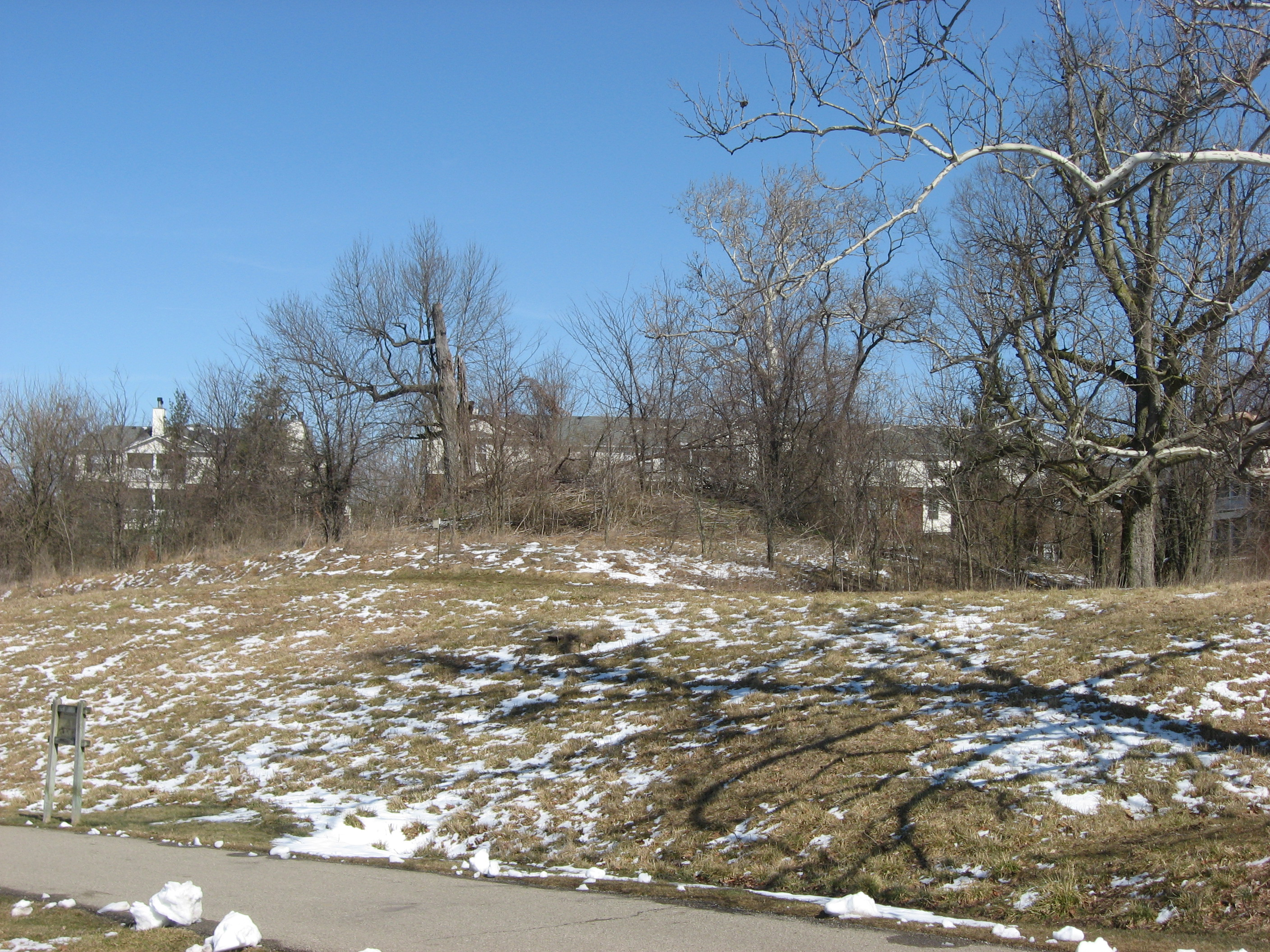
- View from the south

- Location within Ohio Location within the United States
- Location: West of benchmark 659 above Mill Creek
- Nearest city: Woodlawn, Ohio
- Coordinates: 39°15′38.5″N 84°28′23″W
- Area: 38 acres (15 ha)
- NRHP reference No.: 75001437
- Added to NRHP: May 29, 1975

The Burchenal Mound is a Native American mound in the southwestern part of the U.S. state of Ohio.

Located in the village of Woodlawn, the mound occupies an unusual position atop an esker, high above most of the surrounding terrain. Its dimensions are approximately 8 feet (2.4 m) in height and 75 feet (23 m) in diameter. Overlooking the West Fork of Mill Creek, it was once part of a farm owned by the Burchenal family.

A test excavation of the Burchenal Mound was conducted in 1850. However, the results were never published; consequently, the cultural affiliation of its builders is unknown. Based on excavations of similar mounds, it is believed to be the work of the Adena or Hopewell peoples, who typically interred their dead and various grave goods within their mounds. While no further excavations have been conducted since 1850, soil tests have been performed on the surface; these have demonstrated that the mound is built primarily of sand. Its shape is almost perfectly circular.

In 1975, the Burchenal Mound was listed on the National Register of Historic Places because of its archaeological potential.

== See also ==
- Mound
- Mound builder (people)
- Earthwork (archaeology)
- List of burial mounds in the United States
