= Jane Burch Cochran =

American fabric artist (born 1943)

- Born: 1943 (age 82–83)
- Known for: fabric artist, quilting
- Awards: National Endowment for the Arts fellowship

Jane Burch Cochran is an American fabric artist who is known for her work that combines traditional American quiltmaking with painting and fabric embellishments. She received a National Endowment for the Arts fellowship for quiltmaking in 1993.

She is also included in the book, New wave quilt collections : Setsuko Segawa and 15 American artists and Masters: Art Quilts: Major Works by Leading Artists.

== Collections ==
The Smithsonian and the National Quilt Museum display her quilts. Her artwork, After Meeting the Monument Salesman (1990), a quilt collage, 36x30 inches, is in the collection of University of Kentucky Libraries.

Her artistic process involves preparing lightweight canvases with gesso, deciding on the main colors for the piece, cutting from found or purchased fabric or clothing, then embellishing the canvas with the fabric and found beads.

Cochran, who marched in a Freedom March with Martin Luther King Jr. in 1964, created "Crossing to Freedom," a 7 ft by 10 ft quilt for the National Underground Railroad Freedom Center that depicts symbolic images from the anti-slavery era to the Civil Rights Movement.

== Personal life ==
She is based in Rabbit Hash, Kentucky.

Cochran's dog Junior was elected canine mayor in Rabbit Hash, Kentucky 2004–2008. The dog is featured in the quilt "Legacy".
