= Carl Westmoreland =

American community organizer, preservationist, and historian

Carl B. Westmoreland
- Born: Lincoln Heights, Ohio, U.S.
- Education: Knoxville College; University of Cincinnati
- Occupations: Historian, community organizer, preservationist

Carl B. Westmoreland (March 8, 1937 – March 10, 2022) was an American community organizer, preservationist, and senior historian at the National Underground Railroad Freedom Center. In 1967, he was one of the founding members of the Mount Auburn Good Housing Foundation, with money provided by private donations. The purpose of the Mount Auburn Good Housing Foundation was partly in response to the "rampant crime, decrepit housing owned by absentee landlords, and no influence within City Hall" and one of the best ways to improve these circumstances was to "help more young people by helping them find a decent place to live and getting them jobs."

In addition to serving African American communities throughout Cincinnati, he would also go on to become the "first African American to serve on the National Trust for Historic Preservation." Westmoreland was Senior Historian and a founding staff person of the National Underground Railroad Freedom Center in Cincinnati. His work there has included researching the history of the Internal Slave Trade and the historic role that class, gender, race, and slavery have played on contemporary political, social, and economic issues. He attempted to use historic research that often explores the unpleasant as a positive tool that can bring resolution to diverse communities. In addition to the research generated by the demand of his speeches, he was the curator of the Freedom Center's largest exhibit, a slave pen. Slave pens were used as 1 million enslaved African in America were shipped from coastal states to Kentucky, Tennessee, and Mississippi. The Pen is one of the few still in existence. Westmoreland also advised the senior staff on national and international freedom issues. In addition to having overseen millions of dollars in community restoration projects, Westmoreland has taught as an adjunct professor at the University of Cincinnati's Graduate School of Community Planning. He traveled, studied, and lectured in Poland, Italy, Germany, China, and Mexico. He has lectured to a wide audience from neighborhood groups, churches, leaders of U. S. and Mexican governments, and to executives of major corporations in America. Westmoreland has served as an editorial writer for a major newspaper, reviewed books for major publishers, and lectured at major American universities. A major focus of his civic work has been bringing attention to the leaders of all races the cross-cultural importance of the physical preservation of the African American Church. Westmoreland served as the keynote speaker at the 36th bombing of the Sixteenth Street Baptist Church in Birmingham, Alabama and successfully lobbied the National Trust for Historic Preservation in the mid-1990s to declare Black Churches an Endangered American Historic Resource. He has also assisted Black churches in historic buildings to secure listings on the National Register of Historic Places, such as the Union Baptist Cemetery in Cincinnati, and the Saint James African Methodist Episcopal Church and Cemetery in Havre De Grace, Maryland."

== Education ==
After growing up in Lincoln Heights, Ohio and attending Wyoming High School, Westmoreland briefly attended Miami University, before enrolling at Knoxville College, where he began his involvement in community activism. He earned a master's degree in urban sociology.

== Awards ==
- Louise DuPont Crowninshield Award, America's premier award in the field of historic preservation given by the National Trust for Historic Preservation
- Nominated, Rockefeller Foundation Public Service Award
- Partners for Livable Places, Public Service Award, Washington, D.C.
- Underground Railroad Free Press prize for Leadership in the Underground Railroad Community
- Distinguished Alumni award, Wyoming High School, Wyoming, Ohio, one of Newsweek's 100 Best High Schools
- Recipient of honorary Doctor of Humane Letters, Urbana University, Urbana, Ohio
