= RAPTOR Inc. =

Nonprofit raptor rehabilitation center in Ohio

- Location within Ohio Location within the United States
- Type: Raptor rehabilitation center
- Location: Milford, Ohio, United States
- Nearest city: Cincinnati
- Coordinates: 39°13′31″N 84°25′41″W
- Established: 1978
- Website: https://www.raptorinc.org/

The Regional Association for the Protection and Treatment of Raptors (RAPTOR Inc.) is a nonprofit raptor rehabilitation center located in Milford, Ohio. The stated mission of RAPTOR Inc. is the conservation of birds of prey via rehabilitation, education, field research, and community engagement. Its small staff, alongside its team of more than ninety volunteers, support the purpose of the organization through interpretative programming, veterinary care, raptor husbandry, grounds maintenance, photography, social media management, and transport of injured birds. It neighbors the Cincinnati Nature Center, and as of November 2025, is home to ten permanent resident ambassador raptors representing ten species native to Ohio. According to published annual reports from the past six years, the organization annually treats between 250 and 400 injured or ill birds of prey originating from southern Ohio and northern Kentucky.

== History ==
RAPTOR Inc. was incorporated in 1978 and operated for its first twelve years out of a private residence in the neighborhood of College Hill. In 1990, it moved to a house and barn (called the "Covered Bridge" location) near Winton Woods that was owned by Hamilton County Parks. Its current location, referred to by the organization as "Red Barn," was purchased in 2005. Construction on the current mews, flight enclosures, veterinary facility, and offices began in 2010 and finished in 2012.

Cincinnati-based Modernist artist Charley Harper designed the logo for RAPTOR Inc.

== Programs ==
Education staff, volunteers, and bird ambassadors travel around the region year-round for five types of off-site educational programming: formal talks about the adaptations and life histories of birds of prey, formal talks about owl species native to Ohio, interactive owl pellet dissections, a children's book-reading focused on owls for audiences ages 3-6, and informal booths at local events and festivals. RAPTOR Inc. collaborates frequently with libraries, schools, parks, senior centers, and museums, in addition to local environmental organizations like the Little Miami Conservancy, Fernald Preserve, Spring Grove Cemetery, and the Cincinnati Nature Center.

== Conservation and research ==
In 1991, volunteers from RAPTOR Inc. worked alongside the Ohio Department of Natural Resources to monitor peregrine falcon nestlings, as participants in a regional part of a nation-wide reintroduction effort. Beginning in 2022, a pair of peregrine falcons started nesting in downtown Cincinnati on the building that houses the Mercantile Library of Cincinnati, as a result of RAPTOR Inc. volunteers building and installing a nest box. Volunteers from RAPTOR Inc. have banded chicks from the nest in the years when the pair have successfully hatched and raised their clutch.

The organization has also helped with research projects studying the implementation of tracking device backpacks for monitoring American kestrel populations, as well as contributed information and data for research on suburban barred owl and red-shouldered hawk nesting behavior.
