= Cincinnati Nature Center =

Nature center and preserve in Ohio, US

- Interactive map of Cincinnati Nature Center
- Type: Nature center and preserve
- Location: 4949 Tealtown Road; Milford, Ohio, USA
- Coordinates: 39°07′35″N 84°14′49″W
- Area: 1,667 acres (675 ha) in two sites
- Created: 1965
- Founder: Stanley M. Rowe, Sr.
- Visitors: 298,260 People (in 2025)
- Hiking trails: Mashburn Family Discovery Trail (0.72 Miles Easy Trail) Edge Trail (0.66 Miles Easy Trail) Whiteland trace (1.22 Miles Easy Trail) Upland (1.34 Miles Easy Trail) Wildflower (1.13 Miles Moderate Trail) Geology Trail (1.33 Miles Moderate Trail) Lookout trail (2.27 Miles Moderate Trail) Far Ridge (1.4 Miles Difficult trail) Fernwood (1.54 Miles Difficult trail) Redwing (2.93 Miles Difficult trail)
- Website: www.cincynature.org

Cincinnati Nature Center is a nature center and preserve with two locations, the main site known as Rowe Woods in Union Township, Clermont County, Ohio, and Long Branch Farm in Goshen, Ohio.

== Rowe Woods ==
The 1,025-acre Rowe Woods in Union Township, near Milford, features the Rowe Visitor Center with nature exhibits, a wildlife viewing window, library and gift shop. There are over 16 miles of trails that pass through eastern deciduous forest, former agricultural fields, streams, and pond habitats.

The Schott Nature PlayScape was designed to encourage open-ended creative play through the use of natural features on the 1.6-acre site, including water, logs, rocks and dirt. The creation of the PlayScape was inspired by Richard Louv's book Last Child in the Woods that concludes that direct exposure to nature is essential for healthy childhood development.

== Buildings at the Cincinnati Nature Center ==
The 1918 Groesbeck Lodge is planned to be home to the new Center for Conservation & Stewardship, which will become a regional center for excellence in land conservation.

The Abner Hollow Pioneer Cabin is a cabin was built by pioneer settlers in Adams County back in the early 1800’s. It was moved to the Cincinnati Nature Center in 1997.

The Abner Hollow Pioneer Cabin

The Krippendorf Lodge was built by Charles and Mary Breuer Krippendorf. The land was bought in 1905 and 1908 totaling 175 acres. Land on Avery Run was bought to build a gasoline-powered pump to transport water uphill to a water tank house on the property. It was bought for filling the dipping pool on the terrace, watering plants and bulbs, and the first inground, concrete swimming pool in Clermont County. The Krippendorf Estate also acted as a business head quarters for the Krippendorf-Dittman Shoe Company.

The Inside of the Abner Hollow Pioneer Cabin.

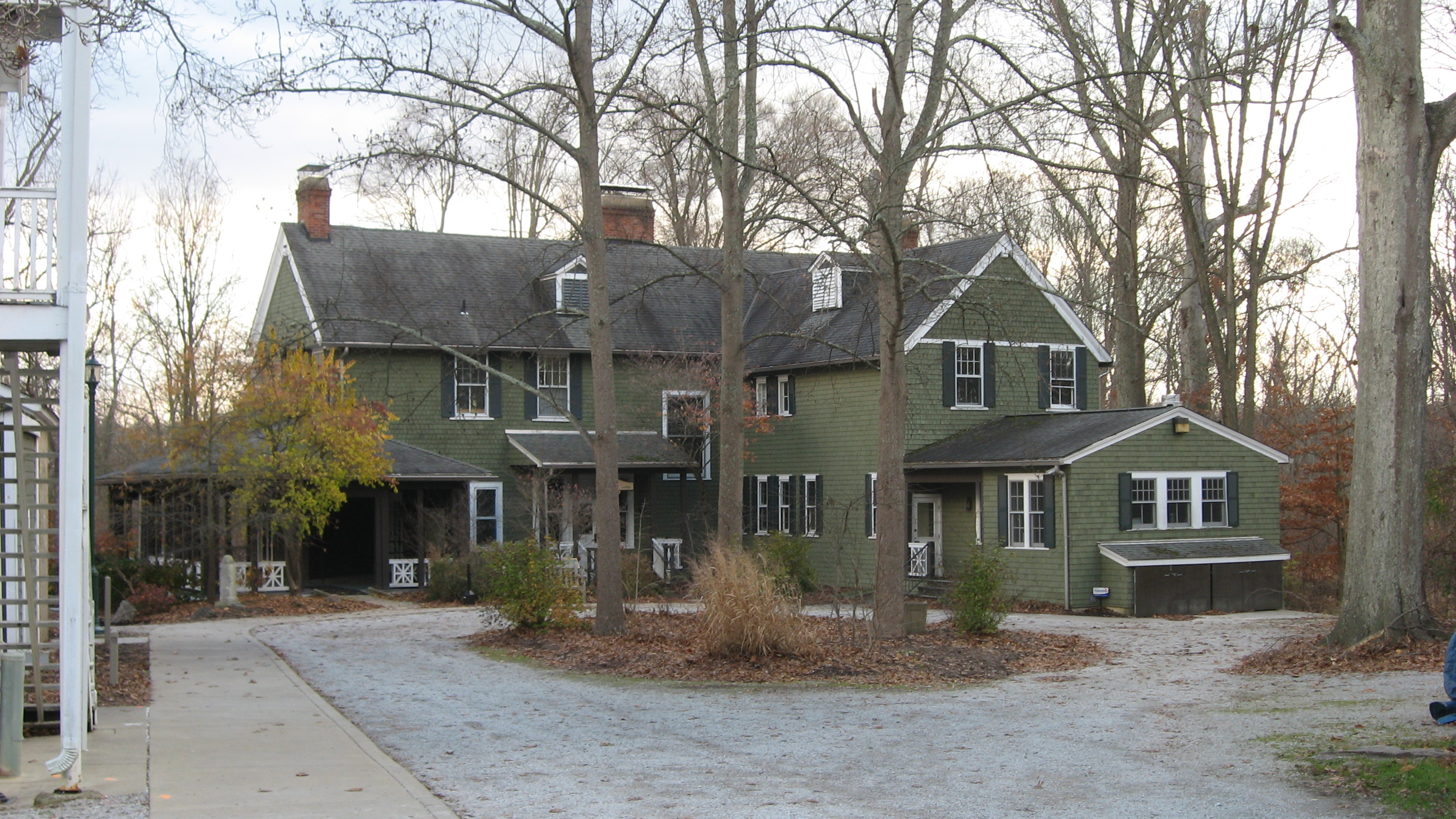
The Krippendorf Estate house in 2013

== Long Branch Farm ==
The 642-acre Long Branch Farm and Trails in Goshen is open to members only. There are four miles of trails through deciduous forest, fields, streams and ponds.

== Events at the Cincinnati Nature Center ==
Light in the Forest is a ticketed event hosted in December that features food trucks, 1 mile of illuminated trails, art installation by 6 BLINK artists and a ceremonial 6pm lighting of all the Christmas lights at the Krippendorf Lodge.

Hike for Your Health is an event sponsored by Cintas in which hikers get a passport and a stamp for every trail. Until they complete all 17 trails, earning them get a Trailblazer prize.

== See also ==
- Gorman Heritage Farm, formerly operated by the Cincinnati Nature Center
- RAPTOR Inc., a raptor rehabilitation center adjacent to the Cincinnati Nature Center
