= Darren Barnett =

American football player (1984–2021)

No. 41
- Position: Cornerback

Personal information
- Born: May 22, 1984; Cincinnati, Ohio, U.S.
- Died: July 1, 2021 (aged 37); St. Louis, Missouri, U.S.
- Listed height: 5 ft 10 in (1.78 m)
- Listed weight: 186 lb (84 kg)

Career information
- High school: Princeton (Cincinnati, OH)
- College: Michigan State; Southwest Missouri State
- NFL draft: 2007: undrafted

Career history
- New York Giants (2007–2008)*; Odessa Roughnecks (2009); Cincinnati Commandos (2012)
- * Offseason or practice squad member only

Awards and highlights
- 1st Team All-Gateway Conference; Super Bowl Champion (XLII); Ultimate Bowl Champion

Darren Alan Barnett (May 22, 1984 - July 1, 2021) was an American professional football player who was a cornerback.

Barnett was born in Cincinnati, Ohio. He played scholastically at Princeton High School and collegiately at Michigan State and Southwest Missouri State.

Barnett was signed by the New York Giants as an undrafted free agent in 2007. He was released at the end of the pre-season, but was added to their practice squad in mid-October and earned a Super Bowl ring with the team for their victory in Super Bowl XLII.

He again spent training camp with the Giants in 2008, but again was released at the end of the pre-season.

Barnett spent the 2009 season with the Odessa Roughnecks of the Indoor Football League.

Barnett was the nephew of Harlon Barnett, who also played at Princeton and Michigan State.

Barnett was shot to death in St. Louis on July 1, 2021 at age 37.

== Early life ==
Barnett graduated from Princeton High School in 2003.

College recruiting
| Name | Hometown | School | Height | Weight | 40^{‡} | Commit date |
|---|---|---|---|---|---|---|
| Darrin Barnet; DB | Cincinnati, Ohio | Princeton High School | 6 ft 0 in (1.83 m) | 180 lb (82 kg) | 4.45 | Jul 8, 2003 |
| Darrin Barnet; DB | Recruit ratings: Scout: Rivals: | | | | | |
Overall recruit ranking: Scout: -- (DB) Rivals: -- (DB), -- (OH)
‡ Refers to 40-yard dash; Note: In many cases, Scout, Rivals, 247Sports, On3, and ESPN may conflict in their listings of height, weight and 40 time.; In these cases, the average was taken. ESPN grades are on a 100-point scale.; Sources: "2002 Team Ranking". Rivals.com.

Barnett committed to Michigan State University on July 8, 2003.
