= Gorman Heritage Farm =

- Brown–Gorman Farm
- U.S. National Register of Historic Places
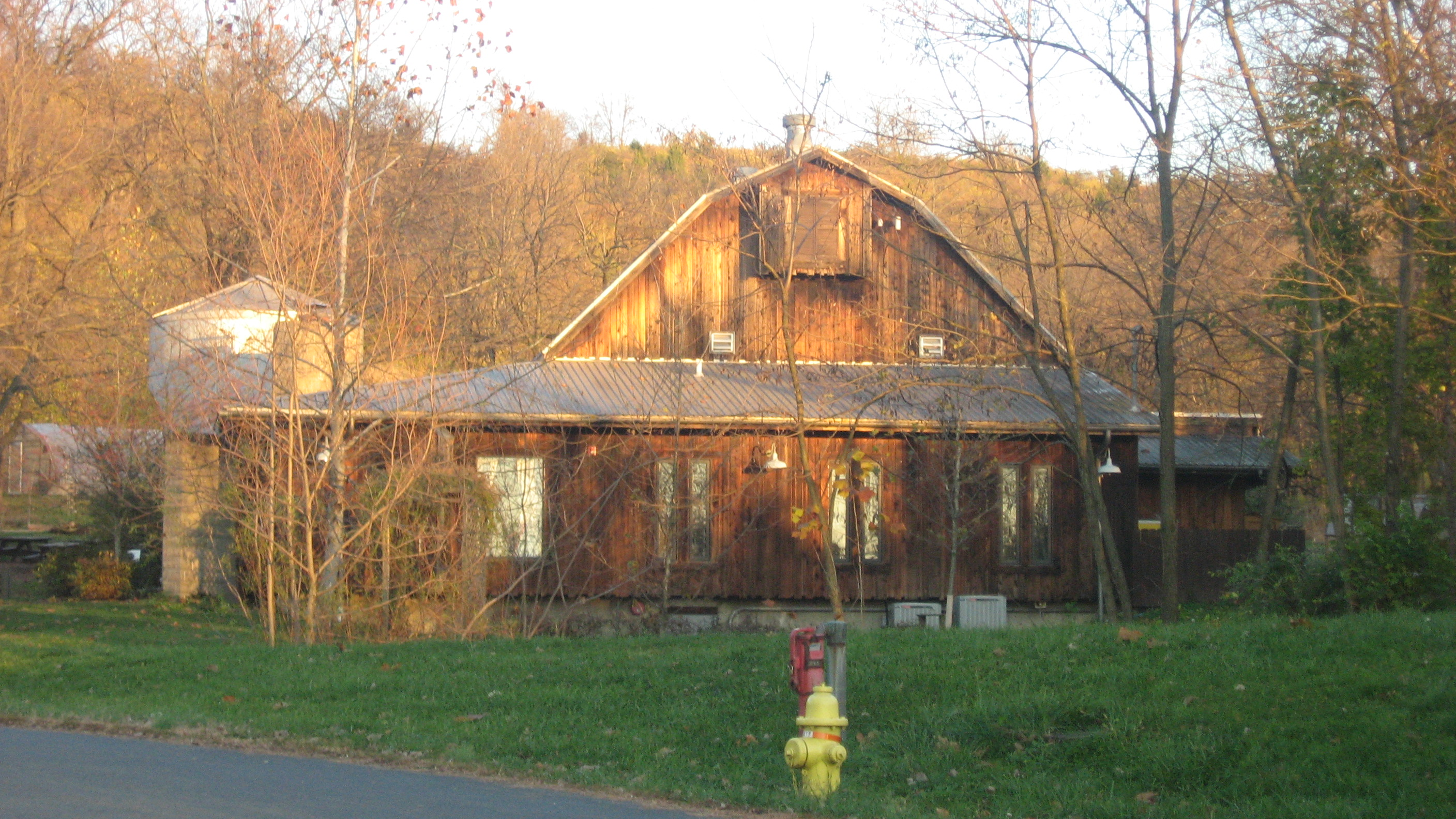
- The interpretive center at Gorman Heritage Farm

- Location within Ohio Location within the United States
- Location: 10052 Reading Road, Evendale, Ohio
- Coordinates: 39°14′42″N 84°25′28″W
- Area: 122 acres (49 ha)
- Built: 1835
- Architect: Edward Brown
- NRHP reference No.: 12000463
- Added to NRHP: August 1, 2012

Gorman Heritage Farm is a working farm museum on 122 acres (49 ha) in Evendale, Ohio, United States. The farm consists of 30 tillable acres (12 ha), a farmyard, gardens, 5 miles (8.0 km) of hiking trails, and a wildflower preserve. The farm raises livestock, grows produce and flowers, and produces biochar. The farm is operated by the non-profit Gorman Heritage Farm Foundation, whose mission is to educate visitors about agriculture, nutrition, sustainability, and the environment. The farm is listed on the National Register of Historic Places as the Brown–Gorman Farm.

== History ==
The farm was started by Edward Brown, an immigrant from Scotland, who built the main barn in 1835 and later moved to Illinois. His cousin, George Brown, took over the farm. It was eventually handed down to Jim and Dorothy Gorman in 1943.

In 1996, the Cincinnati Nature Center took ownership of the farm and converted it into an outdoor educational facility. The main barn was turned into an interpretive center. The Nature Center turned the farm over to the Village of Evendale, which established the Gorman Heritage Farm Foundation. In 2012, the entire farm was listed on the National Register of Historic Places as the Brown–Gorman Farm, owing to its historically significant architecture.

== See also ==
- National Register of Historic Places listings in Hamilton County, Ohio
