= Maurice Harvey =

American football player (born 1956)

No. 27, 23, 24
- Position: Safety

Personal information
- Born: January 14, 1956 (age 70); Cincinnati, Ohio, U.S.
- Listed height: 5 ft 10 in (1.78 m)
- Listed weight: 190 lb (86 kg)

Career information
- High school: Princeton (Sharonville, Ohio)
- College: Ball State
- NFL draft: 1978: 4th round, 86th overall pick

Career history
- Denver Broncos (1978–1980); Green Bay Packers (1981–1983); Detroit Lions (1983); Tampa Bay Buccaneers (1984); Detroit Lions (1987)

Career NFL statistics
- Interceptions: 9
- Fumble recoveries: 6
- Touchdowns: 1
- Stats at Pro Football Reference

Maurice N. Harvey (born January 14, 1956) is an American former professional football player who was a safety in the National Football League (NFL). He played seven seasons for the Denver Broncos, the Green Bay Packers, the Detroit Lions, and the Tampa Bay Buccaneers. He played college football for the Ball State Cardinals.
