= National Underground Railroad Freedom Center =

Museum in Cincinnati, Ohio, U.S.

Coordinates: 39.09790°N 84.51148°W

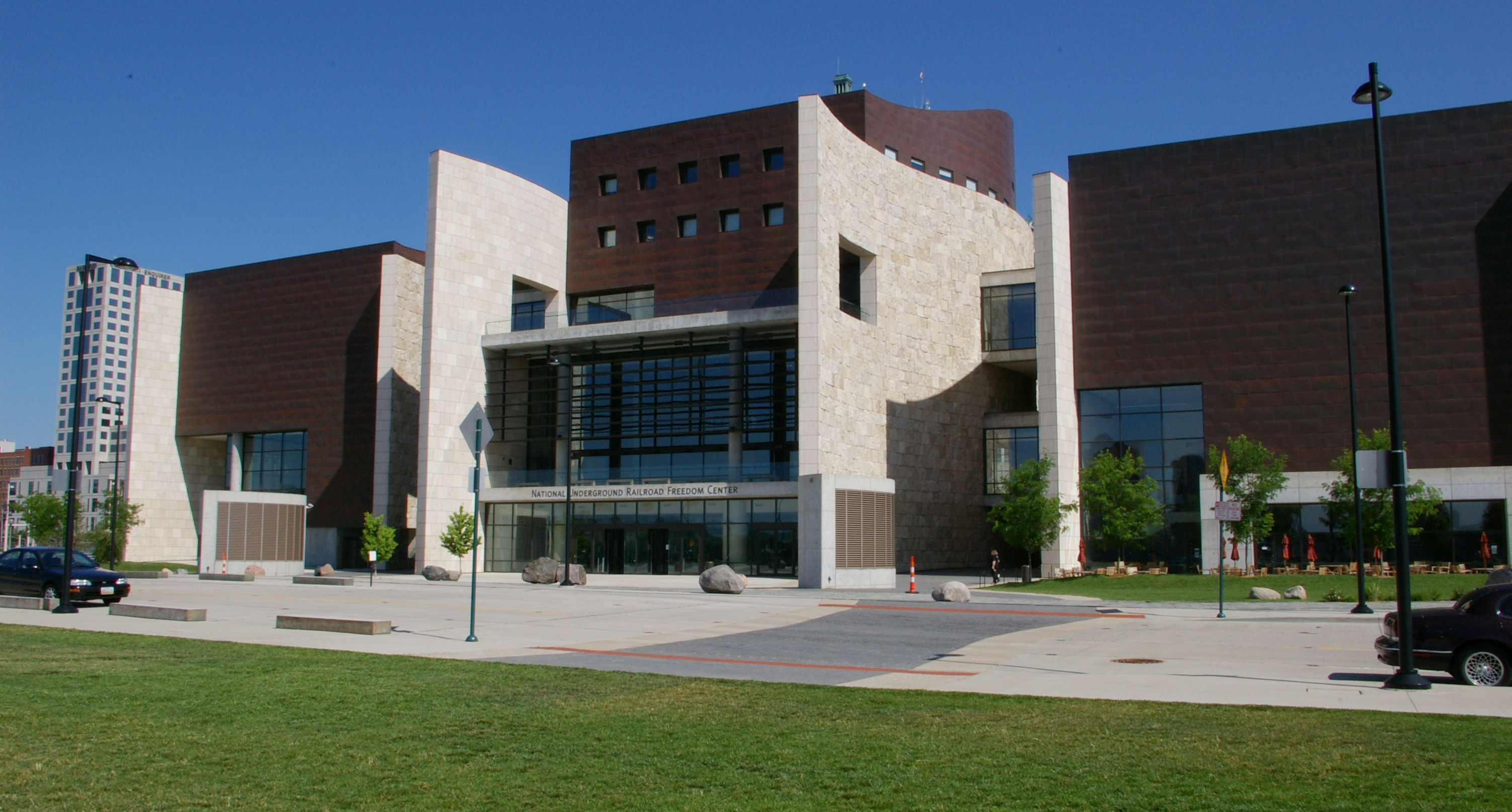
- Established: August 2004
- Location: 50 E. Freedom Way Cincinnati, Ohio 45202
- Type: Public
- Visitors: 180,000 annual
- Presidents: Woodrow Keown, Jr.
- Public transit access: Connector at The Banks
- Website: freedomcenter.org

The National Underground Railroad Freedom Center is a museum in downtown Cincinnati, Ohio, based on the history of the Underground Railroad. Opened in 2004, the center also pays tribute to all efforts to "abolish human enslavement and secure freedom for all people".

It is one of a new group of "museums of conscience" in the United States, along with the Museum of Tolerance, the United States Holocaust Memorial Museum and the National Civil Rights Museum. The center offers insight into the struggle for freedom in the past, in the present, and for the future, as it attempts to challenge visitors to contemplate the meaning of freedom in their own lives. Its location recognizes the significant role of Cincinnati in the history of the Underground Railroad, as thousands of slaves escaped to freedom by crossing the Ohio River from the southern slave states. Many found refuge in the city, some staying there temporarily before heading north to gain freedom in Canada.

== The structure ==
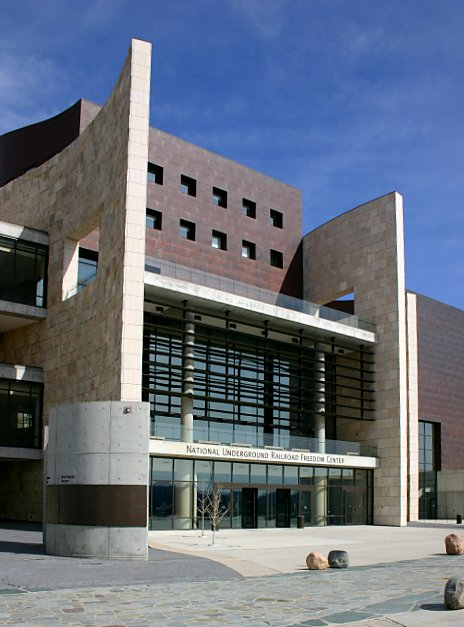
Main entrance to the National Underground Railroad Freedom Center

After ten years of planning, fundraising, and construction, the $110 million (~$175 million in 2024) Freedom Center opened to the public on August 3, 2004; official opening ceremonies took place on August 23. The 158,000 square foot (15,000 m^{2}) structure was designed by Boora Architects (design architect) of Portland, Oregon with Blackburn Architects (architect of record) of Indianapolis. Three pavilions celebrate courage, cooperation and perseverance. The exterior features rough travertine stone from Tivoli, Italy on the east and west faces of the building, and copper panels on the north and south. According to Walter Blackburn, one of its primary architects before his death, the building's "undulating quality" expresses the fields and the river that escaping slaves crossed to reach freedom. First Lady Laura Bush, Oprah Winfrey, and Muhammad Ali attended the groundbreaking ceremony on June 17, 2002.

== Slave pen ==
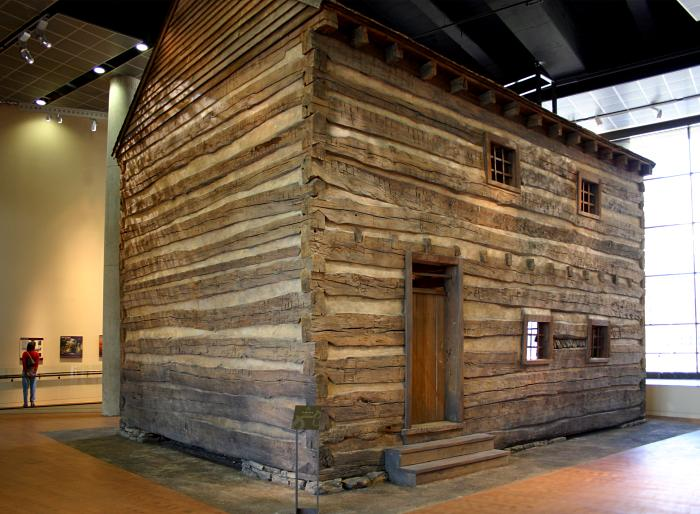
The slave pen, the principal artifact at the Freedom Center, was transported from its original Kentucky location and reconstructed on the second floor of the Center

The center's principal artifact is a 21 by 30-foot (6 by 9 m), two-story log slave pen built in 1830. By 2003, it was "the only known surviving rural slave jail," previously used to house slaves prior to their being shipped to auction. The structure was moved from a farm in Mason County, Kentucky, where a tobacco barn had been built around it.

It was reconstructed in the second-floor atrium of the museum, where visitors encounter it again and again while exploring other exhibits. Passersby on the street outside can also see it through the center's large windows.

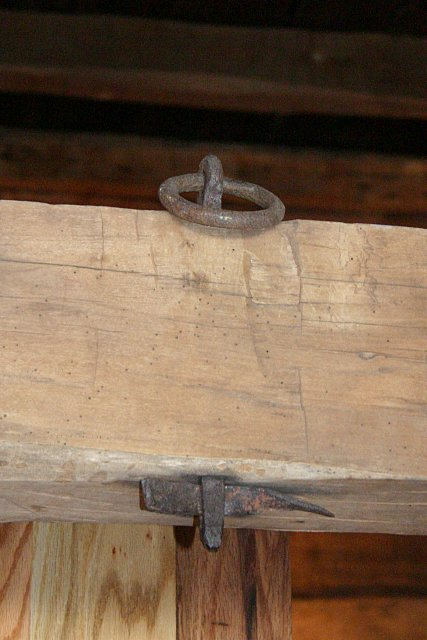
This shackle ring in the second-floor joist was used to secure male slaves in the pen

The pen was originally owned by Captain John Anderson, a veteran of the Revolutionary War and slave trader. Slaves from the area were transported from Dover, Kentucky to slave markets in Natchez, Mississippi and New Orleans, Louisiana; they were held in this pen for a few days or several months, as he and other traders waited for favorable market conditions and higher selling prices. The pen has eight small windows, the original stone floor and fireplace. On the second floor are a row of wrought iron rings (see photo at right) through which a central chain ran, tethering men on either side. Male slaves were held on the second floor, while women were kept on the first floor, where they used the fireplace for cooking.

"The pen is powerful," says Carl Westmoreland, curator and senior adviser to the museum. "It has the feeling of hallowed ground. When people stand inside, they speak in whispers. It is a sacred place. I believe it is here to tell a story – the story of the internal slave trade to future generations."

Visitors to the museum could at one time walk through the holding pen and touch its walls. It is now closed off. The first names of some of the slaves believed to have been held in the pen are listed on a wooden slab in the pen's interior; they were documented in records kept by slave traders who used the pen.

Westmoreland spent three and a half years uncovering the story of the slave jail. Its authentication by him and other historians is considered "a landmark in the material culture of slavery". Westmoreland said,

We're just beginning to remember. There is a hidden history right below the surface, part of the unspoken vocabulary of the American historic landscape. It's nothing but a pile of logs, yet it is everything.

== Other features ==
Prominent features of the Center include:

- The "Suite for Freedom" Theater features three animated films: these address the fragile nature of freedom throughout human history, particularly as related to the Underground Railroad and slavery in the United States.
- The "ESCAPE! Freedom Seekers" interactive display about the Underground Railroad; it presents school groups and families with young children a series of choices on an imaginary escape attempt. The gallery features information about figures including William Lloyd Garrison, a leading abolitionist; Harriet Tubman, an escaped slave and "conductor" on the Underground Railroad; and Frederick Douglass, an escaped slave who became an abolitionist and powerful orator.
- The film, Brothers of the Borderland, tells the story of the Underground Railroad in Ripley, Ohio, where conductors, both black (John Parker) and white (Reverend John Rankin), helped slaves such as a fictional Alice. It was directed by Julie Dash.
- Exhibits about the history of slavery and opponents including John Brown and President Abraham Lincoln; and the American Civil War that ended it.
- The Struggle Continues, an exhibit portrays continuing challenges faced by African Americans since the end of slavery, struggles for freedom in today's world, and ways that the Underground Railroad has inspired groups in India, Poland and South Africa.
- The John Parker Library houses a collection of multimedia materials about the Underground Railroad and freedom-related issues.
- The FamilySearch Center allows visitors to investigate their own roots.
- Jane Burch Cochran created a quilt, "Crossing to Freedom," a 7 ft by 10 ft that depicts symbolic images from the anti-slavery era to the Civil Rights Movement that hangs at an entrance to the center.

The Freedom Center's former executive director and CEO, John Pepper, was previously the CEO of Procter & Gamble.

== See also ==
- List of museums focused on African Americans
