= Sharonville, Ohio =

City in Ohio, US

- City
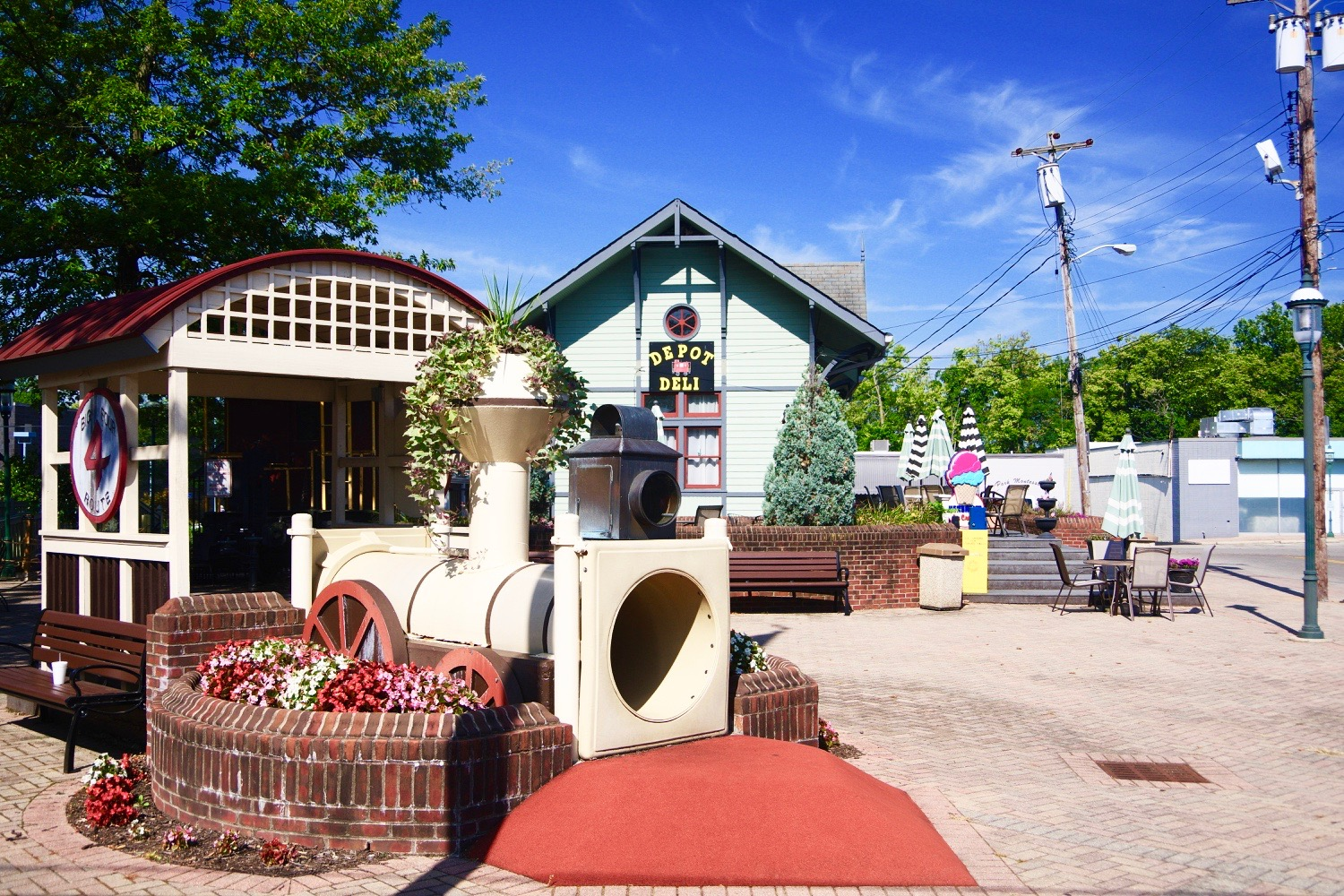
- Depot Square

- Flag Logo
- Interactive map of Sharonville, Ohio
- Location within Ohio Location within the United States
- Coordinates: 39°17′02″N 84°22′47″W
- Country: United States
- State: Ohio
- Counties: Hamilton, Butler
- Township: West Chester (Butler County portion)

Government
  - Mayor: Kevin Hardman (R)
  - President of Council: Paul Culter
  - Law Director: Charles Lippert

Area
  - Total: 9.86 sq mi (25.54 km^{2})
  - Land: 9.81 sq mi (25.40 km^{2})
  - Water: 0.054 sq mi (0.14 km^{2})
- Elevation: 614 ft (187 m)

Population (2020)
  - Total: 14,117
  - Estimate (2022): 13,899
  - Density: 1,439.3/sq mi (555.73/km^{2})
- Time zone: UTC-5 (Eastern (EST))
  - Summer (DST): UTC-4 (EDT)
- ZIP code: 45241
- Area code: 513
- FIPS code: 39-71892
- GNIS feature ID: 1086227
- Website: www.sharonville.org

Sharonville is a city largely in Hamilton County, Ohio, United States. The population was 14,117 at the 2020 census. Sharonville is part of the Cincinnati metropolitan area and located about 13 miles (21 km) from downtown Cincinnati.

== History ==
Settlers arrived in what is now Sharonville in 1788. The community was first known as Sharon. The village of Sharonville was incorporated in 1911 and received its city rights in 1962. In August 1974, the city council adopted a flag based on a winning contest entry.

== Geography ==
According to the United States Census Bureau, the city has a total area of 9.89 square miles (25.61 km^{2}), of which 9.83 square miles (25.46 km^{2}) is land and 0.06 square miles (0.16 km^{2}) is water.

== Demographics ==
Historical population
Census	Pop.	Note	%±
1920	753		—
1930	1,111		47.5%
1940	1,157		4.1%
1950	1,318		13.9%
1960	3,890		195.1%
1970	11,393		192.9%
1980	10,108		−11.3%
1990	13,153		30.1%
2000	13,804		4.9%
2010	13,560		−1.8%
2020	14,117		4.1%
2025 (est.)	13,997		−0.9%

=== 2020 census ===
As of the 2020 census, Sharonville had a population of 14,117, for a population density of 1,439.34 people per square mile (555.73/km^{2}) and 6,628 housing units, of which 6.5% were vacant. The homeowner vacancy rate was 0.7% and the rental vacancy rate was 9.6%.

100.0% of residents lived in urban areas, while 0.0% lived in rural areas.

There were 6,197 households in Sharonville, of which 24.6% had children under the age of 18 living in them. Of all households, 39.9% were married-couple households, 22.6% were households with a male householder and no spouse or partner present, and 30.4% were households with a female householder and no spouse or partner present. About 37.1% of all households were made up of individuals and 14.6% had someone living alone who was 65 years of age or older. The average household size was 2.11, and the average family size was 2.92.

The median age was 39.8 years; 20.1% of residents were under the age of 18, and 20.2% were 65 years of age or older. For every 100 females there were 92.9 males, and for every 100 females age 18 and over there were 91.2 males age 18 and over.

According to the U.S. Census American Community Survey, for the period 2016-2020 the estimated median annual income for a household in the city was $68,455, and the median income for a family was $76,055. About 7.9% of the population were living below the poverty line, including 6.5% of those under age 18 and 7.0% of those age 65 or over. About 63.4% of the population were employed, and 33.9% had a bachelor's degree or higher.

Racial composition as of the 2020 census
Race	Number	Percent
White	9,489	67.2%
Black or African American	1,327	9.4%
American Indian and Alaska Native	101	0.7%
Asian	1,116	7.9%
Native Hawaiian and Other Pacific Islander	39	0.3%
Some other race	1,044	7.4%
Two or more races	1,001	7.1%
Hispanic or Latino (of any race)	1,674	11.9%

=== 2010 census ===
As of the census of 2010, there were 13,560 people, 6,187 households, and 3,429 families living in the city. The population density was 1,379.5 inhabitants per square mile (532.6/km^{2}). There were 6,647 housing units at an average density of 676.2 per square mile (261.1/km^{2}). The racial makeup of the city was 79.7% White, 8.7% African American, 0.2% Native American, 4.0% Asian, 0.3% Pacific Islander, 4.1% from other races, and 3.0% from two or more races. Hispanic or Latino of any race were 7.0% of the population.

There were 6,187 households, of which 23.9% had children under the age of 18 living with them, 41.4% were married couples living together, 9.7% had a female householder with no husband present, 4.4% had a male householder with no wife present, and 44.6% were non-families. 37.8% of all households were made up of individuals, and 14.6% had someone living alone who was 65 years of age or older. The average household size was 2.17 and the average family size was 2.88.

The median age in the city was 40.8 years. 20% of residents were under the age of 18; 8% were between the ages of 18 and 24; 26.7% were from 25 to 44; 27.6% were from 45 to 64; and 17.6% were 65 years of age or older. The gender makeup of the city was 47.8% male and 52.2% female.

=== 2000 census ===
As of the census of 2000, there were 13,804 people, 6,211 households, and 3,589 families living in the city. The population density was 1,407.7 inhabitants per square mile (543.5/km^{2}). There were 6,526 housing units at an average density of 665.5 per square mile (257.0/km^{2}). The racial makeup of the city was 88.74% White, 4.82% African American, 0.12% Native American, 3.80% Asian, 0.02% Pacific Islander, 0.96% from other races, and 1.54% from two or more races. Hispanic or Latino of any race were 2.30% of the population.

There were 6,211 households, out of which 24.3% had children under the age of 18 living with them, 45.0% were married couples living together, 9.2% had a female householder with no husband present, and 42.2% were non-families. 36.5% of all households were made up of individuals, and 12.5% had someone living alone who was 65 years of age or older. The average household size was 2.17 and the average family size was 2.85.

In the city the population was spread out, with 20.6% under the age of 18, 7.8% from 18 to 24, 31.0% from 25 to 44, 23.5% from 45 to 64, and 17.1% who were 65 years of age or older. The median age was 39 years. For every 100 females, there were 92.7 males. For every 100 females age 18 and over, there were 88.7 males.

The median income for a household in the city was $47,055, and the median income for a family was $59,136. Males had a median income of $41,679 versus $29,391 for females. The per capita income for the city was $27,483. About 2.5% of families and 4.0% of the population were below the poverty line, including 3.8% of those under age 18 and 5.6% of those age 65 or over.

== Culture ==
Sharonville is home to the Heritage Village Museum, an open-air historic house museum.

== Education ==
Sharonville is home to Princeton High School, the secondary school of the Princeton City Schools, a consolidated school district encompassing the communities of Evendale, Glendale, Lincoln Heights, Sharonville, Springdale and Woodlawn. Other schools within Sharonville include Princeton Community Middle School, Sharonville Elementary School, Stewart Elementary School, Heritage Hill Elementary School and St. Michael Elementary school. Also, Scarlet Oaks (one of the four campuses of the Great Oaks Institute of Technology and Career Development) is located in Sharonville.

Sharonville is served by a branch of the Public Library of Cincinnati and Hamilton County.

== Economy ==
Sharonville's largest employer is Ford Motor Company's Sharonville Transmission Plant. The facility, which opened in 1958, produces complete automatic transmissions and gears for Ford assembly plants. The plant site covers 182 acres of land, and has 2.4 million square feet (220,000 m^{2}) of shop floor space. As of 2026, the facility employs approximately 2,043 employees. Approximately 1,823 of these employees are hourly.

Sharonville is also the home of Gorilla Glue's headquarters.

== Notable people ==
- Carmen Electra, actress and dancer
- Kelsey Mitchell, basketball player
- Tom Waddle, football analyst and former NFL player
- Spencer Ware, NFL Football Player
- Liz Wheeler, political commentary, analyst
