= Evendale, Ohio =

- Village
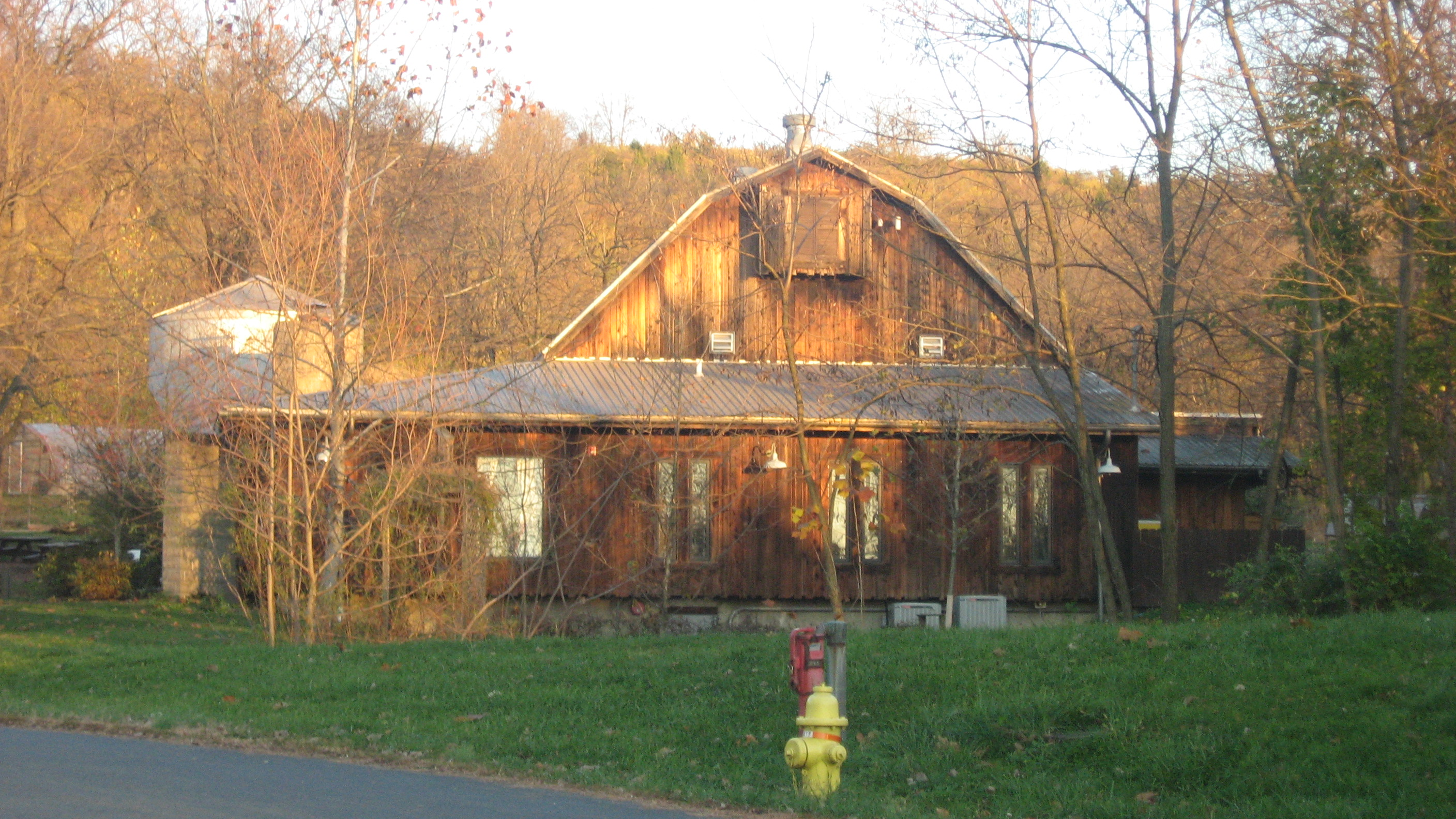
- Interpretive center at Gorman Heritage Farm

- Flag Seal

- Location in Hamilton County and the state of Ohio.
- Coordinates: 39°14′51″N 84°25′38″W
- Country: United States
- State: Ohio
- County: Hamilton

Government
  - Mayor: Richard Finan (R)

Area
  - Total: 4.77 sq mi (12.35 km^{2})
  - Land: 4.77 sq mi (12.35 km^{2})
  - Water: 0 sq mi (0.00 km^{2})
- Elevation: 571 ft (174 m)

Population (2020)
  - Total: 2,669
  - Estimate (2023): 2,630
  - Density: 560/sq mi (216.1/km^{2})
- Time zone: UTC-5 (Eastern (EST))
  - Summer (DST): UTC-4 (EDT)
- ZIP codes: 45215, 45241
- Area code: 513
- FIPS code: 39-25802
- GNIS feature ID: 1086208
- Website: www.evendaleohio.org

Evendale (pronounced /ˈiːvəndeɪl/ EE-vən-dayl) is a village in Hamilton County, Ohio, United States, within the Cincinnati metropolitan area. The population was 2,669 at the 2020 census.

== Geography ==
According to the United States Census Bureau, the village has a total area of 4.74 square miles (12.28 km^{2}), all land.

== Demographics ==
Historical population
Census	Pop.	Note	%±
1960	773		—
1970	1,967		154.5%
1980	1,954		−0.7%
1990	3,175		62.5%
2000	3,090		−2.7%
2010	2,767		−10.5%
2020	2,669		−3.5%
2023 (est.)	2,630	▼	−1.5%
Source: U.S. Census Bureau

=== 2020 census ===
As of the census of 2020, there were 2,669 people living in the village, for a population density of 559.66 people per square mile (216.10/km^{2}). There were 1,073 housing units. The racial makeup of the village was 83.9% White, 7.1% Black or African American, 0.0% Native American, 3.8% Asian, 0.0% Pacific Islander, 0.9% from some other race, and 4.3% from two or more races. 1.3% of the population were Hispanic or Latino of any race.

There were 940 households, out of which 31.4% had children under the age of 18 living with them, 78.4% were married couples living together, 6.0% had a male householder with no spouse present, and 15.2% had a female householder with no spouse present. 12.6% of all households were made up of individuals, and 8.4% were someone living alone who was 65 years of age or older. The average household size was 2.83, and the average family size was 3.06.

23.5% of the village's population were under the age of 18, 53.2% were 18 to 64, and 23.3% were 65 years of age or older. The median age was 47.2. For every 100 females, there were 93.2 males.

According to the U.S. Census American Community Survey, for the period 2016-2020 the estimated median annual income for a household in the village was $153,056, and the median income for a family was $169,125. About 2.7% of the population were living below the poverty line, including 3.2% of those under age 18 and 3.9% of those age 65 or over. About 56.4% of the population were employed, and 63.4% had a bachelor's degree or higher.

=== 2010 census ===
As of the census of 2010, there were 2,767 people, 1,063 households, and 877 families living in the village. The population density was 583.8 inhabitants per square mile (225.4/km^{2}). There were 1,098 housing units at an average density of 231.6 per square mile (89.4/km^{2}). The racial makeup of the village was 88.0% White, 6.5% African American, 0.3% Native American, 4.3% Asian, 0.3% from other races, and 0.6% from two or more races. Hispanic or Latino of any race were 0.4% of the population.

There were 1,063 households, of which 27.8% had children under the age of 18 living with them, 75.8% were married couples living together, 4.6% had a female householder with no husband present, 2.1% had a male householder with no wife present, and 17.5% were non-families. 15.6% of all households were made up of individuals, and 7.6% had someone living alone who was 65 years of age or older. The average household size was 2.60 and the average family size was 2.89.

The median age in the village was 50.3 years. 20.6% of residents were under the age of 18; 5.7% were between the ages of 18 and 24; 15.2% were from 25 to 44; 38.7% were from 45 to 64; and 19.6% were 65 years of age or older. The gender makeup of the village was 49.4% male and 50.6% female.

=== 2000 census ===
As of the census of 2000, there were 3,090 people, 1,062 households, and 921 families living in the village. The population density was 647.6 inhabitants per square mile (250.0/km^{2}). There were 1,077 housing units at an average density of 225.7 per square mile (87.1/km^{2}). The racial makeup of the village was 86.28% White, 7.22% African American, 5.37% Asian, 0.29% from other races, and 0.84% from two or more races. Hispanic or Latino of any race were 0.55% of the population.

There were 1,062 households, out of which 39.5% had children under the age of 18 living with them, 81.5% were married couples living together, 4.0% had a female householder with no husband present, and 13.2% were non-families. 11.3% of all households were made up of individuals, and 4.6% had someone living alone who was 65 years of age or older. The average household size was 2.91 and the average family size was 3.16.

In the village, the population was spread out, with 28.4% under the age of 18, 5.1% from 18 to 24, 20.6% from 25 to 44, 33.4% from 45 to 64, and 12.5% who were 65 years of age or older. The median age was 43 years. For every 100 females, there were 102.6 males. For every 100 females age 18 and over, there were 99.4 males.

The median income for a household in the village was $91,052, and the median income for a family was $101,493. Males had a median income of $75,479 versus $47,647 for females. The per capita income for the village was $41,734. None of the families and 0.3% of the population were living below the poverty line, including no under eighteens and none of those over 64.

== Economy ==
Major parts of the Evendale economy are GE Aerospace and Formica Corporation, which are headquartered in the village.

== Notable people ==
- Luke Kuechly – linebacker for the Carolina Panthers
- Vivek Ramaswamy – Republican candidate for President of the United States in 2024
- John Van Zandt – abolitionist in the Underground Railroad movement
