= Woodlawn, Ohio =

- Village
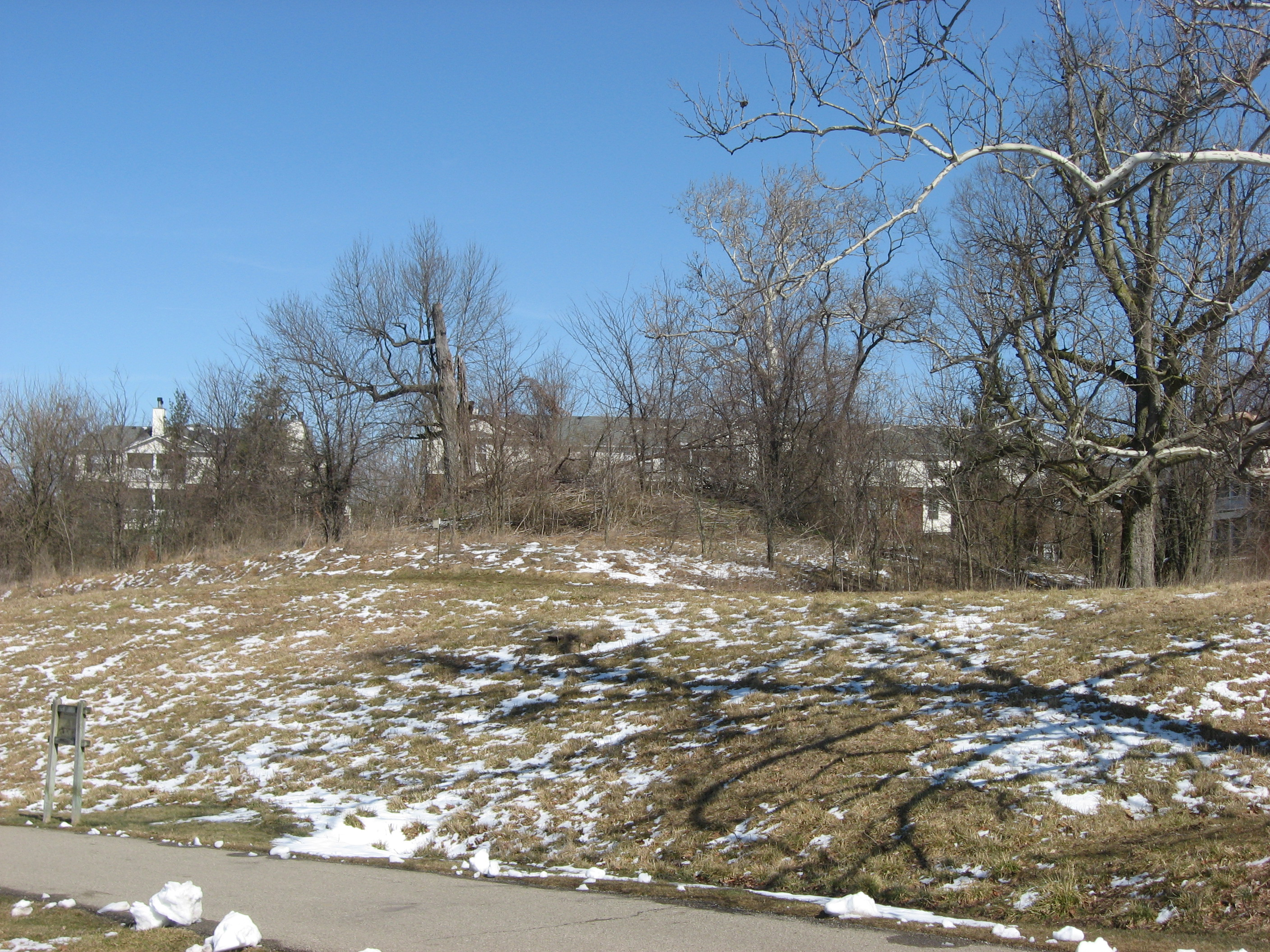
- Burchenal Mound in Glenwood Gardens Park

- Flag Logo

- Location in Hamilton County and the state of Ohio
- Coordinates: 39°15′06″N 84°28′20″W
- Country: United States
- State: Ohio
- County: Hamilton

Government
  - Mayor: Brian K. Poole (D)

Area
  - Total: 2.56 sq mi (6.62 km^{2})
  - Land: 2.56 sq mi (6.62 km^{2})
  - Water: 0 sq mi (0.00 km^{2})
- Elevation: 587 ft (179 m)

Population (2020)
  - Total: 3,916
  - Density: 1,532.4/sq mi (591.66/km^{2})
- Time zone: UTC-5 (Eastern (EST))
  - Summer (DST): UTC-4 (EDT)
- FIPS code: 39-86366
- GNIS feature ID: 1086236
- Website: www.beautifulwoodlawn.us

Woodlawn is a village in Hamilton County, Ohio, United States. The population was 3,916 at the 2020 census.

== History ==
Woodlawn was platted in 1876.

== Geography ==
According to the United States Census Bureau, the village has a total area of 2.57 square miles (6.66 km^{2}), all land.

== Demographics ==
Historical population
| Census | Pop. | Note | %± |
|---|---|---|---|
| 1950 | 1,335 | | — |
| 1960 | 1,007 | | −24.6% |
| 1970 | 3,251 | | 222.8% |
| 1980 | 2,715 | | −16.5% |
| 1990 | 2,674 | | −1.5% |
| 2000 | 2,816 | | 5.3% |
| 2010 | 3,294 | | 17.0% |
| 2020 | 3,916 | | 18.9% |
U.S. Decennial Census

=== Racial and ethnic composition ===
Woodlawn village, Ohio – Racial and ethnic composition Note: the US Census treats Hispanic/Latino as an ethnic category. This table excludes Latinos from the racial categories and assigns them to a separate category. Hispanics/Latinos may be of any race.
| Race / Ethnicity (NH = Non-Hispanic) | Pop 2000 | Pop 2010 | Pop 2020 | % 2000 | % 2010 | % 2020 |
|---|---|---|---|---|---|---|
| White alone (NH) | 748 | 833 | 1,058 | 26.56% | 22.29% | 27.02% |
| Black or African American alone (NH) | 1,921 | 2,203 | 2,282 | 68.22% | 66.88% | 57.27% |
| Native American or Alaska Native alone (NH) | 3 | 6 | 0 | 0.11% | 0.18% | 0.00% |
| Asian alone (NH) | 67 | 94 | 135 | 2.38% | 2.85% | 3.45% |
| Native Hawaiian or Pacific Islander alone (NH) | 0 | 3 | 0 | 0.00% | 0.09% | 0.00% |
| Other race alone (NH) | 12 | 2 | 25 | 0.43% | 0.06% | 0.64% |
| Mixed race or Multiracial (NH) | 29 | 76 | 162 | 1.03% | 2.31% | 4.14% |
| Hispanic or Latino (any race) | 36 | 77 | 254 | 1.28% | 2.34% | 6.49% |
| Total | 2,816 | 3,294 | 3,916 | 100.00% | 100.00% | 100.00% |

=== 2020 census ===
As of the 2020 census, there were 3,916 people living in the village, for a population density of 1,532.68 people per square mile (591.66/km^{2}). There were 1,984 housing units.

The median age was 35.8 years. 18.1% of residents were under the age of 18 and 16.4% were 65 years of age or older. For every 100 females, there were 86.2 males, and for every 100 females age 18 and over there were 83.2 males age 18 and over.

There were 1,819 households, of which 22.4% had children under the age of 18 living in them. Of all households, 24.2% were married-couple households, 25.6% were households with a male householder and no spouse or partner present, and 41.5% were households with a female householder and no spouse or partner present. About 40.0% of all households were made up of individuals and 11.5% had someone living alone who was 65 years of age or older. The average household size was 2.15, and the average family size was 3.20.

100.0% of residents lived in urban areas, while 0.0% lived in rural areas. Of all housing units, 8.3% were vacant; the homeowner vacancy rate was 0.2% and the rental vacancy rate was 7.1%.

=== Income and poverty ===
According to the U.S. Census American Community Survey, for the period 2016-2020 the estimated median annual income for a household in the village was $54,345, and the median income for a family was $73,417. About 19.0% of the population were living below the poverty line, including 27.4% of those under age 18 and 11.3% of those age 65 or over. About 65.1% of the population were employed, and 33.9% had a bachelor's degree or higher.

=== 2010 census ===
As of the census of 2010, there were 3,294 people, 1,507 households, and 766 families living in the village. The population density was 1,281.7 inhabitants per square mile (494.9/km^{2}). There were 1,668 housing units at an average density of 649.0 per square mile (250.6/km^{2}). The racial makeup of the village was 26.1% White, 67.2% African American, 0.2% Native American, 2.9% Asian, 0.1% Pacific Islander, 1.1% from other races, and 2.5% from two or more races. Hispanic or Latino of any race were 2.3% of the population.

There were 1,507 households, of which 24.2% had children under the age of 18 living with them, 26.7% were married couples living together, 18.8% had a female householder with no husband present, 5.2% had a male householder with no wife present, and 49.2% were non-families. 41.9% of all households were made up of individuals, and 7.9% had someone living alone who was 65 years of age or older. The average household size was 2.10 and the average family size was 2.93.

The median age in the village was 39.6 years. 18.9% of residents were under the age of 18; 10.6% were between the ages of 18 and 24; 27.7% were from 25 to 44; 26.9% were from 45 to 64; and 15.8% were 65 years of age or older. The gender makeup of the village was 45.0% male and 55.0% female.

=== 2000 census ===
As of the census of 2000, there were 2,816 people, 1,235 households, and 687 families living in the village. The population density was 1,089.3 inhabitants per square mile (420.6/km^{2}). There were 1,330 housing units at an average density of 514.5 per square mile (198.6/km^{2}). The racial makeup of the village was 27.10% White, 68.39% African American, 0.11% Native American, 2.38% Asian, 0.89% from other races, and 1.14% from two or more races. Hispanic or Latino of any race were 1.28% of the population.

There were 1,235 households, out of which 21.6% had children under the age of 18 living with them, 33.7% were married couples living together, 17.9% had a female householder with no husband present, and 44.3% were non-families. 37.1% of all households were made up of individuals, and 7.5% had someone living alone who was 65 years of age or older. The average household size was 2.27 and the average family size was 3.06.

In the village, the population was spread out, with 22.3% under the age of 18, 9.9% from 18 to 24, 32.2% from 25 to 44, 23.4% from 45 to 64, and 12.1% who were 65 years of age or older. The median age was 36 years. For every 100 females there were 95.4 males. For every 100 females age 18 and over, there were 91.7 males.

The median income for a household in the village was $42,978, and the median income for a family was $51,893. Males had a median income of $40,417 versus $31,142 for females. The per capita income for the village was $24,204. About 9.1% of families and 10.4% of the population were below the poverty line, including 18.6% of those under age 18 and 8.4% of those age 65 or over.
