= List of OHSAA championships =

The Ohio High School Athletic Association (OHSAA) is the governing body of athletic programs for junior and senior high schools in the U.S. state of Ohio. It conducts state championship competitions in all the OHSAA-sanctioned sports.

== Fall sports ==
- List of OHSAA cross country champions
- List of OHSAA field hockey champions
- List of OHSAA football champions
- List of OHSAA golf champions
- List of OHSAA soccer champions
- List of OHSAA girls' volleyball champions

== Winter sports ==
- List of OHSAA basketball champions
- List of OHSAA bowling champions
- List of OHSAA gymnastics champions
- List of OHSAA ice hockey champions
- List of OHSAA swimming and diving champions
- List of OHSAA wrestling champions

== Spring sports ==
- List of OHSAA baseball champions
- List of OHSAA flag football champions
- List of OHSAA lacrosse champions
- List of OHSAA softball champions
- List of OHSAA track and field champions
- List of OHSAA boys' volleyball champions

== Schools with most team titles ==
OHSAA teams with 15+ championships

Rank	# of titles	School	City	# of boys' titles	# of girls' titles	Year of first title	Year of last title	Totals by sport
1t	68	St. Edward	Lakewood	68	X*	1978	2025	Boys: 38 wrestling, 11 hockey, 7 football, 5 dual meet wrestling, 3 baseball, 2 track, 2 basketball
1t	68	St. Xavier	Cincinnati	68	X*	1957	2026	Boys: 44 swimming, 6 cross country, 5 golf, 4 football, 3 lacrosse, 2 baseball, 1 basketball, 1 bowling, 1 soccer, 1 volleyball
3	57	Upper Arlington	Upper Arlington	28	29	1937	2026	Boys: 17 golf, 3 swimming, 2 baseball, 2 track, 1 football, 1 basketball, 1 ice hockey, 1 lacrosse Girls: 15 swimming, 6 cross country, 4 lacrosse, 1 basketball, 1 gymnastics, 1 track
4	50	St. Ignatius	Cleveland	50	X*	1988	2025	Boys: 14 soccer, 11 football, 8 ice hockey, 4 cross country, 4 golf, 2 track, 2 baseball, 2 basketball, 1 wrestling, 1 volleyball, 1 bowling
5	43	Minster	Minster	9	34	1976	2024	Boys: 4 baseball, 3 football, 1 golf, 1 track Girls: 13 track, 17 cross country, 4 basketball
6	42	Hawken	Gates Mills	7	35	1977	2022	Boys: 4 swimming, 2 golf, 1 soccer Girls: 32 swimming, 2 track, 1 golf
7	40	Walsh Jesuit	Cuyahoga Falls	22	18	1982	2023	Boys: 8 wrestling, 4 golf, 4 baseball, 3 soccer, 2 cross country, 1 football Girls: 11 soccer, 3 golf, 3 softball, 1 basketball
8	37	Columbus Academy	Gahanna	20	17	1977	2026	Boys: 12 golf, 4 track, 2 football, 1 baseball, 1 soccer Girls: 12 field hockey, 5 golf
9	36	Graham	St. Paris	35	0	1930	2026	Boys: 27 wrestling, 7 dual meet wrestling, 2 baseball
10	35	St. Francis DeSales	Columbus	25	10	1971	2026	Boys: 7 soccer, 4 gymnastics, 3 wrestling, 3 football, 3 baseball, 3 lacrosse, 1 basketball, 1 volleyball Girls: 4 lacrosse, 4 soccer, 2 volleyball
11t	34	Thomas Worthington	Worthington	12	22	1938	2025	Boys: 3 golf, 3 soccer, 3 track, 1 baseball, 1 cross country, 1 gymnastics Girls: 10 field hockey, 5 gymnastics, 5 swimming, 2 cross country
11t	34	St.Vincent-St.Mary	Akron	23	11	1972	2022	Boys: 11 basketball, 6 football, 2 baseball, 2 track, 1 wrestling, 1 golf Girls: 5 cross country, 3 basketball, 2 softball, 1 track
13	33	Brecksville-Broadview Heights	Broadview Heights	5	28	1981	2026	Boys: 3 soccer, 1 football, 1 dual meet wrestling Girls: 26 gymnastics, 1 cross country, 1 volleyball
14t	31	Archbishop Alter	Kettering	20	11	1978	2025	Boys: 8 golf, 5 soccer, 4 basketball, 2 football, 1 cross country Girls: 5 basketball, 3 volleyball, 2 soccer, 1 cross country
14t	31	Coldwater	Coldwater	19	12	1983	2025	Boys: 7 baseball, 8 football, 4 bowling Girls: 5 bowling, 4 track, 2 basketball, 1 volleyball
16	28	Newark Catholic	Newark	17	11	1978	2025	Boys: 8 football, 9 baseball Girls: 9 volleyball, 1 basketball, 1 track
17t	27	Canton McKinley	Canton	23	4	1937	2010	Boys: 13 swimming, 3 football, 3 basketball, 2 baseball, 1 golf, 1 track Girls: 3 volleyball, 1 basketball
17t	27	Archbishop Moeller	Cincinnati	27	X*	1972	2026	Boys: 9 football, 9 baseball, 5 basketball, 2 volleyball, 1 golf, 1 lacrosse
19t	26	Marion Local	Maria Stein	20	6	1975	2024	Boys: 15 football, 3 basketball, 2 track Girls: 5 volleyball, 1 basketball
19t	26	Bishop Watterson	Columbus	18	8	1972	2026	Boys: 5 golf, 3 baseball, 3 football, 2 basketball, 2 wrestling, 2 soccer, 1 lacrosse Girls: 5 field hockey, 1 lacrosse, 1 soccer, 1 cross country
21	25	Archbishop Hoban	Akron	12	13	1980	2026	Boys: 5 football, 2 track, 2 golf, 2 basketball, 1 baseball Girls: 6 softball, 4 volleyball, 2 basketball, 1 soccer
22t	24	Beaumont School	Cleveland Heights	X	24	1986	2012	Girls: 16 track, 7 cross country, 1 volleyball
22t	24	East Technical	Cleveland	23	1	1920	2002	Boys: 13 track, 5 gymnastics3 basketball, 2 swimming Girls: 1 basketball
24t	23	St. Henry	St. Henry	15	8	1979	2026	Boys: 7 football, 4 basketball, 3 baseball, 1 bowling Girls: 7 volleyball, 1 basketball
24t	23	Dublin Jerome	Dublin	14	9	2004	2026	Boys: 10 golf, 3 lacrosse, 1 soccer Girls: 8 golf, 1 swimming
26t	22	Elder	Cincinnati	22	X*	1943	2005	Boys: 12 baseball, 5 cross country, 3 basketball, 2 football
26t	22	Glenville	Cleveland	22	0	1959	2026	Boys: 19 track, 3 football
28	21	Mount Notre Dame	Cincinnati	X*	21	1995	2021	Girls: 10 volleyball, 8 basketball, 2 golf, 1 soccer
29	20	St. Ursula Academy	Cincinnati	X*	20	1991	2024	Girls: 9 volleyball, 4 soccer, 3 swimming, 2 golf, 1 cross country, 1 field hockey
30t	19	Gilmour Academy	Gates Mills	8	11	1971	2026	Boys: 5 golf, 2 ice hockey, 1 track Girls: 4 track, 4 volleyball, 1 cross country, 1 soccer, 1 basketball
30t	19	Versailles	Versailles	8	11	1965	2026	Boys: 7 football, 1 baseball Girls: 4 volleyball 3 track, 2 cross country, 2 basketball
32t	18	Woodridge	Cuyahoga Falls	13	5	1995	2026	Boys: 12 cross country, 1 track Girls: 3 cross country, 2 track
32t	18	Summit Country Day	Cincinnati	12	6	1995	2025	Boys: 9 soccer, 1 baseball, 1 basketball, 1 cross country Girls: 6 soccer
32t	18	Centerville	Centerville	6	12	1928	2022	Boys: 1 basketball, 1 baseball, 1 gymnastics, 1 hockey, 1 soccer, 1 bowling Girls: 5 cross country, 2 bowling, 2 golf, 1 gymnastics, 1 swimming, 1 track
32t	18	Magnificat	Rocky River	X*	18	1990	2024	Girls: 10 gymnastics, 4 cross country, 2 track, 1 volleyball, 1 golf
32t	18	Beavercreek	Beavercreek	9	9	1941	2025	Boys: 3 baseball, 3 bowling, 1 soccer, 1 swimming, 1 cross country Girls: 3 basketball, 3 cross country, 2 bowling, 1 soccer
32t	18	University School	Hunting Valley	18	X*	1990	2026	Boys: 11 swimming, 5 golf, 2 hockey
38t	17	Bishop Hartley	Columbus	8	9	1976	2016	Boys: 4 football, 3 track, 1 baseball Girls: 5 track, 3 basketball, 1 volleyball
38t	17	Pickerington Central	Pickerington	8	9	1985	2025	Boys: 2 football, 3 track, 1 cross country, 2 basketball Girls: 8 basketball, 1 softball
38t	17	Mason	Mason	7	10	2000	2024	Boys: 5 cross country, 1 soccer, 1 baseball Girls: 3 golf, 3 cross country, 2 swimming, 1 basketball, 1 track
41t	16	Villa-Angela/St. Joseph	Cleveland	13	3	1965	2017	Boys: 7 basketball, 4 cross country, 1 football, 1 wrestling Girls: 2 volleyball, 1 basketball
41t	16	Dunbar	Dayton	15	1	1948	2017	Boys: 10 track, 5 basketball Girls: 1 basketball
41t	16	Cincinnati Ursuline Academy	Cincinnati	X*	16	1975	2022	Girls: 8 volleyball, 7 swimming, 1 golf
41t	16	Oakwood	Dayton	11	5	1929	2026	Boys: 6 golf, 3 track, 2 swimming 1 baseball, Girls: 3 track, 1 cross country, 1 tennis
41t	16	St. John's	Delphos	11	5	1949	2026	Boys: 6 football, 4 basketball, 1 baseball Girls: 5 basketball
46t	15	Hiland	Berlin	10	6	1992	2026	Boys: 4 baseball, 4 basketball, 2 golf Girls: 6 basketball
46t	15	Cleveland Heights	Cleveland Heights	11	4	1932	2008	Boys: 4 swimming, 3 track, 1 baseball, 1 basketball, 1 ice hockey, 1 wrestling Girls: 4 track
46t	15	Jefferson Township	Dayton	12	3	1957	2010	Boys: 9 track, 3 basketball Girls: 3 track
46t	15	Dublin Coffman	Dublin	7	8	1977	2021	Boys: 4 golf, 1 baseball, 1 cross country, 1 lacrosse Girls: 3 gymnastics, 2 soccer, 1 golf, 1 swimming, 1 lacrosse
46t	15	Fort Loramie	Fort Loramie	8	7	1977	2024	Boys: 3 basketball, 3 baseball, 2 cross country Girls: 4 basketball, 2 volleyball, 1 cross country
46t	15	Chaminade Juilenne	Dayton	9	6	1929	2026	Boys: 3 baseball, 2 basketball, 2 golf, 1 football, 1 soccer Girls: 4 basketball, 1 golf, 1 track and field

* X = single-sex school

== Schools with most team titles in one sport ==
Rank	# of titles	School	City	Sport	First	Last
1	44	St. Xavier	Cincinnati	Boys' swimming	1970	2024
2	38	St. Edward	Lakewood	Wrestling	1978	2025
3	32	Hawken	Gates Mills	Girls' swimming	1984	2022
4	27	Graham	St. Paris	Wrestling	1982	2026
5	26	Brecksville-Broadview Heights	Broadview Heights	Girls' gymnastics	1994	2026
6	19	Glenville	Cleveland	Boys' track	1959	2026
7t	17	Upper Arlington	Upper Arlington	Boys' golf	1941	2006
7t	17	Minster	Minster	Girls' cross country	1982	2025
9	16	Beaumont School	Cleveland Heights	Girls' track	1986	2008
10	15	Marion Local	Maria Stein	Football	2000	2024
11t	14	St. Ignatius	Cleveland	Soccer	2004	2024
11t	14	Upper Arlington	Upper Arlington	Girls' swimming	2003	2025
13t	13	Canton McKinley	Canton	Boys' swimming	1937	1961
13t	13	East Technical	Cleveland	Boys' track	1920	1955
13t	13	Minster	Minster	Girls' track	1976	2018
16t	12	Columbus Academy	Gahanna	Field hockey	1994	2019
16t	12	Columbus Academy	Gahanna	Boys' golf	1983	2021
16t	12	Elder	Cincinnati	Baseball	1943	2005
19t	11	St. Edward	Lakewood	Ice hockey	1985	2008
19t	11	St. Ignatius	Cleveland	Football	1988	2011
19t	11	Walsh Jesuit	Cuyahoga Falls	Girls' soccer	2000	2023
19t	11	Woodridge	Peninsula	Boys' cross country	2006	2025
19t	11	University School	Hunting Valley	Boys' swimming	2009	2026
19t	11	Dublin Jerome	Dublin	Boys' golf	2004	2026
25t	10	Strasburg-Franklin	Strasburg	Girls' softball	1987	2024
25t	10	Maple Heights	Maple Heights	Wrestling	1956	1974
25t	10	Magnificat	Rocky River	Girls' gymnastics	1990	2003
25t	10	Dunbar	Dayton	Boys' track	1948	2017
25t	10	Mount Notre Dame	Cincinnati	Girls' volleyball	1995	2020
25t	10	St. Vincent–St. Mary	Akron	Boys' basketball	1984	2022
25t	10	Thomas Worthington	Worthington	Girls' field hockey	1988	2025

== Schools with most team titles in one school year ==
# of titles	School year	School	City	Sports
4	2025–2026	Columbus Bishop Watterson	Columbus	Girls cross country, boys soccer, football, boys wrestling
4	2025–2026	Avon	Avon	Football, boys soccer, girls volleyball, girls track and field
4	2024–2025	Bishop Watterson	Columbus	Boys' football, boys' lacrosse, boys' wrestling, girls' soccer
4	2017–2018	Minster	Minster	Boys' football, girls' cross country, girls' basketball, girls' track
4	2015–2016	St. Ignatius	Cleveland	Cross country, soccer, ice hockey, track
4	1986–1987	Upper Arlington	Upper Arlington	Boys' golf, baseball, swimming, girls' cross country
3	2025–2026	St. Henry	St. Henry	Boys' bowling, girls' basketball, football
3	2025–2026	Dublin Jerome	Dublin	Boys' soccer, girls' golf, boys' golf
3	2024–2025	Coldwater	Coldwater	Boys' football, girls' volleyball, girls' track
3	2023–2024	St. Ignatius	Cleveland	Boys' soccer, ice hockey, basketball
3	2021–2022	New Albany	New Albany	Girls' lacrosse, girls' golf, girls' swimming
3	2020–2021	Mariemont	Cincinnati	Boys' lacrosse, girls' lacrosse, boys' soccer
3	2020–2021	Archbishop Hoban	Akron	Football, boys' golf, baseball
3	2020–2021	New Albany	New Albany	Girls' golf, girls' swimming, baseball
3	2018–2019	St. Edward	Lakewood	Wrestling, dual meet wrestling, football
3	2017–2018	Pickerington Central	Pickerington	Football, girls' basketball, boys' track
3	2016–2017	St. Xavier	Cincinnati	Football, boys' golf, and boys' swimming
3	2016–2017	Archbishop Alter	Kettering	Boys' soccer, girls' soccer, girls' basketball
3	2015–2016	St. Edward	Lakewood	Wrestling, dual meet wrestling, football
3	2015–2016	St. Thomas Aquinas	Louisville	Boys' track, girls' track, cross country
3	2014–2015	Coldwater	Coldwater	Football, Boys' bowling, girls' bowling
3	2012–2013	St. Edward	Lakewood	Boys' wrestling, dual meet wrestling, boys' track
3	2012–2013	St. Vincent – St. Mary	Akron	Football, girls' cross country, boys' track
3	2010–2011	St. Vincent – St. Mary	Akron	Boys' cross country, boys' basketball, girls' track
3	2008–2009	University School	Hunting Valley	Ice hockey, boys' swimming, boys' golf
3	2007–2008	St. Edward	Lakewood	Wrestling, ice hockey, baseball
3	2004–2005	Walsh Jesuit	Cuyahoga Falls	Girls' soccer, girls' golf, girls' basketball
3	2001–2002	St. Ignatius	Cleveland	Football, boys' golf, baseball
3	2001–2002	Walsh Jesuit	Cuyahoga Falls	Girls' soccer, girls' golf and softball
3	1998–1999	Archbishop Alter	Kettering	Boys' soccer, boys' golf and basketball
3	1997–1998	St. Edward	Lakewood	Wrestling, boys' basketball, baseball
3	1997–1998	St. Francis De Sales	Columbus	Football, boys' soccer, girls' soccer
3	1996–1997	Benedictine	Cleveland	Football, boys' basketball, boys' track
3	1994–1995	St. Ursula Academy	Cincinnati	Girls' golf, volleyball, girls' swimming
3	1993–1994	St. Ursula Academy	Cincinnati	Girls' soccer, volleyball and girls' swimming
3	1991–1992	Archbishop Hoban	Akron	Boys' track, volleyball, softball
3	1990–1991	St. Henry	St. Henry	Football, boys' basketball, girls' volleyball
3	1990–1991	Walsh Jesuit	Cuyahoga Falls	Wrestling, boys' soccer, boys' golf
3	1988–1989	Thomas Worthington	Worthington	Field hockey, girls' gymnastics, girls' swimming
3	1985–1986	Upper Arlington	Upper Arlington	Boys' golf, boys' swimming, girls' cross country
3	1981–1982	Roosevelt	Kent	Boys' cross country, ice hockey, field hockey
3	1928–1929	Central	Columbus	Boys' gymnastics, boys' track, baseball

== Schools with boys' and girls' state titles in the same (or a similar) sport in the same year ==
School year	School	City	Sport
2025–26	Columbus Grove	Columbus	Track and field
2025–26	Summit Country Day	Cincinnati	Soccer
2025–26	Dublin Jerome	Dublin	Golf
2024–25	Summit Country Day	Cincinnati	Soccer
2023–24	Olentangy Liberty	Powell	Lacrosse
2023–24	St. Francis DeSales	Columbus	Lacrosse
2022–23	Mason	Mason	Cross country
2020–21	Mariemont	Cincinnati	Lacrosse
2020–21	Hawken	Gates Mills	Swimming
2018–19	St. Marys Memorial	St. Marys	Bowling
2017–18	Summit Country Day	Cincinnati	Soccer
2017–18	Lexington	Lexington	Cross country
2016–17	Champion	Champion	Baseball/softball
2016–17	Hawken	Gates Mills	Swimming
2016–17	Woodridge	Cuyahoga Falls	Cross country
2016–17	Archbishop Alter	Kettering	Soccer
2015–16	St. Thomas Aquinas	Louisville	Track
2015–16	Lexington	Lexington	Cross country
2015–16	Summit Country Day	Cincinnati	Soccer
2014–15	Coldwater	Coldwater	Bowling
2013–14	Dublin Jerome	Dublin	Golf
2012–13	Dublin Jerome	Dublin	Golf
2011–12	Coldwater	Coldwater	Bowling
2011–12	Dublin Jerome	Dublin	Golf
2006–07	Walsh Jesuit	Cuyahoga Falls	Soccer
2005–06	Jerome	Dublin	Golf
2005–06	Salem	Salem	Cross country
2003–04	Walsh Jesuit	Cuyahoga Falls	Baseball/softball
2002–03	Marion Local	Maria Stein	Basketball
2002–03	Shelby	Shelby	Track
2001–02	St. John's	Delphos	Basketball
1997–98	Columbus St. Francis DeSales	Columbus	Soccer
1997–98	Field	Brimfield	Cross country
1993–94	Upper Scioto Valley	McGuffey	Basketball
1988–89	Northmont	Clayton	Soccer
1987–88	Hawken	Gates Mills	Swimming
1986–87	Turpin	Cincinnati	Soccer
1985–86	Columbus Bishop Hartley	Columbus	Track

== Schools with most consecutive titles in one sport ==
# of titles	School	City	Sport	Years
25	Graham	St. Paris	Wrestling	2001–2026 (current) No tournament in 2020
24	Hawken	Gates Mills	Girls' swimming	1999–2022
23	Brecksville-Broadview Heights	Broadview Heights	Girls' gymnastics	2004–2026 (current)
13	St. Xavier	Cincinnati	Boys' swimming	2009–2021
13	St. Edward	Lakewood	Wrestling	1997–2009
12	St. Xavier	Cincinnati	Boys' swimming	1970–1981
10	St. Edward	Lakewood	Wrestling	1978–1987
10	St. Edward	Lakewood	Wrestling	2015–2025 No tournament in 2020
9	St. Xavier	Cincinnati	Boys' swimming	1999–2007
8	Upper Arlington	Upper Arlington	Girls' swimming	2005–2012
8	Caldwell	Caldwell	Boys' cross country	1985–1992
7	Beaumont School	Cleveland Heights	Girls' track	1986–1992
7	Graham	St. Paris	Dual meet wrestling	2013–2019
6	St. Ursula Academy	Cincinnati	Volleyball	1993–1998
6	St. Xavier	Cincinnati	Boys' swimming	1990–1995
6	Canton McKinley	Canton	Boys' swimming	1956–1961
6	East Technical	Cleveland	Boys' track	1939–1944
6	St. Ignatius	Cleveland	Boys' soccer	2019–2024
5	Columbus Academy	Gahanna	Girls' golf	2022–2026 (current)
5	University School	Hunting Valley	Boys swimming	2022–2026 (current)
5	Columbus Academy	Gahanna	Boys' golf	2017–2021
5	Walsh Jesuit	Cuyahoga Falls	Girls' soccer	2012–2016
5	Jerome	Dublin	Girls' golf	2011–2015
5	St. Vincent – St. Mary	Akron	Girls' cross country	2009–2013
5	Hathaway Brown	Shaker Heights	Girls' basketball	2009–2013
5	Woodridge	Cuyahoga Falls	Boys' cross country	2006–2010
5	Glenville	Cleveland	Boys' track	2003–2007
5	St. Mary Central Catholic	Sandusky	Boys wrestling	2002–2006
5	Collinwood	Cleveland	Girls' track	1997–2001
5	Hopewell-Loudon	Bascom	Volleyball	1997–2001
5	Walsh Jesuit	Cuyahoga Falls	Wrestling	1993–1997
5	St. Ignatius	Cleveland	Football	1991–1995
5	Thomas Worthington	Worthington	Girls' gymnastics	1985–1989
5	Hawken	Gates Mills	Girls' swimming	1984–1988
5	Minster	Minster	Girls' track	1976–1980
5	East Technical	Cleveland	Boys' gymnastics	1933–1937
4	Lutheran East	Cleveland	Boys basketball	2023–2026 (current)
4	Lake Catholic	Mentor	Volleyball	2022–2025 (current)
4	New Albany	New Albany	Girls' golf	2018–2021
4	Lima Central Catholic	Lima	Girls' golf	2018–2021
4	Minster	Minster	Girls' cross country	2016–2019
4	Lexington	Lexington	Girls' cross country	2017–2020
4	St. Ignatius	Cleveland	Ice hockey	2016–2019
4	Archbishop Hoban	Akron	Football	2015–2018
4	Summit Country Day	Cincinnati	Boys' soccer	2015–2018
4	Centerville	Centerville	Girls' cross country	2014–2017
4	Delta	Delta	Dual meet wrestling	2013–2016
4	Coldwater	Coldwater	Football	2012–2015
4	Marion Local	Maria Stein	Football	2011–2014
4	Hoover	North Canton	Softball	2011–2014
4	University School	Hunting Valley	Boys' swimming	2009–2012
4	Reynoldsburg	Reynoldsburg	Girls' track	2009–2012
4	Cincinnati Mount Notre Dame	Reading	Girls' basketball	2006–2009
4	Minster	Minster	Girls' track	2001–2004
4	Regina	South Euclid	Girls' basketball	2000–2003
4	Colerain	Cincinnati	Girls' cross country	1997–2000
4	Magnificat	Rocky River	Girls' gymnastics	1996–1999
4	Beaumont School	Cleveland Heights	Girls' track	1996–1999
4	Beaumont School	Cleveland Heights	Girls' cross country	1993–1996
4	Springfield	Lakemore	Girls' softball	1992–1995
4	Gilmour Academy	Gates Mills	Boys' golf	1991–1994
4	Magnificat	Rocky River	Girls' gymnastics	1990–1993
4	St. Francis DeSales	Columbus	Boys' gymnastics	1990–1993
4	St Mary Central Catholic	Sandusky	Girls' cross country	1987–1990
4	Newark Catholic	Newark	Football	1984–1987
4	West Liberty-Salem	West Liberty	Boys' cross country	1976–1979
4	Maple Heights	Maple Heights	Boys' wrestling	1966–1969
4	Glenville	Cleveland	Boys' track	1965–1968
4	John Hay	Cleveland	Wrestling	1938–1941
4	Central	Columbus	Boys' track	1927–1930

== See also ==
- List of high schools in Ohio
- Ohio High School Athletic Association
- Ohio high school athletic conferences
