= List of OHSAA soccer champions =

The Ohio High School Athletic Association (OHSAA) is the governing body of athletic programs for junior and senior high schools in the state of Ohio. It conducts state championship competitions in all the OHSAA-sanctioned sports. The soccer coaches sponsored a state tournament prior to 1976 with Finneytown winning in 1974 and Brecksville in 1975.

== Boys' soccer champions ==
Year	Boys D I / AAA	Boys D II / AA	Boys D III	Boys D IV	Boys D V
2026	Kettering Fairmont	Avon	Columbus Bishop Watterson	Wyoming	Milford Center Fairbanks
2025	Dublin Jerome	Avon	Columbus Bishop Watterson	Worthington Christian	Cincinnati Summit Country Day
2024	Cleveland St. Ignatius	New Albany	Cincinnati Indian Hill	Warsaw River View	Cincinnati Summit Country Day
2023	Cleveland St. Ignatius	Tipp City Tippecanoe	Willoughby Andrews Osborne		
2022	Cleveland St. Ignatius	Lima Shawnee	Columbus Grandview Heights		
2021	Cleveland St. Ignatius	Cincinnati Wyoming	Columbus Grandview Heights		
2020	Cleveland St. Ignatius	Howland	Cincinnati Mariemont		
2019	Cleveland St. Ignatius	Tipp City Tippecanoe	The Wellington School		
2018	Medina	Cincinnati Summit Country Day	Archbold		
2017	Beavercreek	Columbus St. Francis DeSales	Cincinnati Summit Country Day		
2016	Cleveland St. Ignatius	Kettering Archbishop Alter	Cincinnati Summit Country Day		
2015	Cleveland St. Ignatius	Columbus St. Francis DeSales	Cincinnati Summit Country Day		
2014	Cleveland St. Ignatius	Columbus St. Francis DeSales	Mansfield Christian School		
2013	Mason	Revere	Cincinnati Summit Country Day		
2012	Powell Olentangy Liberty	Dayton Carroll	Cincinnati Summit Country Day		
2011	Cleveland St. Ignatius	Dayton Carroll	Worthington Christian		
2010	Cleveland St. Ignatius	Dayton Carroll	Cuyahoga Falls Cuyahoga Valley Christian Academy		
2009	Gahanna Lincoln	Columbus St. Francis DeSales	Worthington Christian		
2008	Cleveland St. Ignatius	Dayton Carroll	Toledo Ottawa Hills		
2007	Hilliard Davidson	Cuyahoga Falls Cuyahoga Valley Christian Academy	Springfield Catholic Central		
2006	Stow-Munroe Falls	Cuyahoga Falls Walsh Jesuit	Worthington Christian		
2005	Cleveland St. Ignatius	Bexley	Jamestown Greeneview		
2004	Cleveland St. Ignatius	Pataskala Watkins Memorial	Cuyahoga Falls Cuyahoga Valley Christian Academy		
2003	Westerville North	Bexley	Cincinnati Madeira		
2002	Hudson	Youngstown Cardinal Mooney	Cincinnati Madeira		
2001	Thomas Worthington	Cincinnati Turpin	Springfield Catholic Central		
2000	Worthington Kilbourne	Cincinnati Turpin	Gates Mills Hawken		
1999	North Olmsted	Cincinnati Summit Country Day			
1998	Thomas Worthington	Kettering Archbishop Alter			
1997	Strongsville	Columbus St. Francis DeSales			
1996	North Olmsted	Kettering Archbishop Alter			
1995	Westerville North	Gahanna Columbus Academy			
1994	Mentor	Copley			
1993	Brecksville-Broadview Heights	Bay Village Bay			
1992	Brecksville-Broadview Heights	Columbus St. Francis DeSales			
1991	Thomas Worthington	Bay Village Bay			
1990	Cuyahoga Falls Walsh Jesuit	St. Bernard Roger Bacon			
1989	Westerville South	St. Bernard Roger Bacon			
1988	Clayton Northmont	Kettering Archbishop Alter			
1987	Kettering Archbishop Alter	Chagrin Falls Kenston			
1986	Cincinnati Turpin	Columbus St. Francis DeSales			
1985	North Olmsted	Columbus St. Charles			
1984	Centerville	Cincinnati Archbishop McNicholas			
1983	Cincinnati St. Xavier	Columbus St. Charles			
1982	Cuyahoga Falls Walsh Jesuit	Dayton Chaminade-Julienne			
1981	Brecksville-Broadview Heights	Cincinnati Finneytown			
1980	Dayton Carroll				
1979	North Royalton				
1978	Clayton Northmont				
1977	North Olmsted				
1976	Cincinnati Finneytown				

== Girls' soccer champions ==
Year	Girls D I	Girls D II	Girls D III	Girls D IV	Girls D V
2026	Cincinnati Seton	Hudson	Cincinnati Indian Hill	Cincinnati Mariemont	Toledo Ottowa Hills
2025	Upper Arlington	Whitehouse Anthony Wayne	Bay Village Bay	Cincinnati Summit Country Day	Madeira
2024	Springboro	Columbus Bishop Watterson	Bay Village Bay	Cincinnati Summit Country Day	Madeira
2023	Cuyahoga Falls Walsh Jesuit	Cincinnati Summit Country Day	Cincinnati Country Day		
2022	Cincinnati Seton	Copley	Cincinnati Country Day		
2021	Cincinnati Mount Notre Dame	Chagrin Falls	Waynesville		
2020	Strongsville	Mansfield Madison	Kirtland		
2019	West Chester Lakota West	Kettering Archbishop Alter	Cincinnati Country Day		
2018	Beavercreek	Cincinnati Indian Hill	Cincinnati Country Day		
2017	Loveland	Cincinnati Indian Hill	Cincinnati Summit Country Day		
2016	Cuyahoga Falls Walsh Jesuit	Kettering Archbishop Alter	Gates Mills Gilmour		
2015	Cuyahoga Falls Walsh Jesuit	Akron Archbishop Hoban	Cincinnati Summit Country Day		
2014	Cuyahoga Falls Walsh Jesuit	Cincinnati Archbishop McNicholas	Hamilton Badin		
2013	Cuyahoga Falls Walsh Jesuit	Rocky River	Hamilton Badin		
2012	Perrysburg	Cuyahoga Falls Walsh Jesuit	Franklin Bishop Fenwick		
2011	Strongsville	Columbus St. Francis De Sales	Cincinnati Summit Country Day		
2010	Cuyahoga Falls Walsh Jesuit	Cincinnati Madeira			
2009	Medina	Columbus Bexley *			
2008	Cincinnati St. Ursula Academy	Franklin Bishop Fenwick			
2007	Cincinnati St. Ursula Academy	Shaker Heights Hathaway Brown			
2006	Cuyahoga Falls Walsh Jesuit	Parma Heights Holy Name			
2005	Strongsville	Hamilton Badin			
2004	Cuyahoga Falls Walsh Jesuit	Shaker Heights Hathaway Brown			
2003	Dublin Coffman	Bay Village Bay			
2002	Strongsville	Bay Village Bay			
2001	Dublin Coffman	Cuyahoga Falls Walsh Jesuit			
2000	Hudson	Cuyahoga Falls Walsh Jesuit			
1999	West Chester Lakota West	Bay Village Bay			
1998	Strongsville	Columbus St. Francis DeSales			
1997	Medina	Columbus St. Francis DeSales			
1996	Cincinnati Turpin	Chagrin Falls			
1995	Westerville South	Columbus St. Francis DeSales			
1994	Westerville South				
1993	Cincinnati St. Ursula Academy				
1992	Westerville North				
1991	Cincinnati St. Ursula Academy				
1990	Westerville North				
1989	Clayton Northmont				
1988	Clayton Northmont				
1987	Clayton Northmont				
1986	Cincinnati Turpin				
1985	Clayton Northmont				

- 2009 Girls D 3 Title game was won by Hathaway Brown (Shaker Heights), but later forfeited due to the use of an ineligible player. It was just the third state championship game forfeiture in the history of the OHSAA.

== See also ==
- List of Ohio High School Athletic Association championships
- List of high schools in Ohio
- Ohio High School Athletic Conferences
- Ohio High School Athletic Association
