= List of OHSAA swimming and diving champions =

The Ohio High School Athletic Association (OHSAA) is the governing body of athletic programs for junior and senior high schools in the state of Ohio. It conducts state championship competitions in all the OHSAA-sanctioned sports.

== Boys' swimming and diving champions ==
Year	Boys D I	Boys D II
2026	Columbus St. Charles	Hunting Valley University School
2025	Columbus St. Charles	Hunting Valley University School
2024	Cincinnati St. Xavier	Hunting Valley University School
2023	Cincinnati St. Xavier	Hunting Valley University School
2022	Beavercreek	Hunting Valley University School
2021	Cincinnati St. Xavier	Gates Mills Hawken
2020	Cincinnati St. Xavier	Cincinnati Indian Hill
2019	Cincinnati St. Xavier	Hunting Valley University School
2018	Cincinnati St. Xavier	Hunting Valley University School
2017	Cincinnati St. Xavier	Gates Mills Hawken
2016	Cincinnati St. Xavier	Cincinnati Seven Hills
2015	Cincinnati St. Xavier	Cincinnati Seven Hills
2014	Cincinnati St. Xavier	Dayton Oakwood
2013	Cincinnati St. Xavier	Dayton Oakwood
2012	Cincinnati St. Xavier	Hunting Valley University School
2011	Cincinnati St. Xavier	Hunting Valley University School
2010	Cincinnati St. Xavier	Hunting Valley University School
2009	Cincinnati St. Xavier	Hunting Valley University School
2008	Columbus St. Charles	
2007	Cincinnati St. Xavier	
2006	Cincinnati St. Xavier	
2005	Cincinnati St. Xavier	
2004	Cincinnati St. Xavier	
2003	Cincinnati St. Xavier	
2002	Cincinnati St. Xavier	
2001	Cincinnati St. Xavier	
2000	Cincinnati St. Xavier	
1999	Cincinnati St. Xavier	
1998	Toledo St. Francis De Sales	
1997	Cincinnati St. Xavier	
1996	Toledo St. Francis De Sales	
1995	Cincinnati St. Xavier	
1994	Cincinnati St. Xavier	
1993	Cincinnati St. Xavier	
1992	Cincinnati St. Xavier	
1991	Cincinnati St. Xavier	
1990	Cincinnati St. Xavier	
1989	Gates Mills Hawken	
1988	Gates Mills Hawken	
1987	Upper Arlington	
1986	Upper Arlington	
1985	Upper Arlington	
1984	Cincinnati St. Xavier	
1983	Akron Firestone	
1982	Akron Firestone	
1981	Cincinnati St. Xavier	
1980	Cincinnati St. Xavier	
1979	Cincinnati St. Xavier	
1978	Cincinnati St. Xavier	
1977	Cincinnati St. Xavier	
1976	Cincinnati St. Xavier	
1975	Cincinnati St. Xavier	
1974	Cincinnati St. Xavier	
1973	Cincinnati St. Xavier	
1972	Cincinnati St. Xavier	
1971	Cincinnati St. Xavier	
1970	Cincinnati St. Xavier	
1969	Akron Firestone	
1968	Toledo St. Francis De Sales	
1967	Toledo St. Francis De Sales	
1966	Akron Firestone	
1965	Cleveland Heights	
1964	Fairview Park Fairview	
1963	Akron Buchtel	
1962	Lakewood	
1961	Canton McKinley	
1960	Canton McKinley	
1959	Canton McKinley	
1958	Canton McKinley	
1957	Canton McKinley	
1956	Canton McKinley	
1955	Cincinnati Walnut Hills	
1954	Shaker Heights	
1953	Fremont Ross	
1952	Canton McKinley	
1951	Canton McKinley	
1950	Cincinnati Walnut Hills	
1949	Canton McKinley	
1948	Cleveland East Technical	
1947	Cleveland East Technical	
1946	Sandusky	
1945	Canton McKinley	
1944	Findlay	
1943	Fremont Ross	
1942	Fremont Ross	
1941	Fremont Ross	
1940	Canton McKinley	
1939	Canton McKinley & Fremont Ross *	
1938	Fremont Ross	
1937	Canton McKinley	
1936	Fremont Ross	
1935	Cincinnati Western Hills	
1934	Cleveland Heights	
1933	Cleveland Heights	
1932	Cleveland Heights	
1931	Cincinnati YMCA Prep	
1930	Cincinnati Hughes Center	
1929	Lakewood	
1928	Lakewood	

* Tie

== Girl's swimming and diving champions ==
Year	Girls D I	Girls D II
2026	Upper Arlington	Shaker Heights Hathaway Brown
2025	Upper Arlington	Shaker Heights Hathaway Brown
2024	Upper Arlington	Shaker Heights Hathaway Brown
2023	Dublin Jerome	Shaker Heights Hathaway Brown
2022	New Albany	Gates Mills Hawken
2021	New Albany	Gates Mills Hawken
2020	Dublin Coffman	Gates Mills Hawken
2019	Mason	Gates Mills Hawken
2018	Mason	Gates Mills Hawken
2017	Upper Arlington	Gates Mills Hawken
2016	Upper Arlington	Gates Mills Hawken
2015	Upper Arlington	Gates Mills Hawken
2014	Cincinnati Ursuline Academy	Gates Mills Hawken
2013	Cincinnati Ursuline Academy	Gates Mills Hawken
2012	Upper Arlington	Gates Mills Hawken
2011	Upper Arlington	Gates Mills Hawken
2010	Upper Arlington	Gates Mills Hawken
2009	Upper Arlington	Gates Mills Hawken
2008	Upper Arlington	Gates Mills Hawken
2007	Upper Arlington	Gates Mills Hawken
2006	Upper Arlington	Gates Mills Hawken
2005	Upper Arlington	Gates Mills Hawken
2004	Centerville	Gates Mills Hawken
2003	Upper Arlington	Gates Mills Hawken
2002	Cincinnati Ursuline Academy	Gates Mills Hawken
2001	Cincinnati Ursuline Academy	Gates Mills Hawken
2000	Cincinnati Ursuline Academy	Gates Mills Hawken
1999	Gates Mills Hawken	
1998	Cincinnati Ursuline Academy	
1997	Gates Mills Hawken	
1996	Gates Mills Hawken	
1995	Cincinnati St. Ursula Academy	
1994	Cincinnati St. Ursula Academy	
1993	Cincinnati St. Ursula Academy	
1992	Cincinnati Sycamore	
1991	Cincinnati Ursuline Academy	
1990	Gates Mills Hawken	
1989	Thomas Worthington	
1988	Gates Mills Hawken	
1987	Gates Mills Hawken	
1986	Gates Mills Hawken	
1985	Gates Mills Hawken	
1984	Gates Mills Hawken	
1983	Toledo St. Ursula Academy	
1982	GlenOak & Cincinnati Oak Hills *	
1981	Thomas Worthington	
1980	Thomas Worthington	
1979	Cincinnati Finneytown	
1978	Thomas Worthington	
1977	Thomas Worthington	

== See also ==
- List of Ohio High School Athletic Association championships
- List of high schools in Ohio
- Ohio High School Athletic Conferences
- Ohio High School Athletic Association
