= List of OHSAA field hockey champions =

The Ohio High School Athletic Association (OHSAA) is the governing body of athletic programs for junior and senior high schools in the state of Ohio. It conducts state championship competitions in all the OHSAA-sanctioned sports.

== Champions ==
Year	Champion
2026	Upper Arlington
2025	Worthington Thomas Worthington
2024	Worthington Thomas Worthington
2023	Worthington Thomas Worthington
2022	Worthington Thomas Worthington
2021	Columbus Bishop Watterson
2020	Columbus Bishop Watterson
2019	Gahanna Columbus Academy
2018	Gahanna Columbus Academy
2017	Worthington Thomas Worthington
2016	Worthington Thomas Worthington
2015	Worthington Thomas Worthington
2014	Shaker Heights
2013	Gahanna Columbus Academy
2012	Gahanna Columbus Academy
2011	Worthington Thomas Worthington
2010	Cincinnati St. Ursula Academy
2009	Columbus Bishop Watterson
2008	Shaker Heights Hathaway Brown School
2007	Worthington Thomas Worthington
2006	Gahanna Columbus Academy
2005	Columbus Bishop Watterson
2004	Gahanna Columbus Academy
2003	Gahanna Columbus Academy
2002	Shaker Heights Hathaway Brown School
2001	Gahanna Columbus Academy
2000	Gahanna Columbus Academy
1999	Gahanna Columbus Academy
1998	Toledo Ottawa Hills
1997	Gahanna Columbus Academy
1996	Hudson
1995	Columbus Bishop Watterson
1994	Gahanna Columbus Academy
1993	Toledo Ottawa Hills
1992	Toledo Ottawa Hills
1991	Shaker Heights
1990	Kettering Fairmont
1989	Kettering Fairmont
1988	Worthington Thomas Worthington
1987	Columbus School for Girls
1986	Hudson
1985	Kettering Fairmont
1984	Hudson
1983	Kettering Fairmont
1982	Kettering Fairmont West
1981	Kent Roosevelt
1980	Kettering Fairmont West
1979	Kettering Fairmont West

== See also ==
- List of Ohio High School Athletic Association championships
- List of high schools in Ohio
- Ohio High School Athletic Conferences
- Ohio High School Athletic Association
