= List of OHSAA gymnastics champions =

The Ohio High School Athletic Association (OHSAA) is the governing body of athletic programs for junior and senior high schools in the state of Ohio. It conducts state championship competitions in all the OHSAA-sanctioned sports.

== Girls' gymnastic champions ==
Year	Girls champions
2026	Brecksville-Broadview Heights
2025	Brecksville-Broadview Heights
2024	Brecksville-Broadview Heights
2023	Brecksville-Broadview Heights
2022	Brecksville-Broadview Heights
2021	Brecksville-Broadview Heights
2020	Brecksville-Broadview Heights
2019	Brecksville-Broadview Heights
2018	Brecksville-Broadview Heights
2017	Brecksville-Broadview Heights
2016	Brecksville-Broadview Heights
2015	Brecksville-Broadview Heights
2014	Brecksville-Broadview Heights
2013	Brecksville-Broadview Heights
2012	Brecksville-Broadview Heights
2011	Brecksville-Broadview Heights
2010	Brecksville-Broadview Heights
2009	Brecksville-Broadview Heights
2008	Brecksville-Broadview Heights
2007	Brecksville-Broadview Heights
2006	Brecksville-Broadview Heights
2005	Brecksville-Broadview Heights
2004	Brecksville-Broadview Heights
2003	Rocky River Magnificat
2002	Rocky River Magnificat
2001	Brecksville-Broadview Heights
2000	Brecksville-Broadview Heights
1999	Rocky River Magnificat
1998	Rocky River Magnificat
1997	Rocky River Magnificat
1996	Rocky River Magnificat
1995	Upper Arlington
1994	Brecksville-Broadview Heights
1993	Rocky River Magnificat
1992	Rocky River Magnificat
1991	Rocky River Magnificat
1990	Rocky River Magnificat
1989	Thomas Worthington
1988	Thomas Worthington
1987	Thomas Worthington
1986	Thomas Worthington
1985	Thomas Worthington
1984	Dublin
1983	Berea
1982	Dublin
1981	Kettering Fairmont West
1980	Dublin
1979	Lakewood
1978	Bay Village Bay
1977	Centerville

== Boys' gymnastics champions ==
Boys' gymnastics were discontinued by the OHSAA after the 1993 season

Year	Boys champions
1993	Columbus St. Francis DeSales
1992	Columbus St. Francis DeSales
1991	Columbus St. Francis DeSales
1990	Columbus St. Francis DeSales
1989	Franklin
1988	Franklin
1987	Thomas Worthington
1986	Franklin
1985	Franklin
1984	Miamisburg
1983	Miamisburg
1982	Franklin
1981	Miamisburg
1980	Centerville
1979	Franklin
1978	Franklin
1977	Franklin
1976	Huber Heights Wayne
1975	Huber Heights Wayne
1974	Franklin
1973	Huber Heights Wayne
1972	Miamisburg
1971	Kettering Fairmont East
1970	Miamisburg
1969	Kettering Fairmont East
1968	Kettering Fairmont East
1967	Dayton Belmont
1966	Cuyahoga Falls
1965	Kettering Fairmont East
1938-1964	no team championships
1937	Cleveland East Tech
1936	Cleveland East Tech
1935	Cleveland East Tech
1934	Cleveland East Tech
1933	Cleveland East Tech
1932	Columbus North
1931	Columbus East
1930	Columbus Central
1929	Columbus Central
1928	Columbus East
1927	Columbus North
1926	Columbus North

== See also ==
- List of Ohio High School Athletic Association championships
- List of high schools in Ohio
- Ohio High School Athletic Conferences
- Ohio High School Athletic Association
