= List of OHSAA lacrosse champions =

OHSAA) is the governing body of athletic programs

The Ohio High School Athletic Association (OHSAA) is the governing body of athletic programs for junior, and senior high schools in the state of Ohio. It conducts state championship competitions in all the OHSAA-sanctioned sports.

== Champions ==
Year	Boys D I	Boys D II	Girls D I	Girls D II
2017	Cincinnati Moeller	Cincinnati Mariemont	Upper Arlington	Cincinnati Indian Hill
2018	Cincinnati St. Xavier	Columbus St. Francis DeSales	Upper Arlington	Cincinnati Mariemont
2019	Dublin Coffman	Chagrin Falls	Upper Arlington	Columbus St. Francis DeSales
2020	Tournament canceled	Tournament canceled	Tournament canceled	Tournament canceled
2021	Dublin Jerome	Cincinnati Mariemont	Dublin Coffman	Cincinnati Mariemont
2022	Upper Arlington	Columbus St. Francis DeSales	New Albany	Cincinnati Mariemont
2023	Dublin Jerome	Olmsted Falls	Upper Arlington	Columbus Bishop Watterson
2024	Olentangy Liberty	Columbus St. Francis DeSales	Olentangy Liberty	Columbus St. Francis DeSales
2025	Cincinnati St. Xavier	Bishop Watterson	Olentangy Liberty	Columbus St. Francis DeSales
2026	Cincinnati St. Xavier	Rocky River	Olentangy Liberty	Columbus St. Francis DeSales

== See also ==
- List of Ohio High School Athletic Association championships
- List of high schools in Ohio
- Ohio High School Athletic Conferences
- Ohio High School Athletic Association
