= List of OHSAA bowling champions =

The Ohio High School Athletic Association (OHSAA) is the governing body of athletic programs for junior and senior high schools in the state of Ohio. It conducts state championship competitions in all the OHSAA-sanctioned sports.

== Boys' bowling champions ==
Year	Boys D I	Boys D II
2026	Cincinnati St. Xavier	St. Henry
2025	Ashland	Benjamin Logan
2024	Beavercreek	Marion Pleasant
2023	Beavercreek	De Graff Riverside
2022	Centerville	Mechanicsburg
2021	Kettering Fairmont	Mechanicsburg
2020	Sidney	Coldwater
2019	Vandalia Butler	St. Marys Memorial
2018	Celina	Mechanicsburg
2017	Westerville Central	St. Marys Memorial
2016	Huber Heights Wayne	Urbana
2015	Beavercreek	Coldwater
2014	Wapakoneta	Champion
2013	Canfield	
2012	Coldwater	
2011	Troy	
2010	Springfield Kenton Ridge	
2009	Springfield Kenton Ridge	
2008	Riverside Stebbins	
2007	Coldwater	

== Girls' bowling champions ==
Year	Girls D I	Girls D II
2026	Celina	Napoleon
2025	Butler	Urbana
2024	Boardman	Springfield Kenton Ridge
2023	Macedonia Nordonia	Bowerston Conotton Valley
2022	Hamilton	Wooster Triway
2021	Gahanna Lincoln	Coldwater
2020	Gahanna Lincoln	Bryan
2019	Centerville	St. Marys Memorial
2018	Gahanna Lincoln	Fairport Harbor Fairport Harding
2017	Stow-Munroe Falls	Coldwater
2016	Troy	Mechanicsburg
2015	Wapakoneta	Coldwater
2014	Beavercreek	Mechanicsburg
2013	Coldwater	
2012	Coldwater	
2011	St. Marys Memorial	
2010	Boardman	
2009	Pemberville Eastwood	
2008	Centerville	
2007	Beavercreek	

== See also ==
- List of Ohio High School Athletic Association championships
- List of high schools in Ohio
- Ohio High School Athletic Conferences
- Ohio High School Athletic Association
