= Ohio High School Athletic Association =

Governing body of athletic programs

- Abbreviation: OHSAA
- Formation: 1907
- Legal status: Association
- Purpose: Athletic/Educational
- Headquarters: 4080 Roselea Pl. Columbus, Ohio U.S.
- Region served: Ohio
- Executive Director: Doug Ute
- Affiliations: National Federation of State High School Associations
- Staff: 22
- Website: ohsaa.org
- Remarks: (614) 267-2502

The Ohio High School Athletic Association (OHSAA) is the governing body of athletic programs for junior and senior high schools in the U.S. state of Ohio. The OHSAA governs eligibility of student athletes, resolves disputes, organizes levels of competition by divisional separation of schools according to attendance population, and conducts state championship competitions in all the OHSAA-sanctioned sports.

== Membership ==
There are approximately 820 member high schools and 850 more schools in the 7th-8th grade division of the OHSAA. Most public and private high schools in Ohio belong to the OHSAA.

== Structure ==
=== Districts ===
The Association is divided into six districts, each with its own District Athletic Board, including the Central District, East District, Northeast District, Northwest District, Southeast District, and Southwest District.

The District boards conduct Sectional and District tournaments. The main OHSAA board conducts Regional and State tournaments.

=== Classifications and divisions ===
Member high schools are divided into three classifications (A, AA, AAA). Prior to 1989 many sports held tournaments based on these classifications. Since then, each sport individually divides into numbered divisions based on enrollment, taking into account the total number of schools offering that varsity sport and placing an equal number of schools in each division.

The classifications (A being the smallest schools, AAA the largest) are still used to fill spots on the six District Athletic Boards (two representatives from each class).

The number of divisions varies based on how many schools offer that sport. Football has the most, with seven divisions (Division I being the largest schools). Three sports have a single division: Boys' Ice Hockey, Girls' Field Hockey, and Gymnastics. Beginning with the 2024-25 School year Baseball, boys and girls basketball, softball and girls volleyball will grow from four to seven postseason divisions and boys and girls soccer will go from three to five.

== History ==
OHSAA's 100th Anniversary logo.

The OHSAA is an unincorporated, non-profit organization founded in 1907. Members of the Western Ohio Superintendents' Round Table had frequently discussed the need of a central organization for high school athletics. In 1906 they passed a resolution to appoint a committee, headed by George R. Eastman, the first President of the Board of Control.

The first OHSAA-sponsored state tournament, Track and Field, was held on May 23, 1908, at Denison University. Columbus North became the first state champions, finishing ahead of Dayton Steele.

The OHSAA is currently headed by a commissioner. Prior to 1925, the Board of Control officers handled duties now associated with the Commissioner.

In 1979, OHSAA adopted a bylaw prohibiting out-of-state students from competing in OHSAA-sponsored activities. This rule was affirmed by the Sixth Circuit Court of Appeals in the 1985 case Alerding v. Ohio High School Athletic Association, regarding St. Xavier High School students from Northern Kentucky.

=== Commissioners since 1925 ===
- H.R. Townsend (1925–1944)
- Harold Emswiler (1944–1958)
- W.J. McConnell (1958–1963)
- Paul E. Landis (1963–1969)
- Harold A. Meyer (1969–1977)
- George D. Bates (1977–1980)
- Richard L. Armstrong (1980–1989)
- Clair Muscaro (1990–2004)
- Daniel B. Ross, Ph.D. (2004–2018)
- Jerry Snodgrass (2018–2020)
- Doug Ute (2020–present)

== OHSAA–sponsored sports tournaments ==
=== Boys ===
Season	Sport	Tournament Structure	# of Divisions	1st Tournament	2025-26 State Tournament Location
Fall	Cross country	District, Regional, & State	3	1928	Fortress Obetz, Obetz; Memorial Park, Obetz
Fall	Football	Regional & State	7	1972	Tom Benson Hall of Fame Stadium, Canton
Fall	Golf	Sectional, District & State	3	1927 (Spring sport 1927–1974)	Firestone Country Club, Akron (Div I); NCR Country Club, Dayton (Div II); North Star Golf Resort, Sunbury (Div III)
Fall	Soccer	Sectional, District, Regional & State	5	1976	Historic Crew Stadium, Columbus
Winter	Basketball	Sectional, District, Regional, & State	7	1923	UD Arena, University of Dayton, Dayton
Winter	Bowling	Sectional, District, & State	2	2007	HP Lanes, Columbus
Winter	Ice hockey	District & State	1	1978	Nationwide Arena, Columbus
Winter	Swimming and diving	Sectional, District, & State	2	1928	C. T. Branin Natatorium, Canton
Winter	Wrestling	Sectional, District, & State	3	1938	Value City Arena at the Jerome Schottenstein Center, Ohio State University, Columbus
Spring	Baseball	Sectional, District, Regional, & State	7	1928	7 17 Credit Union Park, Akron
Spring	Track and field	District, Regional, & State	3	1908	Jesse Owens Memorial Stadium, Ohio State University, Columbus
Spring	Tennis	Sectional, District, & State	2**	1922	Lindner Family Tennis Center, Mason
Spring	Lacrosse	State	2	2017	Historic Crew Stadium, Columbus
Spring	Volleyball	State	2	2023	Wittenberg University, Springfield

=== Girls ===
Season	Sport	Tournament Structure	# of Divisions	1st Tournament	2025-26 State Tournament Location
Fall	Cross country	District, Regional, & State	3	1978	Fortress Obetz, Obetz; Memorial Park, Obetz
Fall	Field hockey	State Qualifying & State	1	1979	Thomas Worthington High School, Worthington
Fall	Golf	Sectional, District & State	2	1993	NCR Country Club, Firestone Country Club, Akron (Div I); Heatherwoode Golf Club, Springboro (Div II)
Fall	Soccer	Sectional, District, Regional & State	5	1985	Historic Crew Stadium, Columbus
Fall	Tennis	Sectional, District, & State	2**	1976	Lindner Family Tennis Center, Mason
Fall	Volleyball	Sectional, District, Regional, & State	7	1975	Nutter Center, Wright State University, Dayton
Winter	Basketball	Sectional, District, Regional, & State	7	1976	UD Arena, University of Dayton, Dayton
Winter	Bowling	Sectional, District, & State	2	2007	HP Lanes, Columbus
Winter	Gymnastics	Sectional, District, & State	1	1977	Hilliard Bradley High School, Hilliard
Winter	Swimming and diving	Sectional, District, & State	2	1977	C.T. Branin Natatorium, Canton
Winter	Wrestling	Sectional, District, & State	3	2023	Value City Arena at the Jerome Schottenstein Center, Ohio State University, Columbus
Spring	Girl's flag football	Regional & State	-	2026	Tom Benson Hall of Fame Stadium, Canton
Spring	Softball	Sectional, District, Regional, & State	7	1978	Firestone Stadium, Akron
Spring	Track and field	District, Regional, & State	3	1975	Jesse Owens Memorial Stadium, Ohio State University, Columbus
Spring	Lacrosse	State	2	2017	Historic Crew Stadium, Columbus

**(Individual/Doubles only, no team championships)

==== Formerly sanctioned OHSAA sports ====
Boys

Season	Sport	Tournament Structure	# of Divisions	1st Tournament
Winter	Wrestling-dual meet	Regional & State	3	2013–2020 (discontinued)
Winter	Gymnastics	Sectional, District, & State	1	1926–1937; 1965–1993 (discontinued)

=== Past team state champions ===
==== Schools with most team titles ====
* X = single-gender school

Rank	# of titles	School	City	# of boys' titles	# of girls' titles	Year of first title	Year of last title	Totals by sport
1t	68	St. Edward	Lakewood	68	X*	1978	2025	Boys: 38 wrestling, 11 hockey, 7 football, 5 dual meet wrestling, 3 baseball, 2 track, 2 basketball
1t	68	St. Xavier	Cincinnati	68	X*	1957	2026	Boys: 44 swimming, 6 cross country, 5 golf, 4 football, 3 lacrosse, 2 baseball, 1 basketball, 1 bowling, 1 soccer, 1 volleyball
3	57	Upper Arlington	Upper Arlington	28	29	1937	2026	Boys: 17 golf, 3 swimming, 2 baseball, 2 track, 1 football, 1 basketball, 1 ice hockey, 1 lacrosse Girls: 15 swimming, 6 cross country, 4 lacrosse, 1 basketball, 1 gymnastics, 1 soccer, 1 track
4	49	St. Ignatius	Cleveland	49	X*	1988	2025	Boys: 14 soccer, 11 football, 8 ice hockey, 4 cross country, 4 golf, 2 track, 2 baseball, 2 basketball, 1 wrestling, 1 volleyball
5	43	Minster	Minster	9	34	1976	2024	Boys: 4 baseball, 3 football, 1 golf, 1 track Girls: 13 track, 17 cross country, 4 basketball
6	42	Hawken	Gates Mills	7	35	1977	2022	Boys: 4 swimming, 2 golf, 1 soccer Girls: 32 swimming, 2 track, 1 golf
7	40	Walsh Jesuit	Cuyahoga Falls	22	18	1982	2023	Boys: 8 wrestling, 4 golf, 4 baseball, 3 soccer, 2 cross country, 1 football Girls: 11 soccer, 3 golf, 3 softball, 1 basketball
8t	36	Graham	St. Paris	35	0	1930	2026	Boys: 27 wrestling, 7 dual meet wrestling, 2 baseball
8t	36	Columbus Academy	Gahanna	20	16	1977	2025	Boys: 12 golf, 4 track, 2 football, 1 baseball, 1 soccer Girls: 12 field hockey, 4 golf
10	35	St. Francis DeSales	Columbus	25	10	1971	2026	Boys: 7 soccer, 4 gymnastics, 3 wrestling, 3 football, 3 baseball, 3 lacrosse, 1 basketball, 1 volleyball Girls: 4 lacrosse, 4 soccer, 2 volleyball
11t	34	St.Vincent-St.Mary	Akron	23	11	1972	2022	Boys: 11 basketball, 6 football, 2 baseball, 2 track, 1 wrestling, 1 golf Girls: 5 cross country, 3 basketball, 2 softball, 1 track
11t	34	Thomas Worthington	Worthington	12	22	1938	2025	Boys: 3 golf, 3 soccer, 3 track, 1 baseball, 1 cross country, 1 gymnastics Girls: 10 field hockey, 5 gymnastics, 5 swimming, 2 cross country
13	33	Brecksville-Broadview Heights	Broadview Heights	5	28	1981	2026	Boys: 3 soccer, 1 football, 1 dual meet wrestling Girls: 26 gymnastics, 1 cross country, 1 volleyball
14t	31	Archbishop Alter	Kettering	20	11	1978	2025	Boys: 8 golf, 5 soccer, 4 basketball, 2 football, 1 cross country Girls: 5 basketball, 3 volleyball, 2 soccer, 1 cross country
14t	31	Coldwater	Coldwater	19	12	1983	2025	Boys: 7 baseball, 8 football, 4 bowling Girls: 5 bowling, 4 track, 2 basketball, 1 volleyball
16	28	Newark Catholic	Newark	17	11	1978	2025	Boys: 8 football, 9 baseball Girls: 9 volleyball, 1 basketball, 1 track
17t	27	Canton McKinley	Canton	23	4	1937	2010	Boys: 13 swimming, 3 football, 3 basketball, 2 baseball, 1 golf, 1 track Girls: 3 volleyball, 1 basketball
17t	27	Archbishop Moeller	Cincinnati	27	X*	1972	2026	Boys: 9 football, 9 baseball, 5 basketball, 2 volleyball, 1 golf, 1 lacrosse
19	26	Marion Local	Maria Stein	20	6	1975	2024	Boys: 15 football, 3 basketball, 2 track Girls: 5 volleyball, 1 basketball
20t	25	Bishop Watterson	Columbus	17	8	1972	2026	Boys: 5 golf, 3 baseball, 3 football, 2 basketball, 2 wrestling, 1 soccer, 1 lacrosse Girls: 5 field hockey, 1 lacrosse, 1 soccer, 1 cross country
20t	25	Archbishop Hoban	Akron	12	13	1980	2026	Boys: 5 football, 2 track, 2 golf, 2 basketball, 1 baseball Girls: 6 softball, 4 volleyball, 2 basketball, 1 soccer
22t	24	Beaumont School	Cleveland Heights	X	24	1986	2012	Girls: 16 track, 7 cross country, 1 volleyball
22t	24	East Technical	Cleveland	23	1	1920	2002	Boys: 13 track, 5 gymnastics3 basketball, 2 swimming Girls: 1 basketball
24	23	St. Henry	St. Henry	15	8	1979	2026	Boys: 7 football, 4 basketball, 3 baseball, 1 bowling Girls: 7 volleyball, 1 basketball
25t	22	Dublin Jerome	Dublin	13	9	2004	2025	Boys: 10 golf, 2 lacrosse, 1 soccer Girls: 8 golf, 1 swimming
25t	22	Elder	Cincinnati	22	X*	1943	2005	Boys: 12 baseball, 5 cross country, 3 basketball, 2 football
25t	22	Glenville	Cleveland	22	0	1959	2025	Boys: 19 track, 3 football
28	21	Mount Notre Dame	Cincinnati	X*	21	1995	2021	Girls: 10 volleyball, 8 basketball, 2 golf, 1 soccer
29	20	St. Ursula Academy	Cincinnati	X*	20	1991	2024	Girls: 9 volleyball, 4 soccer, 3 swimming, 2 golf, 1 cross country, 1 field hockey
30	19	Gilmour Academy	Gates Mills	8	11	1971	2026	Boys: 5 golf, 2 ice hockey, 1 track Girls: 4 track, 4 volleyball, 1 cross country, 1 soccer, 1 basketball
31t	18	Summit Country Day	Cincinnati	12	6	1995	2025	Boys: 9 soccer, 1 baseball, 1 basketball, 1 cross country Girls: 6 soccer
31t	18	Versailles	Versailles	8	10	1965	2021	Boys: 7 football, 1 baseball Girls: 3 track, 3 volleyball, 2 cross country, 2 basketball
31t	18	Centerville	Centerville	6	12	1928	2022	Boys: 1 basketball, 1 baseball, 1 gymnastics, 1 hockey, 1 soccer, 1 bowling Girls: 5 cross country, 2 bowling, 2 golf, 1 gymnastics, 1 swimming, 1 track
31t	18	Magnificat	Rocky River	X*	18	1990	2024	Girls: 10 gymnastics, 4 cross country, 2 track, 1 volleyball, 1 golf
31t	18	Beavercreek	Beavercreek	9	9	1941	2025	Boys: 3 baseball, 3 bowling, 1 soccer, 1 swimming, 1 cross country Girls: 3 basketball, 3 cross country, 2 bowling, 1 soccer
31t	18	University School	Hunting Valley	18	X*	1990	2026	Boys: 11 swimming, 5 golf, 2 hockey
37t	17	Bishop Hartley	Columbus	8	9	1976	2016	Boys: 4 football, 3 track, 1 baseball Girls: 5 track, 3 basketball, 1 volleyball
37t	17	Pickerington Central	Pickerington	8	9	1985	2025	Boys: 2 football, 3 track, 1 cross country, 2 basketball Girls: 8 basketball, 1 softball
37t	17	Mason	Mason	7	10	2000	2024	Boys: 5 cross country, 1 soccer, 1 baseball Girls: 3 golf, 3 cross country, 2 swimming, 1 basketball, 1 track
40t	16	Villa-Angela/St. Joseph	Cleveland	13	3	1965	2017	Boys: 7 basketball, 4 cross country, 1 football, 1 wrestling Girls: 2 volleyball, 1 basketball
40t	16	Dunbar	Dayton	15	1	1948	2017	Boys: 10 track, 5 basketball Girls: 1 basketball
40t	16	Cincinnati Ursuline Academy	Cincinnati	X*	16	1975	2022	Girls: 8 volleyball, 7 swimming, 1 golf
40t	16	Woodridge	Cuyahoga Falls	12	4	1995	2024	Boys: 11 cross country, 1 track Girls: 2 cross country, 2 track
40t	16	Hiland	Berlin	10	6	1992	2026	Boys: 4 baseball, 4 basketball, 2 golf Girls: 6 basketball
45t	15	Cleveland Heights	Cleveland Heights	11	4	1932	2008	Boys: 4 swimming, 3 track, 1 baseball, 1 basketball, 1 ice hockey, 1 wrestling Girls: 4 track
45t	15	Jefferson Township	Dayton	12	3	1957	2010	Boys: 9 track, 3 basketball Girls: 3 track
45t	15	Dublin Coffman	Dublin	7	8	1977	2021	Boys: 4 golf, 1 baseball, 1 cross country, 1 lacrosse Girls: 3 gymnastics, 2 soccer, 1 golf, 1 swimming, 1 lacrosse
45t	15	Fort Loramie	Fort Loramie	8	7	1977	2024	Boys: 3 basketball, 3 baseball, 2 cross country Girls: 4 basketball, 2 volleyball, 1 cross country

==== Schools with most team titles in one sport ====
Rank	# of titles	School	City	Sport	First	Last
1	44	St. Xavier	Cincinnati	Boys' swimming	1970	2024
2	38	St. Edward	Lakewood	Wrestling	1978	2025
3	32	Hawken	Gates Mills	Girls' swimming	1984	2022
4	27	Graham	St. Paris	Wrestling	1982	2026
5	26	Brecksville-Broadview Heights	Broadview Heights	Girls' gymnastics	1994	2026
6	18	Glenville	Cleveland	Boys' track	1959	2023
7t	17	Upper Arlington	Upper Arlington	Boys' golf	1941	2006
7t	17	Minster	Minster	Girls' cross country	1982	2025
9	16	Beaumont School	Cleveland Heights	Girls' track	1986	2008
10	15	Marion Local	Maria Stein	Football	2000	2024
11t	14	St. Ignatius	Cleveland	Soccer	2004	2024
11t	14	Upper Arlington	Upper Arlington	Girls' swimming	2003	2025
13t	13	Canton McKinley	Canton	Boys' swimming	1937	1961
13t	13	East Technical	Cleveland	Boys' track	1920	1955
13t	13	Minster	Minster	Girls' track	1976	2018
16t	12	Columbus Academy	Gahanna	Field hockey	1994	2019
16t	12	Columbus Academy	Gahanna	Boys' golf	1983	2021
16t	12	Elder	Cincinnati	Baseball	1943	2005
19t	11	St. Edward	Lakewood	Ice hockey	1985	2008
19t	11	St. Ignatius	Cleveland	Football	1988	2011
19t	11	Walsh Jesuit	Cuyahoga Falls	Girls' soccer	2000	2023
19t	11	Woodridge	Peninsula	Boys' cross country	2006	2025
19t	11	University School	Hunting Valley	Boys' swimming	2009	2026
23t	10	Strasburg-Franklin	Strasburg	Girls' softball	1987	2024
23t	10	Maple Heights	Maple Heights	Wrestling	1956	1974
23t	10	Magnificat	Rocky River	Girls' gymnastics	1990	2003
23t	10	Dunbar	Dayton	Boys' track	1948	2017
23t	10	Mount Notre Dame	Cincinnati	Girls' volleyball	1995	2020
23t	10	St. Vincent–St. Mary	Akron	Boys' basketball	1984	2022
23t	10	Dublin Jerome	Dublin	Boys' golf	2004	2025
23t	10	Thomas Worthington	Worthington	Girls' field hockey	1988	2025

==== Schools with 5+ consecutive team titles in each sport ====
Season	Sport	School	# of consecutive state titles	Years
Winter	Girls' Swimming and diving	Gates Mills Hawken	24	1999–2022
Winter	Girls' gymnastics	Brecksville-Broadview Heights	23	2004–2026*
Winter	Wrestling-individual	St. Paris Graham	18	2001–2019
Winter	Boys' Swimming and diving	Cincinnati St. Xavier	13	2009–2021
Fall	Boys' Cross country	Caldwell	8	1985–1992
Winter	Wrestling-dual team	St. Paris Graham	7	2013–2019
Spring	Girls' Track and Field	Cleveland Heights Beaumont	7	1986–1992
Fall	Boys' Soccer	Cleveland St. Ignatius	6	2019–2024
Fall	Volleyball	Cincinnati St Ursula Academy	6	1993–1998
Spring	Boys' track and field	Cleveland East Tech	6	1939–1944
Winter	Wrestling-individual	St. Paris Graham	5	2021–2026
Fall	Girls' Cross country	Akron St. Vincent-St. Mary	5	2009–2013
Fall	Football	Cleveland St. Ignatius	5	1991–1995
Fall	Boys' Golf	Gahanna Columbus Academy	5	2017–2021
Fall	Girls' Golf	Dublin Jerome	5	2011–2015
Fall	Girls' Soccer	Cuyahoga Falls Walsh Jesuit	5	2012–2016
Winter	Girls' Basketball	Shaker Heights Hathaway Brown	5	2009–2013
Winter	Boys' Gymnastics	Cleveland East Tech	5	1933–1937

* active streak

== See also ==
- List of high schools in Ohio
- Ohio high school athletic conferences
- Mr. Football Award (Ohio)
- Ohio Christian School Athletic Association
- List of Ohio High School Athletic Association championships
