= Beavercreek City School District =

School district in Ohio, United States

Address
- 4029 Executive Drive Beavercreek, Ohio, 45430; United States

District information
- Type: Public
- Grades: PK–12
- Superintendent: Paul Otten
- Schools: 11
- NCES District ID: 3904724

Students and staff
- Students: 8,099 (2025–2026)
- Teachers: 423.89 (on an FTE basis) (2025–2026)
- Staff: 547.22 (on an FTE basis) (2025–2026)
- Student–teacher ratio: 19.11 (2025–2026)

Other information
- Website: www.beavercreek.k12.oh.us

Beavercreek City School District is located in Beavercreek, Ohio, southeast of Dayton. The district contains 1 high school, 2 middle schools, 1 preschool, and 6 elementary schools. The school district, in 2013, had over 7,500 students.

== Governance ==
Beavercreek City School District elects five Board of Education members that appoint a superintendent to carry out day-to-day operations within the school district. As of 2026, the current Board of Education members are Jo Ann Rigano (President), Krista Hunt (Vice-President), Gene Taylor, Nathan Boone, and Denny Morrison. The current superintendent is Paul Otten.

== Schools ==
Beavercreek City School District operates ten schools and one separate facility for freshmen. They operate one preschool, six elementary schools, two middle schools, and one high school.

=== Preschools ===
- Beavercreek Preschool Center

=== Elementary schools ===
- Fairbrook Elementary School
- Main Elementary School
- Parkwood Elementary School
- Shaw Elementary School
- Trebein Elementary School (located in the same facility as Coy Middle School)
- Valley Elementary School

=== Middle schools ===
- Ankeney Middle School
- Coy Middle School

=== High schools ===
- Beavercreek High School
- Ferguson Hall (a separate facility located on the high school campus that houses the freshmen)

=== Former school names ===
- Ferguson Middle School – renamed Ferguson Hall in 2013 when it became a part of the high school campus
- Ferguson Junior High School – renamed Ferguson Middle School in 1999
- Ankeney Junior High School – renamed Ankeney Middle School in 1999
