= List of OHSAA flag football champions =

OHSAA Sponsored Sport

The Ohio High School Athletic Association (OHSAA) is the governing body of athletic programs for junior and senior high schools in the state of Ohio. It conducts state championship competitions in all the OHSAA-sanctioned sports.

== Girls' flag football champions ==
Year	Champion
2026	Macedonia Nordonia

=== Non-OHSAA sanctioned girls' flag football state championship ===
Girls' flag football was sponsored by the Cincinnati Bengals and Cleveland Browns during the 2025 season. The OHSAA began sanctioning the sport beginning the 2026 season.

Year	Champion
2025	Hamilton Badin
