= A. Marc Gillinov =

American cardiac surgeon

A. Marc Gillinov is an American cardiac surgeon at The Cleveland Clinic, where he is Chair of the Department of Thoracic and Cardiovascular Surgery.

He did his undergraduate work at Yale University and obtained his medical degree from The Johns Hopkins University School of Medicine, and joined the Cleveland Clinic staff in 1997.

Inventions made by Gillinov, along with those of another surgeon, Edward M. Boyle, formed the basis for a wound drainage product brought to market by ClearFlow. He worked on a device for left atrial appendage occlusion sold by AtriCure.

He wrote a book with Steven Nissen that published in 2012.
