= Hawken School =

Private school in Gates Mills, Ohio, US

Location
- 12465 County Line Road; Gates Mills, Ohio 44040; United States; 41°31′38″N 81°23′11″W

Information
- Type: Secular, Coeducational Private school
- Motto: That the better self shall prevail, and each generation introduce its successor to a higher plane of life.
- Established: 1915
- Founder: James A. Hawken
- CEEB code: 361-262
- Head of school: D. Scott Looney
- Grades: P3-12
- Enrollment: 1045 (2016-2017)
- Student to teacher ratio: 9:1
- Colors: Red and Gray
- Athletics conference: Chagrin Valley Conference
- Nickname: Hawks
- Rival: University School
- Accreditation: North Central Association of Colleges and Schools
- Newspaper: The Affirmative No
- Yearbook: The Onyx
- Tuition: $37,950 (12th grade)
- Website: www.hawken.edu

Hawken School is an independent, coeducational, college preparatory day school operating a network of campuses across Greater Cleveland, Ohio.

Hawken currently has two main campuses, the Lower and Middle Schools in Lyndhurst and the Upper School in Chester Township, plus a third, an urban campus in University Circle, The Sally & Bob Gries Center for Experiential and Service Learning, which is utilized by all grade levels. Hawken's motto is quoted from John Lancaster Spalding's Education and the Higher Life: "That the better self shall prevail, and each generation introduce its successor to a higher plane of life"; although a sign with the secondary motto, "Fair Play," hangs in every classroom on either campus. A new middle school complex at the Lyndhurst campus was built for the 2006–07 school year. Construction on the Gates Mills campus finished in 2016, marking the opening of Stirn Hall. D. Scott Looney is the current Head of School, having assumed the position on July 1, 2006.

== History ==
The school's founder and namesake, James A. Hawken, opened his school for boys in Cleveland's Hough neighborhood in 1915. First housed at 1572 Ansel Road, the school later moved to 1588 Ansel Road, shortly before relocating to its current Lyndhurst campus in 1922. Because James Hawken believed in one-on-one education for the boys at his school, the original building on the Lyndhurst campus, now containing part of the middle school, has many rooms designed to seat between eight and ten boys. Later, in 1961, the school added a 325-acre high school campus in Chester Township, housing formerly grades 10 through 12, and now also grade 9. The school became coed in 1975.

In the fall of 2006, Lincoln Hall was added on to the Middle School, adding much-needed classroom space. In the fall of 2009, Hawken commenced a tablet computer program for grade 6 which later spread throughout the middle and high schools. The Sally & Bob Gries Center for Experiential and Service Learning (also called The Gries Center), located in University Circle, opened on August 29, 2010. In the summer of 2011, the preschool underwent a renovation.

Additionally, due to increased enrollment, the school has renovated the lower school building, adding 5,540 square feet of space into the 2nd and 3rd grade area, as well renovating 8,125 square feet of space. Changes included the addition of a new classroom to the kindergarten and 1st grades; renovations to the performing arts classrooms as well as the addition of a fourth classroom; relocation and remodeling of a science classroom; and restoration of the main lobby and exterior remodeling. The new Hurwitz Hall's construction finished in August 2013. In late 2013, Hawken announced plans for a $24.5m renovation of the Gates Mills campus, Stirn Hall. Designed by architectural firm Westlake, Reed, Leskosky, the project would bring the academic complex to 106,000 square feet. This project finished in the fall of 2016, with the grand opening on August 20–21.

Hawken has long-standing rivalries with the three other founding members of the Cleveland Council of Independent Schools: Laurel School, Hathaway Brown School, and University School. Hawken serves as the only co-educational school from the founding members.

In November 2026, an Upper School health teacher and varsity volleyball coach resigned following allegations of inappropriate conduct reported by a former student. Head of School D. Scott Looney stated the school was cooperating with law enforcement and that the allegations did not involve current students.

== Athletics ==
=== Ohio High School Athletic Association State Championships ===
- Girls Golf – 2013
- Girls Track – 1999, 2000
- Girls Swimming – 1984–88, 1990, 1996, 1997, 1999–2022
- Boys Swimming – 1988, 1989, 2017, 2021
- Boys Golf – 1977, 1978
- Boys Soccer – 2000

== Accreditation and membership ==
- Accredited, Independent Schools Association of the Central States
- Accredited, Ohio State Board of Education
- Member, National Association for College Admission Counseling
- Member, National Association of Independent Schools
- Member, Ohio Association for College Admission Counseling
- Member, College Board

== Notable alumni ==
- Sonia Aggarwal, 2002, policy advisor
- William Bayer, 1953, Edgar Award-winning crime fiction writer
- Charles B. Bolton, 1927, dentist
- G. Armour Craig, American academic and president of Amherst College
- William Daroff, 1986, chief executive officer of the Conference of Presidents of Major American Jewish Organizations
- Steven M. Dettelbach, 1984, United States Attorney for the Northern District of Ohio
- Kenyon Farrow, 1993, award-winning writer, journalist, and social justice activist
- Alexis Floyd, actress, best known for role of Neff in Inventing Anna, Netflix series
- A. Marc Gillinov, 1980, heart surgeon at Cleveland Clinic, Judith Dion Pyle Chair in Heart Valve Research at Cleveland Clinic
- Richard J. Green, 1983, American chemist known for his work against Holocaust denial
- Peter Harrold, 2002, professional ice hockey player in the National Hockey League
- Scott Healy, 1978, keyboardist for The Max Weinberg 7
- Roberta A. Kaplan, 1984, lawyer
- Arthur Laffer, 1955, economist
- Todd Lieberman, 1991, award-winning producer
- Jim Margolis, 1989, Emmy Award-winning producer
- O.J. McDuffie, 1988, professional football player in the National Football League
- Mark Moyar, 1989, military historian, professor, former USAID official, author of (inter alia) Triumph Forsaken: The Vietnam War, 1954–1965 (2006)
- Alan B. McElroy, 1978, screenwriter
- Nick Minchin, 1971, Australian Senator and Minister for Finance and Administration
- Molly Shannon, 1983, actress
- Justine Siegal, baseball coach.
- Melanie Valerio, 1987, 1996 Olympic gold medalist in swimming
- Nico Walker, 2003, best-selling author and bank robber
- Evan Wright, 1983, writer for Rolling Stone and Vanity Fair
