= Broadview Heights, Ohio =

- City
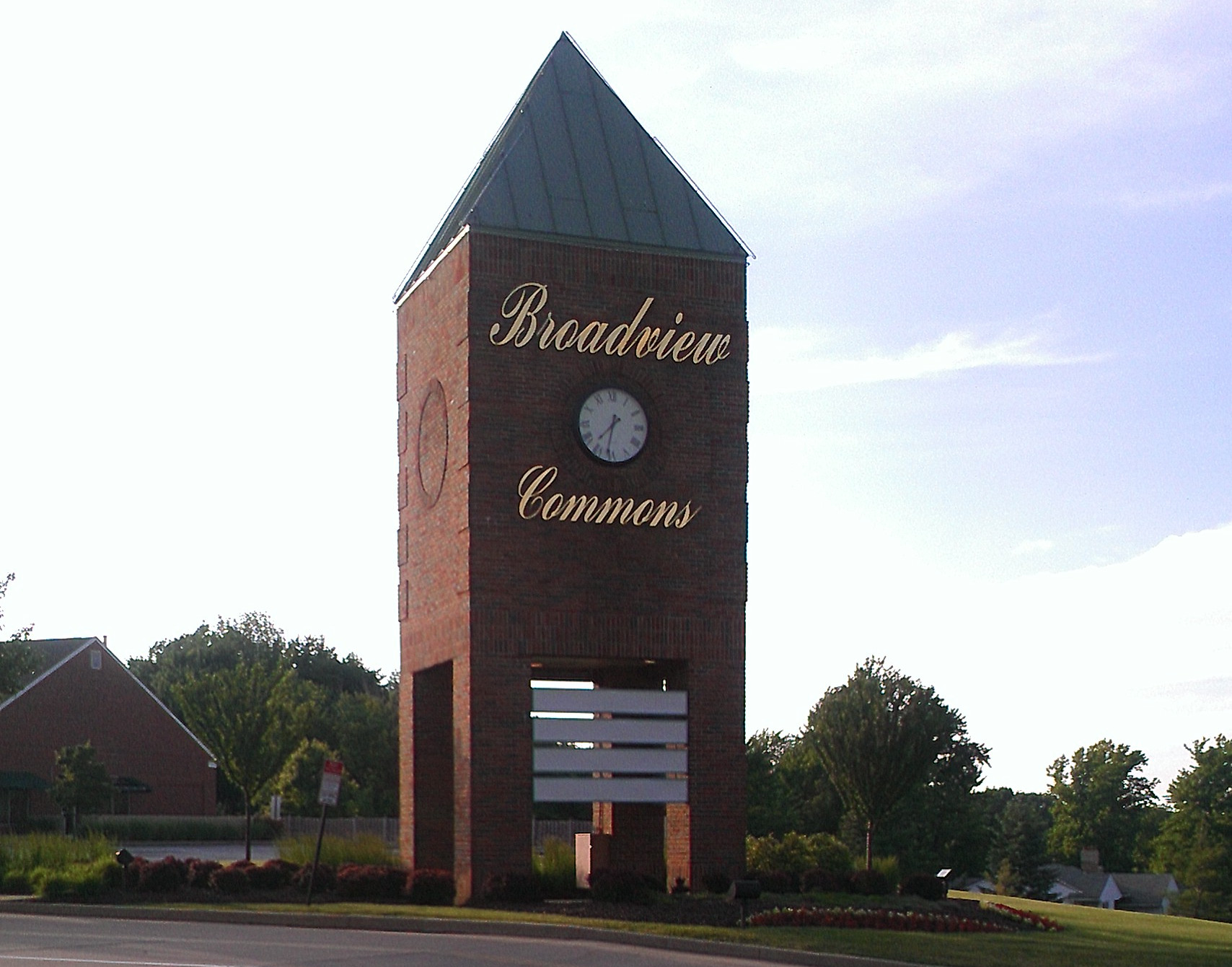
- Broadview Commons Shopping Center

- Logo
- Motto: "The Highest of the Heights"
- Interactive map of Broadview Heights, Ohio
- Location within Ohio Location within the United States
- Coordinates: 41°19′19″N 81°40′36″W
- Country: United States
- State: Ohio
- County: Cuyahoga
- Incorporated: 1926 (village); 1960 (city)

Government
  - Mayor: Samuel J. Alai (D)

Area
  - Total: 13.05 sq mi (33.81 km^{2})
  - Land: 13.03 sq mi (33.76 km^{2})
  - Water: 0.019 sq mi (0.05 km^{2})
- Elevation: 1,191 ft (363 m)

Population (2020)
  - Total: 19,936
  - Estimate (2023): 19,634
  - Density: 1,529.6/sq mi (590.58/km^{2})
- Time zone: UTC-5 (Eastern (EST))
  - Summer (DST): UTC-4 (EDT)
- ZIP code: 44147
- Area code: 440
- FIPS code: 39-09064
- GNIS feature ID: 1056723
- Website: broadview-heights.org

Broadview Heights is a city in southern Cuyahoga County, Ohio, United States. The city's population was 19,936 at the 2020 census. A suburb of Cleveland, it is part of the Cleveland metropolitan area.

== History ==
Native Americans once occupied the land that is now part of Broadview Heights. In 1811, Seth Paine, a surveyor sent by Colonel John Breck, became the first white man to settle the area. At the time, land now part of Brecksville, Broadview Heights, and North Royalton was known as Brecksville Township.

Broadview Heights was officially incorporated as a village on December 17, 1926 after a petition and an election among residents of the western portion of Brecksville Township. In 1927, Floyd C. Harris took office as the first mayor of Broadview Heights. In 1960, on the basis of census results indicating population growth, Broadview Heights became a city.

The current City Hall campus was purchased by the city in 1996 for $750,000. At the time, Broadview Developmental Center, a hospital which had closed in the 1980s, stood on the site. Following the purchase, the site became known as Broadview Center and was renovated. In 1998, Recreation and Human Services moved to the Thorin Building, and City Hall was moved onto the campus in 1999. Buildings on the campus also came to be used by the police department and other local organizations. In 2018, the city renovated and added on to the recreation center by adding new basketball courts, a new work out area, and a new pool.

== Geography ==
Broadview Heights is located at 41°19′19″N 81°40′36″W (41.321827, -81.676595). According to the United States Census Bureau, the city has a total area of 13.07 square miles (33.85 km^{2}), of which 13.05 square miles (33.80 km^{2}) is land and 0.02 square miles (0.05 km^{2}) is water.

== Demographics ==
Historical population
Census	Pop.	Note	%±
1930	689		—
1940	1,141		65.6%
1950	2,279		99.7%
1960	6,209		172.4%
1970	11,463		84.6%
1980	10,909		−4.8%
1990	12,219		12.0%
2000	15,967		30.7%
2010	19,400		21.5%
2020	19,936		2.8%
2025 (est.)	19,755		−0.9%
U.S. Decennial Census

=== Racial and ethnic composition ===
Broadview Heights city, Ohio – Racial and ethnic composition Note: the US Census treats Hispanic/Latino as an ethnic category. This table excludes Latinos from the racial categories and assigns them to a separate category. Hispanics/Latinos may be of any race.
Race / Ethnicity (NH = Non-Hispanic)	Pop 2000	Pop 2010	Pop 2020	% 2000	% 2010	% 2020
White alone (NH)	15,069	17,403	16,987	94.38%	89.71%	85.21%
Black or African American alone (NH)	126	391	522	0.79%	2.02%	2.62%
Native American or Alaska Native alone (NH)	12	22	10	0.08%	0.11%	0.05%
Asian alone (NH)	476	999	1,035	2.98%	5.15%	5.19%
Native Hawaiian or Pacific Islander alone (NH)	1	4	0	0.01%	0.02%	0.00%
Other race alone (NH)	15	6	63	0.09%	0.03%	0.32%
Mixed race or Multiracial (NH)	121	222	694	0.76%	1.14%	3.48%
Hispanic or Latino (any race)	147	353	625	0.92%	1.82%	3.14%
Total	15,967	19,400	19,936	100.00%	100.00%	100.00%

=== 2023 census update ===
The racial makeup of the city: White 87%, Black 3.2%, Asian 5.8%, Hispanic 2%, Two or more races 3.5%. Of the city's population over the age of 25, 54% hold a bachelor's degree or higher. Median household income: $97,902. The per capita income in for a family of three: $176,136.

=== 2020 census ===
As of the 2020 census, Broadview Heights had a population of 19,936. The median age was 42.6 years. 21.0% of residents were under the age of 18 and 18.8% of residents were 65 years of age or older. For every 100 females there were 94.2 males, and for every 100 females age 18 and over there were 91.3 males age 18 and over.

100.0% of residents lived in urban areas, while 0% lived in rural areas.

There were 8,145 households in Broadview Heights, of which 27.9% had children under the age of 18 living in them. Of all households, 53.8% were married-couple households, 15.4% were households with a male householder and no spouse or partner present, and 25.2% were households with a female householder and no spouse or partner present. About 28.3% of all households were made up of individuals and 11.4% had someone living alone who was 65 years of age or older.

There were 8,466 housing units, of which 3.8% were vacant. Among occupied housing units, 78.4% were owner-occupied and 21.6% were renter-occupied. The homeowner vacancy rate was 0.9% and the rental vacancy rate was 3.7%.

Racial composition as of the 2020 census
Race	Number	Percent
White	17,154	86.0%
Black or African American	546	2.7%
American Indian and Alaska Native	27	0.1%
Asian	1,041	5.2%
Native Hawaiian and Other Pacific Islander	1	<0.1%
Some other race	180	0.9%
Two or more races	987	5.0%
Hispanic or Latino (of any race)	625	3.1%

=== 2010 census ===
As of the census of 2010, there were 19,400 people, 7,698 households, and 5,255 families residing in the city. The population density was 1,486.6 inhabitants per square mile (574.0/km^{2}). There were 8,237 housing units at an average density of 631.2 per square mile (243.7/km^{2}). The racial makeup of the city was 91.0% White, 2.1% African American, 0.1% Native American, 5.2% Asian, 0.4% from other races, and 1.3% from two or more races. Hispanic or Latino of any race were 1.8% of the population.

There were 7,698 households, of which 33.3% had children under the age of 18 living with them, 56.9% were married couples living together, 8.4% had a female householder with no husband present, 2.9% had a male householder with no wife present, and 31.7% were non-families. 27.5% of all households were made up of individuals, and 9.6% had someone living alone who was 65 years of age or older. The average household size was 2.50 and the average family size was 3.09.

The median age in the city was 41.5 years. 24.6% of residents were under the age of 18; 6.4% were between the ages of 18 and 24; 24.7% were from 25 to 44; 29.6% were from 45 to 64; and 14.8% were 65 years of age or older. The gender makeup of the city was 48.1% male and 51.9% female.

== Economy ==
Major employers include:

- Ohio Caterpillar (Ohio CAT)
- Brecksville-Broadview Heights City School District
- Southwestern American Financial
- City of Broadview Heights
- Family Heritage Insurance

== Theater ==
The Broadview Heights Spotlights is a community theater program in Broadview Heights. The Spotlights perform in a theater owned by the city located on the grounds of the city hall next to the police station. The community theater offers a number of shows and classes throughout the year.

== Parks and recreation ==
The Broadview Heights Recreation Center is located at 9543 Broadview Road, which is also the same building that houses the town hall. The city renovated and added on to the former part of the old recreation center in 2018.

== Education ==
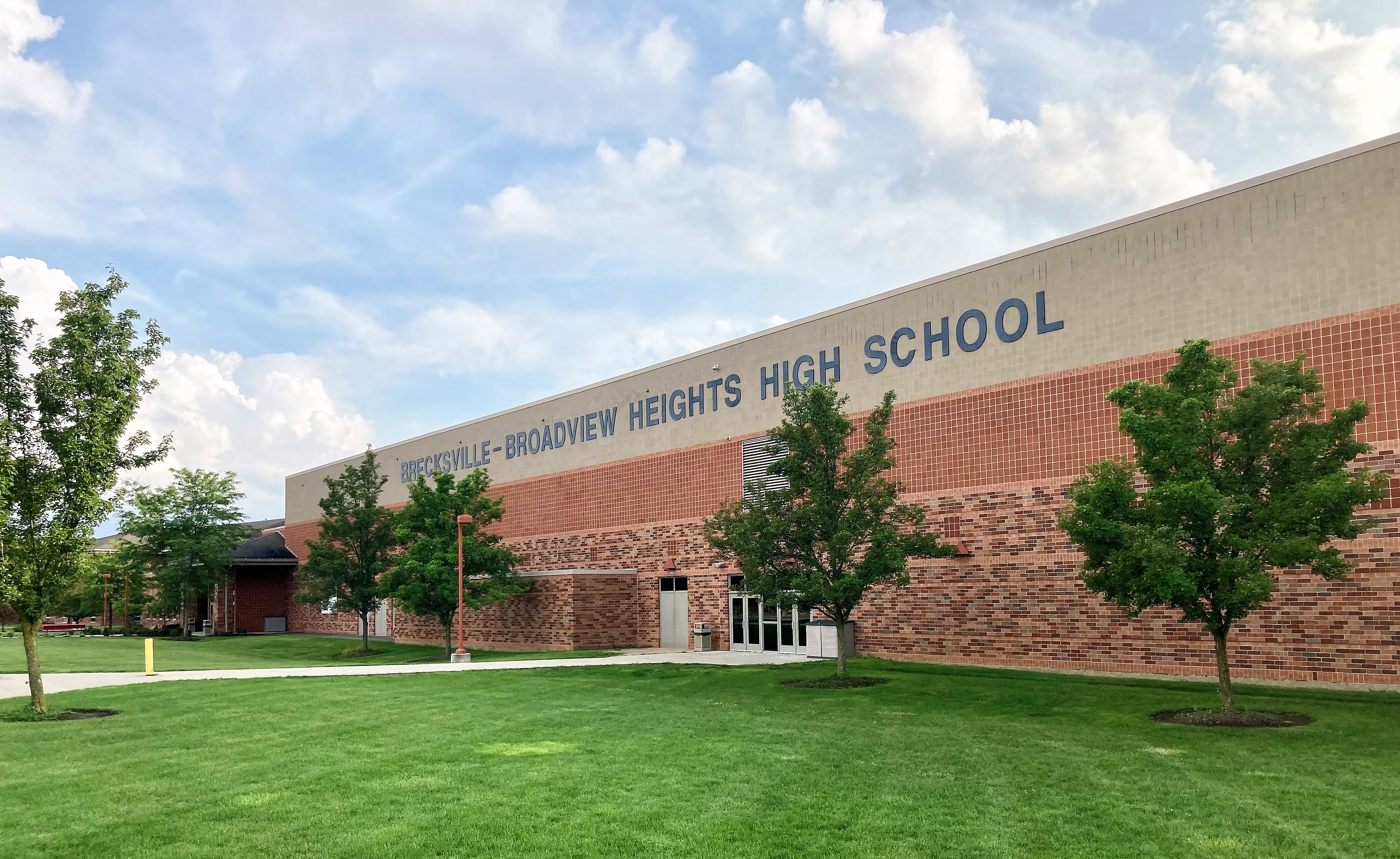
Brecksville–Broadview Heights High School

=== Public schools ===
Broadview Heights, is part of the Brecksville–Broadview Heights City School District along with neighboring Brecksville. Beginning the Fall 2022 school year, the new Brecksville-Broadview Heights Elementary School (Pre-K-5) opened on the Blossom Hill education and recreation complex in Brecksville. The Brecksville–Broadview Heights Middle School, for grades 6–8, and Brecksville–Broadview Heights High School (BBHHS), for grades 9–12, are located on a campus that spans the border between Brecksville and Broadview Heights. Approximately 4,000 students attend the district at any one time.

=== Academic ratings ===
Brecksville–Broadview Heights School District was ranked the ninth best in the state of Ohio and the third best in the Cleveland-Akron-Canton area in the 2023 state report cards.

=== Sport championships ===
- In 2023, the girls' gymnastics team won its 20th consecutive state title and 24th overall.
- The boys' wrestling team won the 2015 state championship, placed third at the state level in 2016 and second at the state level in 2023. Individual wrestlers consistently rank number one in their weight categories at the state level.
- The girls volleyball team was the state champion in the 2016–2017 school year.
- The boys football team was the state champion in 1983 and has consistently won their conference championships for many years.
- In 2024, the boys basketball team won their fourth straight Greater Cleveland Suburban League conference and will again compete in Ohio's state championship.

=== Private schools ===
The city is also the home of Assumption Academy, a Catholic elementary school, and Lawrence School, a school for children with learning differences.

== Healthcare ==
In 2016, University Hospitals opened a 52,000 new outpatient health center and freestanding emergency department in Broadview Heights accessible from Ohio 82 and the Interstate 77 interchange.

MetroHealth Brecksville Health Center, opened on the west side of the same interchange in 2016. Situated on land within both Broadview Heights and neighboring Brecksville, a joint tax sharing agreement was made between the two cities.

== Notable people ==
- David J. Bronczek - CEO and President of FedEx Express and graduate of Brecksville-Broadview Heights High School
- Arthur Chu - Jeopardy Winner
- Michael T. Good - Astronaut and graduate of Brecksville-Broadview Heights High School
- Kenny Martin - racing driver
- Julián Tavárez - MLB pitcher
