= Magnificat High School =

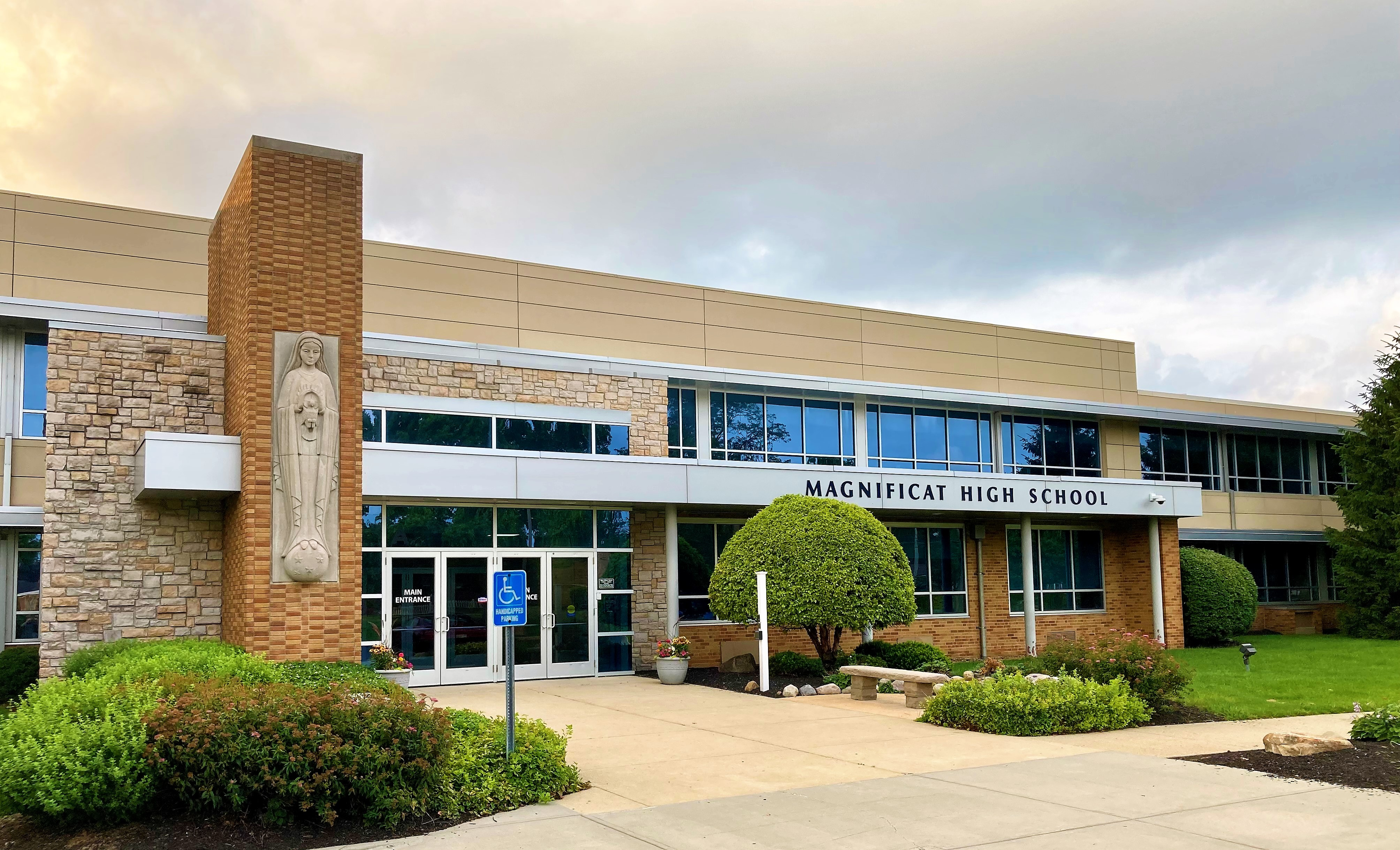

Location
- 20770 Hilliard Boulevard; Rocky River, (Cuyahoga County), Ohio 44116; United States; 41°28′08″N 81°51′01″W

Information
- School type: Private, college-preparatory high school
- Religious affiliation: Catholic
- Established: 1955; 71 years ago
- President: Moira Clark
- Teaching staff: 68.1 (FTE) (2015–16)
- Grades: 9–12
- Gender: All-girls
- Enrollment: 754 (2015–16)
- Average class size: 19
- Student to teacher ratio: 11:1 (2015–16)
- Colors: Blue & white
- Mascot: Blue Streak
- Accreditation: Ohio Catholic Schools Accrediting Association; North Central Association of Colleges and Schools
- Tuition: $18,500
- Affiliation: Sisters of the Humility of Mary
- Website: Official website

Magnificat High School is a Catholic all-girls college-preparatory high school located in Rocky River, Ohio, a residential suburb west of Cleveland, Ohio. It was founded in 1955 and is sponsored by the Sisters of the Humility of Mary.

== Ohio High School Athletic Association State Championships ==
- Gymnastics - 1990, 1991, 1992, 1993, 1996, 1997, 1998, 1999, 2002, 2003
- Girls Track and field - 1993, 1994
- Girls Cross country running - 1995, 2008 2009, 2010
- Girls Volleyball - 2021
- Girls Golf - 2024, 2026

== Notable alumnae ==
- Adelaide Aquilla– Olympic shotputter
- Anne Thornton– pastry chef and food writer
- Molly Kearney– comedian, Saturday Night Live cast member
- Katie Beirne Fallon– White House director of legislative affairs under President Barack Obama
