= Brecksville–Broadview Heights High School =

Public high school located in Broadview Heights, Ohio U.S.

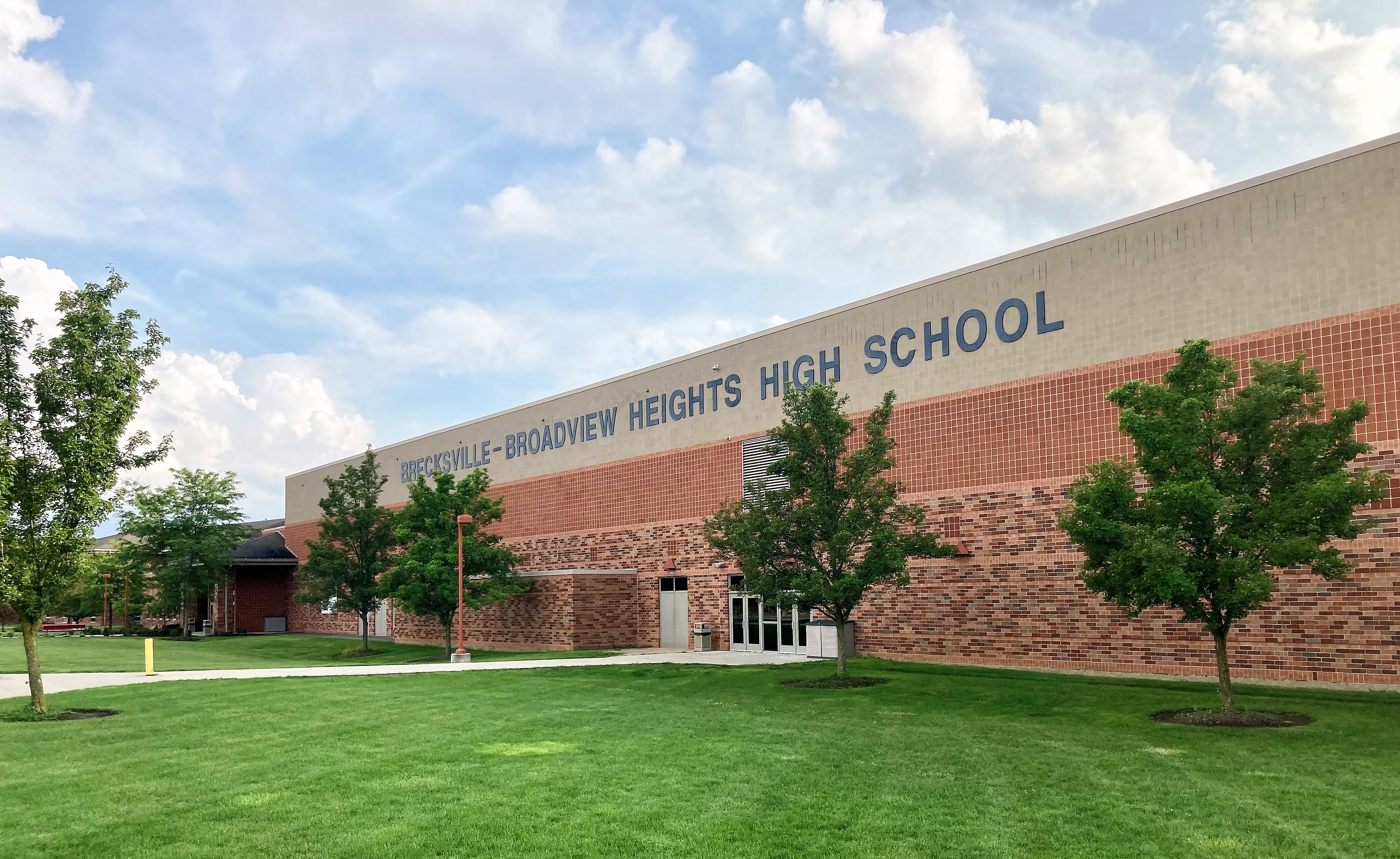

Location
- 6380 Mill Road; Broadview Heights, Ohio 44147; United States; 41.3264°N 81.6442°W

Information
- Type: Public
- Motto: Unita Fortior (United Strength is Stronger)
- Established: 1882
- Principal: Kevin Jakub
- Staff: 64.00 (FTE)
- Grades: 9–12
- Enrollment: 1,181 (2024-25
- Student to teacher ratio: 18.45
- Colors: Crimson and gold
- Fight song: On Oh Brecksville
- Athletics conference: Suburban League; National Division
- Team name: Bees
- Rival: North Royalton High School
- Newspaper: HyBreeze
- Website: highschool.bbhcsd.org

Brecksville–Broadview Heights High School is a public high school located in Broadview Heights, Ohio, United States. The school serves students grades 9–12. Students come from the communities of Brecksville, Broadview Heights, and very small segments of North Royalton and Independence. Athletic teams are known as the Bees, and they compete as a member of the Ohio High School Athletic Association in the Suburban League. The gymnastics team has won 23 straight titles and has been described as "America's greatest high school sports dynasty".

== History ==
Brecksville–Broadview Heights High School traces its origins to 1882, when the first high school serving the Brecksville community was established in northern Brecksville, Ohio. As the surrounding communities grew throughout the 20th century, the school system expanded and eventually unified students from Brecksville and neighboring Broadview Heights, Ohio into a single district and high school.

During the mid-1900s, Brecksville High School developed into a regional secondary school serving the area’s growing suburban population. The district later adopted the name Brecksville–Broadview Heights City School District, reflecting the partnership between the two cities and their shared commitment to public education. The modern high school campus was built near the border of Brecksville and Broadview Heights, creating a central location for students from both communities.

In September 2004, President George W. Bush, running for re-election, made a Saturday morning "town hall-style visit" at the school. A crowd of about 4,000 filled the gymnasium to see Bush speak and answer audience questions. An additional 500 people watched on a large screen from a secondary gymnasium.

== Student achievements ==
=== Academic rankings ===
The Brecksville–Broadview Heights High School has received various awards for excellence in education. In 2008, the U.S. Department of Education recognized Brecksville–Broadview Heights High School as an NCLB Blue Ribbon School. Brecksville–Broadview Heights High School was also a past nominee, by the Ohio Department of Education, for the prestigious Blue-Ribbon School Award.

In 2015, The Washington Post published the list of America's most challenging high schools. The analysis covered approximately 22,000 U.S. public high schools. The rankings were determined by taking the total number of Advanced Placement, International Baccalaureate and Advanced International Certificate of Education tests given at a school each year and dividing by the number of seniors that graduated. Brecksville–Broadview Heights High School ranked in the top 4 percent of all high schools in this assessment.

Brecksville–Broadview Heights High School has consistently been ranked by U.S. News & World Report magazine as being in the top 5 percent of all high schools in the United States. The school was recognized in Newsweek magazine's 2013 list of the top 2000 public high schools in the United States.

Brecksville–Broadview Heights School District was ranked the ninth best in the state of Ohio and the third best in the Cleveland-Akron-Canton area in the 2023 state report cards.

=== Art and writing awards ===
In 2015, 27 Brecksville-Broadview Heights middle and high school art students received a total of 36 regional awards through the 35th Annual Scholastic Art & Writing Awards competition. Five students who were awarded Gold Keys had their artwork judged on the national level in New York.

=== Music ===
Brecksville–Broadview Heights High School offers multiple music classes such as the band, choir, and orchestra.

The band program is made up of the Marching Bees, three concert bands (Wind Ensemble, Concert Winds, and Symphonic Band), Jazz Ensemble, Percussion Ensemble, Pep Band, and Flagline. There are 2 orchestras, chamber and symphonic. Symphonic Choir, Men's Choir, Treble Choir, Chamber Choir, and Music in Motion also perform throughout the year. The music department also consists of clubs such as the Tri-M Honors Music Society.

== Athletics ==
=== Gymnastics ===
The BBHHS girls gymnastics team has won 23 consecutive state titles from 2004-2026. Gym World, a prominent private gymnastics gym helps with training and allows club gymnasts to compete for the high school team. Most athletes do not go on to compete at the college level.

=== State championships ===
BBHHS athletic teams are known as the Bees, and are members of the Suburban League. The Bees have won numerous state titles including:

- Girls' gymnastics – 1994, 2000, 2001, 2004, 2005, 2006, 2007, 2008, 2009, 2010, 2011, 2012, 2013, 2014, 2015, 2016, 2017, 2018, 2019, 2020, 2021, 2022, 2023, 2024, 2025, 2026 (most in the OHSAA)
- Football – 1983
- Boys' soccer – 1981, 1992, 1993
- Girls' cross country – 2007
- Volleyball – 2016
- Boys' wrestling – 2015

== Notable alumni ==
=== Writers ===
- Kathryn Reiss, author of children's and young adult fiction

=== Scientists ===
- Michael T. Good, NASA astronaut

=== Media and entertainment ===
- Ann Liguori, sports radio and television broadcaster

=== Sports ===
- Steve Gillespie, professional soccer player in the Professional Arena Soccer League
- Joshua McAdams, Olympic steeplechase runner
- Eric Musselman, head coach in college basketball and the National Basketball Association (NBA)
- Mike Rose, football player in the National Football League (NFL)
- Scott Roth, basketball player in the NBA and head coach in the National Basketball League (NBL)
- Tom Tupa, football player in the National Football League (NFL)
- Sam Wiglusz, college football wide receiver for the Ohio Bobcats
- Nick Zakelj, football player in the National Football League (NFL)
