= Mariemont High School =

Public school in Mariemont, Ohio, US

Location
- 1 Warrior Way; Mariemont, (Hamilton County), Ohio 45227; United States; 39°8′41.5″N 84°21′51.3″W

Information
- Type: Public, Coeducational high school
- Motto: "Work Hard. Create Experiences. Embrace Growth."
- Established: April 14, 1879
- School district: Mariemont City School District
- Superintendent: Steven Estepp
- Principal: James Renner
- Teaching staff: 35.49 (FTE)
- Grades: 9-12
- Student to teacher ratio: 12.74
- Campus type: Suburban
- Colors: Blue and Gold
- Slogan: "Warrior Pride! Warrior Spirit!”
- Fight song: "Fight, Fight, Fight, for Mariemont!"
- Athletics conference: Cincinnati Hills League
- Mascot: Warrior
- Team name: Warriors
- Rival: Madeira High School and Wyoming High School
- Accreditation: North Central Association of Colleges and Schools
- Newspaper: MHS Blueprint
- Website: Official Website

Mariemont High School is a public high school located in Mariemont, a suburb of Cincinnati, Ohio. It is the only high school in the Mariemont City School District. Mariemont High School is known for its high academic standards, and it has been named a Blue Ribbon School of Excellence four separate times: 1984-85, 1988–89, 2001–02, 2004-05. The school was the first to receive this award four times in the state of Ohio and the fourth nationwide.

== History ==
The school was originally housed in the building that now holds Mariemont Elementary School. In 1970, a new school was constructed, designed by architects Baxter, Hodell, Donnelly and Preston. A large portion of the building featured an open, modular design with hexagonal "pods" with department offices in the center. The pods had no walls or clearly defined borders between classrooms, no hallways, and no windows in class areas. Each pod was described to be equivalent to six standard classrooms. Students were relatively free to move about within the pods. Subjects requiring seclusion, such as music, were in more traditional classrooms.

The open design was soon found to make it difficult for students, with one staff member estimating that 20% of students could not function in the open, self-directed environment. Within a few years, bookcases and partitions were used to break up the pods into classroom-like areas, but in many cases it was still possible to hear adjacent classes.

In the 2018 midterm elections, the district passed a levy to renovate half of the school and completely rebuild the other.

In 2024, a student at the school informed authorities that another student was planning a school shooting at the school, with encouragement from an out-of-state adult. A fourteen-year-old suspect was arrested and prosecutors plan to try them as an adult for conspiracy to commit aggravated murder. Congressman Greg Landsman invited the student who raised the alarm to be his guest at that State of the Union address that March.

== Extra curricular ==
=== Music ===
- Band
- Concert Orchestra
- Chamber Orchestra
- Concert Choir
- Chamber Choir
- Showstoppers (After-school a capella group)

=== Latin Club ===
Mariemont High School's Latin Club functions as a local chapter of both the Ohio Junior Classical League (OJCL) and National Junior Classical League (NJCL). In 2018, the freshmen Certamen team won the state championships at the intermediate level.

=== Newspaper ===
The Mariemont Blueprint (Formerly The Warpath) is Mariemont High School's student newspaper. Students enrolled in the MHS Journalism Class write articles for the paper.

== Sports ==
Mariemont is member of the Cincinnati Hills League (CHL). The league consists of other small schools from the suburbs of Cincinnati. Mariemont offers 24 varsity sports.

=== Ohio High School Athletic Association State Championships ===
- Boys Soccer - 2020
- Girls Soccer - 2026
- Girls Lacrosse - 2018, 2021, 2022
- Boys Lacrosse - 2007, 2013, 2014, 2017, 2021
- Boys Basketball - 1953
- Boys Track and Field* - 1949
- Boys Baseball* - 1945

* Titles won by Plainville High School prior to consolidation into Mariemont.

== Notable alumni ==
- Karl G. Henize '45* - NASA Astronaut and Astronomical Scientist

* Did not graduate due to enlistment in U.S Navy

- Patricia Villegas '87 – Dominican Republic Ambassador to Brazil
- Mark Lippert '91 - US Ambassador to South Korea
- Erik Swanson '12 - Major League Baseball pitcher
- Nick Thoman '04 - US Swim and Dive Team Member, Olympic Silver Medalist
