= Bishop Watterson High School (Columbus, Ohio) =

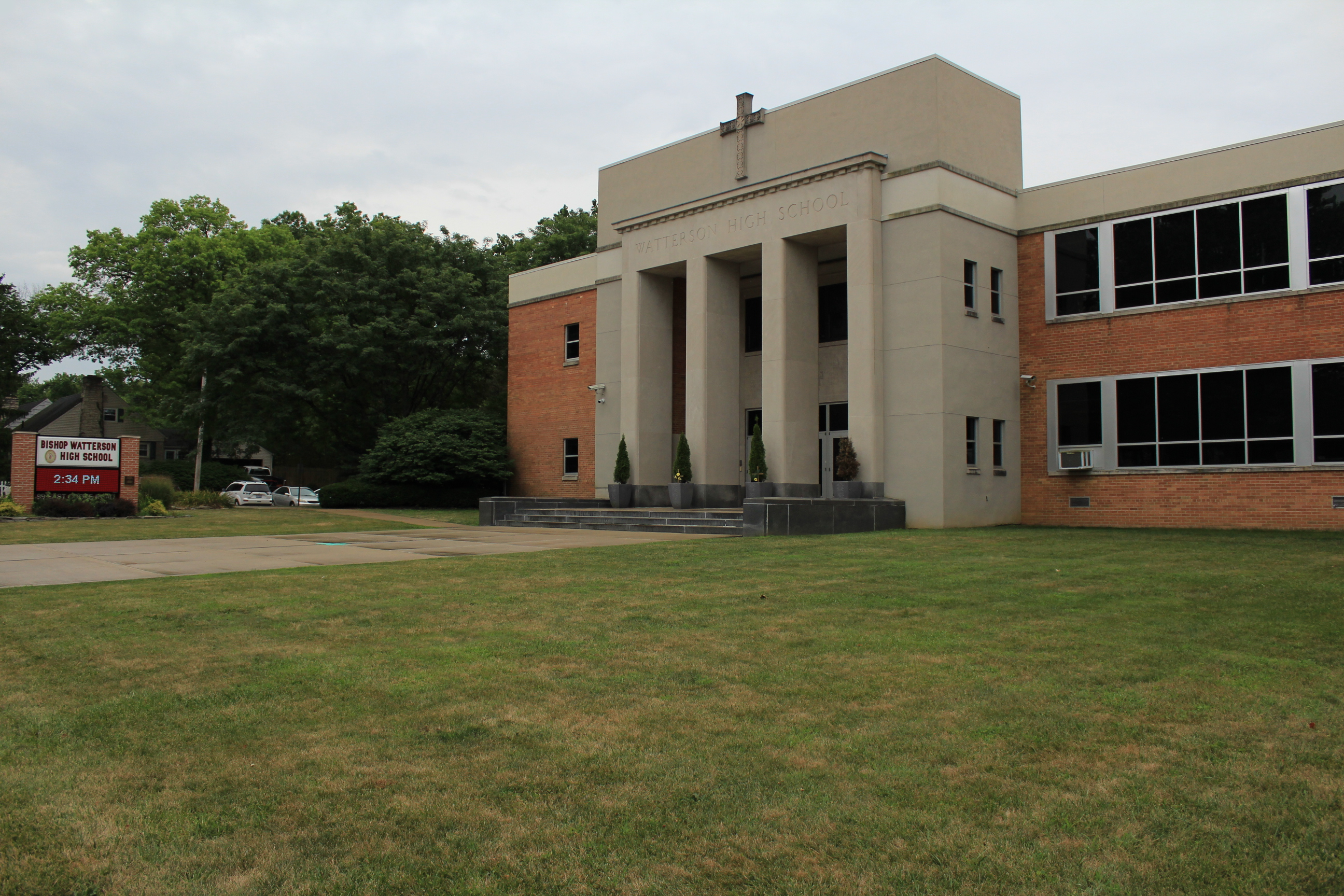
- Front entrance of Bishop Watterson High School in 2020

Location
- 99 East Cooke Road; Columbus, Ohio 43214; United States; 40°2′55″N 83°0′59″W

Information
- School type: Private High School
- Religious affiliation: Roman Catholic
- Established: 1954
- Oversight: Diocese of Columbus
- Principal: Chris Campbell
- Teaching staff: 87
- Grades: 9-12
- Colors: Cardinal red and Vegas Gold
- Athletics conference: Central Catholic League
- Mascot: Eagle
- Team name: Eagles
- Rival: St. Francis DeSales High School
- Newspaper: News from the Nest
- Yearbook: Eagle Spirit
- Website: http://www.bishopwatterson.com/

Bishop Watterson High School is a Catholic college preparatory high school located in Columbus, Ohio, United States.

== History ==
Bishop Watterson High School, founded in 1954 under the auspices of the Diocese of Columbus, is a co-educational college preparatory institution serving the Central Ohio area. Bishop Watterson High School was the first co-educational diocesan high school in Franklin County. It opened its doors in the fall of 1954 in honor of Bishop John Ambrose Watterson, the second Bishop of Columbus, who served until April 17, 1899. Its namesake, Bishop John Ambrose Watterson was known as a spiritual leader and scholar who was dedicated to Catholic education. He increased the number of diocesan schools because he saw them as essential to the moral and intellectual development of young Catholics.

== Athletics ==
Sports that are offered include baseball, basketball, bowling, cross country, diving, field hockey, football, ice hockey, golf, lacrosse, soccer, softball, swimming, tennis, track and field, volleyball and wrestling. in 2019, Bishop Watterson began playing its home football games at Ohio Dominican University.

====== State Championships ======
- Baseball - 1988, 1991, 1997
- Boys basketball - 2013
- Boys golf - 1972, 1973, 1974, 1976, 2004
- Boys lacrosse - 2025
- Boys soccer - 2025, 2026
- Boys wrestling - 2025, 2026
- Football – 2002, 2010, 2024, 2025
- Girls cross country - 2025
- Girls field hockey - 1995, 2005, 2009, 2020, 2021
- Girls lacrosse - 2023
- Girls soccer - 2024

== Notable alumni ==
- Jorge Aguirre (author) - author and children's television show producer
- Mike Durant - professional baseball player
- John Krimm - professional football player
- Erin McDougald - jazz vocalist
- Sacha Pfeiffer - Pulitzer-Prize winning journalist
- Kyle Reifers - professional golfer
- Tim Timmons - MLB Umpire
- Al Washington - football coach
- Jai Chabria - political strategist and advisor to Ohio Governor John Kasich
