= Columbus Academy =

Private school in Gahanna, Ohio, US

Location
- 4300 Cherry Bottom Road; Gahanna, Ohio 43230; United States; 40°2′56″N 82°52′26″W

Information
- Type: Private, coeducational
- Motto: "In Quest of the Best"
- Founded: 1911
- Principal: Corinna Izokaitis (Upper School); Shaka Arnold (Middle School); Mark Hansen (Lower School)
- Head of school: Melissa Soderberg
- Faculty: 140
- Grades: 3YO – 12
- Enrollment: 1,162 (2024–25 school year)
- Average class size: 15
- Student to teacher ratio: 8:1
- Campus: Suburban
- Campus size: 231 acres
- Colors: Maroon and gray
- Athletics conference: Central Buckeye League
- Mascot: Vlad and Vicky the Vikings
- Nickname: Vikings, and informally "Vikes," commonly used by Academy students and alumni
- Rival: Bexley Lions
- Accreditation: North Central Association of Colleges and Schools
- Newspaper: The Academy Life
- Yearbook: Caravel
- Tuition: $27,900 to $37,100
- Website: www.columbusacademy.org

Columbus Academy (CA) is an independent college-preparatory school for students from pre-kindergarten to twelfth grade. The school is located on a large, secluded campus surrounded by wooded areas in Gahanna, Ohio, United States, 8 miles from downtown Columbus. The academy was founded in 1911 by J. L. Hamill near Bexley, Ohio, and moved to its current campus in 1968. Originally an all-boys school, it became coeducational in 1991 when the board of trustees decided to admit girls. From its conception, the school expanded over time to a matriculation level of 1,000 students. Columbus Academy students and alumni often refer to the school as "Academy."

== Founding and original campus ==
In 1911, a group of area businessmen founded the school to provide a local option for boys' secondary education. They adopted the independent country day school philosophy that academic preparation was a cooperative effort between the school and the home.

Columbus Academy's first campus was situated on 4 acres (1.6 ha) along Alum Creek. Numerous additions to the "main house" were made as the number of students in grades 5-12 grew. Academy's first headmaster, Frank P.R. Van Syckel, instituted a liberal arts program and athletic instruction.

== Move to current campus ==
After continued enrollment growth and repeated flooding along Alum Creek, the Board approved a 20-year plan for relocation. The school acquired 231 acres (93 ha) in Gahanna (eight miles northeast of Columbus), raised funds, and built a new campus. The original five-building complex served the school well until the student body exceeded 600 boys. In the mid-1970s, the school undertook a major building program that added a lower school wing and the Schoedinger Theatre. This expansion allowed kindergarten to be added to the school in the early 1980s. In 1991, the school became co-educational.

The school is situated on a secluded suburban campus. In 1999, the school built a new library reminiscent of its old Bexley campus, and added large additions to the theatre and Lower and Upper schools in 2004. Beginning in 2003, they added another expansion, larger than the last. This consisted of a new athletic building, new sports facilities and courts, additional parking lots, a new upper school wing, and a third library (totaling three libraries: one lower school, one middle school, and one upper school).

In the 2014–2015 school year, a ropes course and a new playground were added to the Columbus Academy campus.

== Athletics ==
Today, academy students compete interscholastically and intramurally in football, soccer, track, baseball, basketball, tennis, golf, lacrosse, wrestling, field hockey, swimming, cross country, and other sports. Their main rival is Bexley High School, who generally dominates in athletic events.

=== Ohio High School Athletic Association Team State championships ===
- Baseball – 1982
- American football – 1987, 2003
- Boys Soccer – 1995
- Boys Golf – 1983, 1991, 1995, 1997, 1998, 1999, 2014, 2017, 2018, 2019, 2020, 2021
- Girls Golf – 2022, 2023, 2024, 2025, 2026
- Boys Track and Field – 1977, 1981, 2012, 2013
- Girls Field Hockey – 1994, 1997, 1999, 2000, 2001, 2003, 2004, 2006, 2012, 2013, 2018, 2019

==== Other non-OHSAA titles ====
- Boys Tennis – 2008, 2009, 2010
- Girls Tennis – 2008
- Girls Lacrosse – 1998, 2000, 2011, 2015

== Accreditation and memberships ==
- National Association of Independent Schools
- Independent Schools Association of the Central States
- Ohio Association of Independent Schools
- Recipient of Malone Family Foundation Award

== Notable alumni ==
- Robert Bradway – CEO of Amgen ('81)
- Morgan Harper – lawyer and activist
- Martin Nesbitt – businessman, founder and chief executive officer of The Parking Spot
- Todd Park – chief technology officer of the United States, former CTO of the Department of Health and Human Services, co-founder of athenahealth
- Andrew Romanoff – politician, former speaker of the Colorado House of Representatives

== Notable faculty ==
- Jeffrey Sutton – former history teacher and soccer coach; judge for the U.S. Court of Appeals for the Sixth Circuit
