= Beavercreek High School =

Public, coeducational high school in Beavercreek, Ohio, United States

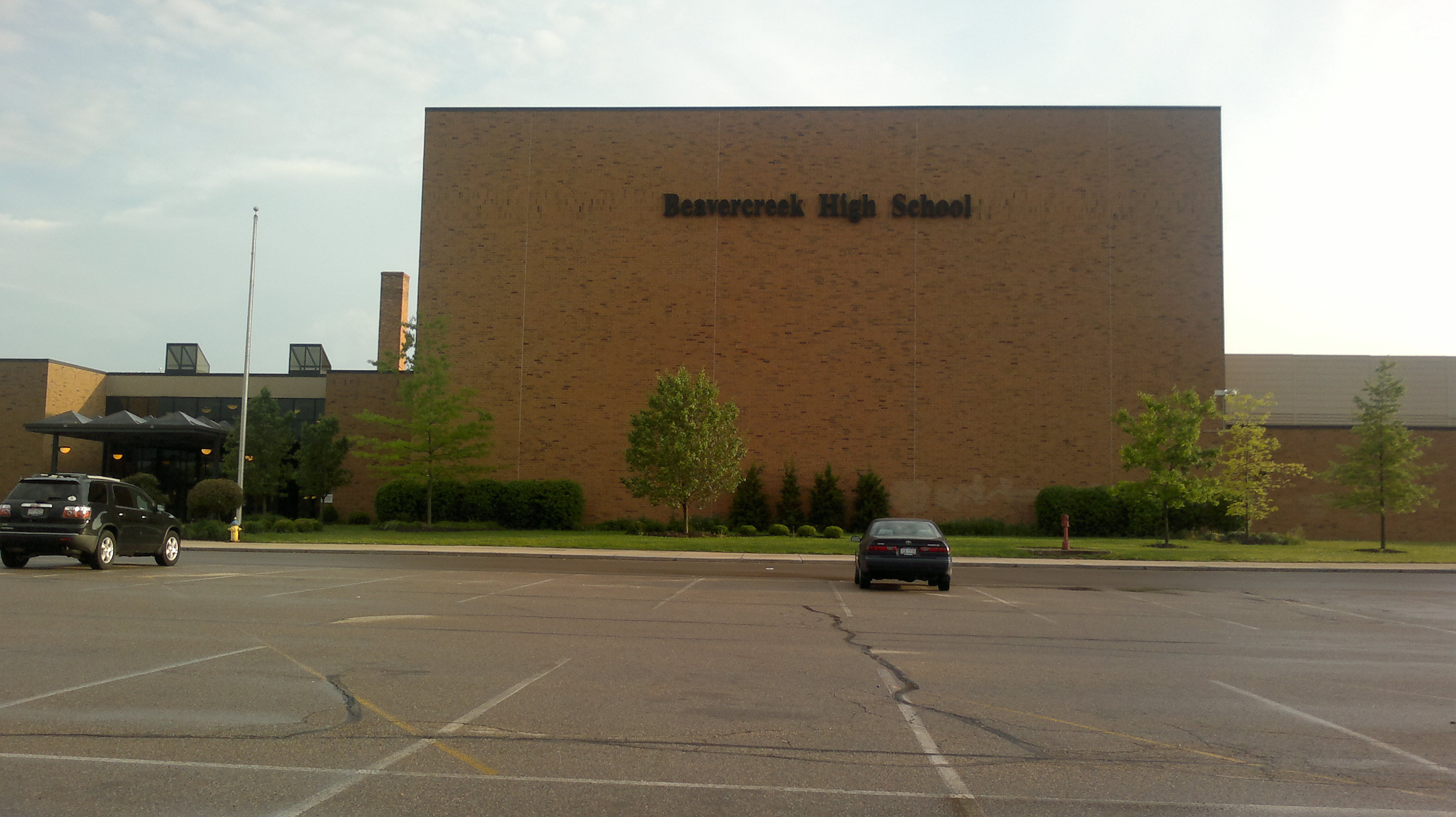

Location
- 2660 Dayton Xenia Road; Beavercreek, (Greene County), Ohio 45434; United States
- Coordinates: 39°43′13″N 84°2′2″W

Information
- Type: Public, Coeducational high school
- Motto: Home of the Beavers
- Established: 1888
- School district: Beavercreek City School District Beavercreek, Ohio
- Superintendent: Paul Otten
- Head Principle: Laura Bailey
- Principal: Jason Scott
- Principal: Scott Jacobs
- Principal: Kate Ratliff
- Staff: 77.00 (FTE)
- Grades: 9-12
- Enrollment: 1,632 (2023-2024)
- Average class size: 26
- Student to teacher ratio: 21.19
- Campus size: 308,700 sq ft
- Colors: Black and Orange
- Slogan: Inspiring today, preparing for tomorrow.
- Fight song: On Wisconsin
- Athletics conference: Greater Western Ohio Conference
- Mascot: Bucky the Beaver
- Team name: Beavers
- Accreditation: North Central Association of Colleges and Schools
- Newspaper: The Beacon
- Yearbook: Beaver Tales

Beavercreek High School is a public high school in Beavercreek, Ohio. The high school is part of Beavercreek City School District. The high school has an enrollment of more than 2,300 students. The high school campus consists of Ferguson Hall, a free-standing building that houses the ninth-grade students, and the main building, which accommodates the remaining grades (10–12). The principal is Laura Bailey for the 2025–2026 school year and the school's mascot is the Battling Beaver.

Beavercreek High School offers eleven Advanced Placement (AP) classes to students, in addition to many Honors and Scholarship courses which award additional points to the compiled grade point average (GPA) of each student.

== History ==
The first high school in Beavercreek Township was built in 1888 at the southwest corner of Factory Road and Dayton-Xenia Road, the present site of Ritters Frozen Custard. Recognized as the second high school in the state of Ohio, the initial enrollment was 20 pupils. Freshmen and sophomores occupied the south room, while juniors and seniors attended class in the north room. Two additional rooms were added in 1914 to accommodate increasing enrollment.

In 1932, the township's entire school system was consolidated into a newly constructed school at the corner of Hanes Road and Dayton-Xenia Road as a result of the increasing demands from both enrollment and the State Board of Education. The school later became known as Main Elementary School after a new high school opened in 1954 at its present location on Dayton-Xenia Rd. The original high school was used as an apartment residence for several years, but later changed hands among several businesses in the area including Marshall Brothers and the Mead paper company. Its last known usage was as a restaurant known as LaMachey's; however, the building was torn down after the restaurant caught fire.

On January 3, 1964, a U.S. Air Force B-57 bomber narrowly missed crashing into the school building, after the pilot was forced to eject while en route to Wright-Patterson Air Force Base in Dayton. The largest section of the wreckage landed within a few feet of the school; Principal Roger Sweet told reporters afterward, "We were just real, real fortunate."

Beavercreek's school system was redistricted several times since the 1970s, changing the high school back and forth between a three-year system and four-year system. The latest change occurred in 2013 with the opening of Trebein Elementary and Jacob Coy Middle School, both schools operating in one building. Ferguson Middle School became Ferguson Hall for ninth graders as part of a campus formation with Beavercreek High School. Following the relocation of ninth graders, the high school became a three-year system housing grades 10–12.

Several proposed levies to fund the construction of a new high school in the district have been rejected by voters over the years, with the most recent rejection occurring on May 6, 2025. The most recent levy, if approved, would have increased property taxes to finance the construction of the new high school. Under the proposal, the existing high school would have been repurposed as a middle school for grades 6–8, and high school students would have been relocated to the new facility upon its completion.

== Student statistics ==
According to the Ohio Department of Education, in the 2005–2006 school year, there are 23 students per full-time employed teacher. 88% of the students are White American, 6% are Asian American or Pacific Islander American, 3% are multiracial, 2% are African American, and 2% are Hispanic. The total per pupil expenditures is $7,055, compared to the state average of $9,052 The attendance rate is 93%, and the graduation rate is 96 percent.

== Athletics ==
The school's girls basketball team averaged over 18 wins per season under coach Ed Zink's 36-year tenure. On February 10, 2011, Zink became the first girls high school basketball coach in state history to reach 658 wins.

=== State championships ===
- Baseball – 1941, 1952, 1953
- Boys' bowling – 2015, 2023, 2024
- Boys' soccer – 2017
- Boys' cross Country – 2025
- Boys' swimming - 2022
- Girls' basketball – 1995, 2001, 2003
- Girls' cross country – 1996, 2018, 2019
- Girls' bowling – 2007, 2014
- Girls' soccer - 2018

=== Track renovation ===
Because of a deteriorating track, in 2008, $1.3 million was spent by Miami Valley Hospital to renovate it. The new track includes an all-season surface. The grass football field was also replaced with artificial turf. Another benefit is that the athletes will be able to use athletic-related services from the hospital. The new facility was named Frank Zink Field at Miami Valley Hospital Stadium, which is a slight change from the previous name, "Frank Zink Field."

== Clubs and extra-curricular activities ==
The high school's Speech and Debate team earned five of the thirteen award positions, the most of any school in competition, in the regional national qualifiers for Student Congress in 2010.

== Accomplishments ==
- The school's Science Bowl team competed in the 2006 National Science Bowl, and qualified again in 2007. It also qualified for the National Science Bowl in 2000 and 2004.
- The school's National History Bowl team won the 2017 Junior Varsity National Championships, as well as the 2019 Varsity National Championships.
- The school's Quiz Bowl team won the NAQT 2019 High School National Championship Tournament

== Notable alumni ==
- Alison Bales (class of 2003) – WNBA player
- Marjorie Corcoran (class of 1968) – particle physicist
- Bobby Durnbaugh – Major League Baseball player
- Mike Hauschild – Major League Baseball pitcher
- Christopher R. Johnson (class of 1978) - Distinguished Professor of Computer Science
- Jarrod Martin – former Ohio state representative
- Justin Masterson – Major League Baseball pitcher
- Joe Moore (class of 1965) – news anchor, actor and playwright
- Jill Paice (class of 1998) – actress and singer
- Aftab Pureval (class of 2001) – Mayor of Cincinnati
- Mikaela Ruef – Women's National Basketball League player
- Janet C. Wolfenbarger (class of 1976) – retired four-star general in the U.S. Air Force
