= St. Ursula Academy (Cincinnati, Ohio) =

Saint Ursula

Location
- 1339 East McMillan Street; Cincinnati, (Hamilton County), Ohio; 45206-2164; United States; 39°7′29″N 84°28′54″W

Information
- Type: Private, College-Preparatory
- Religious affiliation: Roman Catholic
- Established: 1910
- CEEB code: 361105
- President: Lelia Keefe Kramer '77
- Principal: Kathy Restle
- Teaching staff: 57.8 <"NCES"/>
- Grades: 9–12
- Gender: All-Girls
- Average class size: 165
- Student to teacher ratio: 11.2
- Colors: Blue and gold
- Athletics conference: Girls' Greater Catholic League
- Mascot: bulldog
- Team name: Bulldogs
- Rival: Ursuline Academy
- Accreditation: AdvancED; Ohio Catholic School Accrediting Association; North Central Association of Colleges and Schools
- School fees: $600/year technology fee for tablet program (2018–2019); $4,790.00 Educational Services Program Fee (2018–19)
- Tuition: $16,500 in 2018-2019
- Website: http://www.saintursula.org

St. Ursula Academy, located in the East Walnut Hills neighborhood of Cincinnati, Ohio, is a Catholic college-preparatory high school for young women that offers an intensive four-year program in the fields of English, mathematics, science, social studies, French, Spanish, Latin, and religion. An entrance test is required of all prospective freshmen students. Academic scholarships are also based on the results of this test. The school's Educational Services Program (ESP) assists girls with learning disabilities.

== History ==
St. Ursula Academy was established in 1910 by the newly founded Ursuline community as a private academy for students from kindergarten through the twelfth grade. The sisters had an enrollment of sixty-three pupils that first year when classes were held in a house they rented at Ingleside and McMillan. The following year the school was in session at 1339 East McMillan in the Worcester residence, which the sisters had recently purchased. In December 1910, the community acquired the Schuster-Martin building. The facilities were enhanced in 1915 with the building of a chapel wing, which connected the two original buildings and also provided enlarged kitchen and dining areas. About the same time, the far west building was built by Bellamy Storer and his wife, Maria Longworth Nichols Storer, as their residence. When the Storers died, the building became the property of the sisters and was utilized for additional classroom space. In 1952 two smaller houses adjacent to the west wing were purchased. The original gym-auditorium was added in 1954. Every inch of space was used to the fullest to accommodate the growing number of students. A new classroom wing was added to St. Ursula in 1967.

For several years the McMillan Street site was the school for grades one through twelve. In 1960 the purchase of the twenty-five acre LeBlond estate in Mt. Lookout enabled the community to provide space for the elementary division, known as St. Ursula Villa. Unlike the high school, the Villa is coeducational. Although the Villa is not officially part of St. Ursula Academy, more than 60% of its recent female graduates went on to attend the Academy. More than 60% of its recent male graduates went on to attend St. Xavier High School.

St. Ursula Academy is now chartered as a four-year college preparatory high school, and grades seven and eight are located at the Villa. November 1985 marked the seventy-fifth anniversary of St. Ursula's foundation. With the generous support of alumnae, friends, and parents, the physical plant underwent an extensive renovation, enabling the school to accommodate an increasing number of students.

From the beginning until the 1990s, St. Ursula Academy was owned and operated by the Ursulines of Cincinnati. From its earliest days, however, the support and assistance of lay alumnae, parents, and friends were critical for its success. In the late 1970s, the sisters formalized that support by establishing the Advisory Board. In 1994 St. Ursula Academy was incorporated as a separate entity and is now governed by a board of trustees. In 1999 St. Ursula Academy purchased the McMillan Street property from the Ursulines of Cincinnati. In March 2000, the two small buildings at the comer of Upland and Fleming Streets were demolished to make room for the construction of a new academic building. This building encompasses four levels and provides eight new science classrooms/labs, 10 general classrooms, and two music rooms. In June 2002, construction began on a gymnasium/convocation center and was completed in June 2003.

In April 2017, the nearby University of Cincinnati announced that its women's basketball and women's volleyball teams would play their home games in the 2017–18 school year at the St. Ursula Gymnasium & Convocation Center while the teams' normal home of Fifth Third Arena undergoes renovations.

== Tablet PC program ==
The one-on-one tablet PC program was introduced with the class of 2010 to aid in St. Ursula Academy's mission of preparing women for a changing world. All students now use the tablets daily in class, and their classes are expected to be "paperless" for the most part. St. Ursula was the first school in Cincinnati to have this program, and many schools now look to Saint Ursula for guidance in developing and enhancing their own one-to-one programs.

== Clubs and activities ==
St. Ursula's Latin Club functions as a local chapter of both the Ohio Junior Classical League (OJCL) and National Junior Classical League (NJCL).

== Ohio High School Athletic Association State Championships ==
- Girls Golf - 1994,1997
- Girls Soccer – 1991, 1993, 2007, 2008
- Girls Volleyball – 1993, 1994, 1995, 1996, 1997, 1998, 2001, 2003, 2024
- Girls Swimming – 1993, 1994, 1995
- Girls Cross Country – 2006
- Girls Field Hockey - 2010

== Notable alumnae ==
- Tori Huster - NWSL midfielder for Washington Spirit
- Aubrey Kingsbury - NWSL goalie for Washington Spirit
- Heather Mitts - Olympic soccer star (3-time gold medalist) and ESPN analyst
- M.A. Vignola - NWSL defender for Angel City FC
