= Thomas Worthington High School =

Location
- 300 West Dublin Granville Road; Worthington, Ohio 43085; United States; 40°5′26″N 83°1′32″W

Information
- Type: Public, coeducational high school
- Opened: 1952
- Sister school: Worthington Kilbourne High School
- School district: Worthington City School District
- Superintendent: Trent Bowers
- Principal: Josh Almanson
- Teaching staff: 102.90 (FTE)
- Grades: 9-12
- Enrollment: 1,738 (2025-2026)
- Student to teacher ratio: 16.89
- Schedule: 8:40 - 3:20
- Colors: Blue and red
- Song: "Oh, Worthington" (Words and Music by Henry Shuster, 1955)
- Fight song: Stand Up and Cheer
- Athletics conference: Ohio Capital Conference
- Nickname: Cardinals
- Rivals: Worthington Kilbourne; Upper Arlington; Columbus Academy (CA)
- Accreditation: North Central Association of Colleges and Schools
- Publication: Flock Talk
- Newspaper: TWHS News (twhsnews.com)
- Website: twhs.worthington.k12.oh.us

Thomas Worthington High School (TWHS) is a public school in Worthington, Ohio. The school was named Worthington High School until 1991, when sister school, Worthington Kilbourne High School, opened.

With approximately 1700 students, TWHS is the largest school in the Worthington City School District. Its mascot is the cardinal, and the school colors are red and blue. A map of the district divisions is located here.

Within the Worthington City School District, Worthingway Middle School, Kilbourne Middle School, and Phoenix Middle School students who would traditionally go to Worthingway or Kilbourne feed in to TWHS.

== Clubs and activities ==
=== Clubs and organizations ===
TWHS offers many clubs and organizations to its students.

- In-the-Know - An academic quiz team
- Jazz Band
- Theatre
- Marching Band
- Ski Club
- Mock Trial Team - A team that competes in the Ohio High School Mock Trial competition
- Pit Orchestra
- Science Olympiad
- Student Council
- Key Club
- Brunch Club
- FIRST Robotics - A part of the FIRST Robotics Program allowing students to explore robotics and compete on an international scale.
- Winter Guard
- Indoor Percussion
- Sound Effects Club - A club that pursued activities relating to sound effects

== Athletics ==
The following sports are available to students:

- Baseball sports
- Basketball
- Bowling
- Cheerleading
- Cross country
- Field hockey
- Football
- Golf
- Gymnastics
- Ice hockey
- Lacrosse
- Marching band
- Soccer
- Softball
- Swimming
- Tennis
- Track and field
- Volleyball
- Water polo
- Wrestling

=== Ohio High School Athletic Association State Championships ===
- Boys baseball - 1981
- Boys golf - 1938, 1978, 1983
- Boys soccer - 1991, 1998, 2001
- Boys track - 1997, 1999, 2017
- Boys cross country - 1967
- Boys gymnastics - 1987
- Girls cross country - 1989, 1992
- Girls field hockey - 1988, 2007, 2011, 2015, 2016, 2017, 2022, 2023, 2024, 2025
- Girls gymnastics - 1985, 1986, 1987, 1988, 1989
- Girls swimming - 1977, 1978, 1980, 1981, 1989

=== Other athletic accomplishments ===
- State Champions - Boys water polo - 2002, 2003, 2017 (Sponsored by the Ohio High School Swim Coaches Association)
- State Champions - Boys lacrosse - 1989, 1990, 1991, 1996 (Boys Lacross State Championships Sponsored by the Ohio High School Lacrosse Association (OHSLA) 1989 through 2016)
- State Champions - Boys volleyball - 1990 (Boys Volleyball State Championships Sponsored by the Ohio High School Volleyball Coaches Association 1988 through 2022)

== Notable people ==
- Juli (Klyce) Briskman, journalist and politician (Class of 1985)
- Francis Brewu, Notre Dame football player (Class of 2024)
- Maggie Grace (Denig), actress (attended)
- Ian “Chico” Hamilton, professional soccer player in The Football League and North American Soccer League, long-time TWHS soccer coach
- Rachael Harris, actress (Class of 1986)
- Bob Hill, NBA coach (Class of 1967)
- Kosta Karageorge, Ohio State football player and wrestler (Class of 2010)
- Jim Kammerud, cartoonist and story artist (Class of 1978)
- Beth (Wagner) Liston, doctor and Ohio legislator (Class of 1993)
- Molly (Beckwith) Ludlow, middle-distance, 4 × 800 relay American record holder and two-time Olympic alternate (Class of 2005)
- Nick Mafi, writer, Architectural Digest, and great-nephew of Zia ol Din Tabatabaee (Class of 2004)
- Betty Montgomery, Ohio senator and attorney general (Class of 1966)
- Christopher Paul, convicted Al Qaeda terrorist
- Troy Perkins, Major League Soccer player, 2006 MLS Goalkeeper of the Year (Class of 1999)
- Jack Plotnick, actor (Class of 1987)
- Claire Shipman, television journalist, acting President of Columbia University (Class of 1980)
- J.K. Simmons, actor, Academy Award for Best Supporting Actor (attended)
- Jeff Smith, cartoonist, Bone (Class of 1978)
- Frank Truitt, basketball coach at Ohio State, Louisiana State University, and Kent State (Class of 1943)
- Dana Tyler, television journalist (Class of 1977)
- Robin F. Williams, painter (Class of 2001)
- John P. McConnell, CEO of Worthington Enterprises, Columbus Blue Jackets majority owner (Class of 1972)
