= Hathaway Brown School =

Girls school in Shaker Heights, Ohio, US

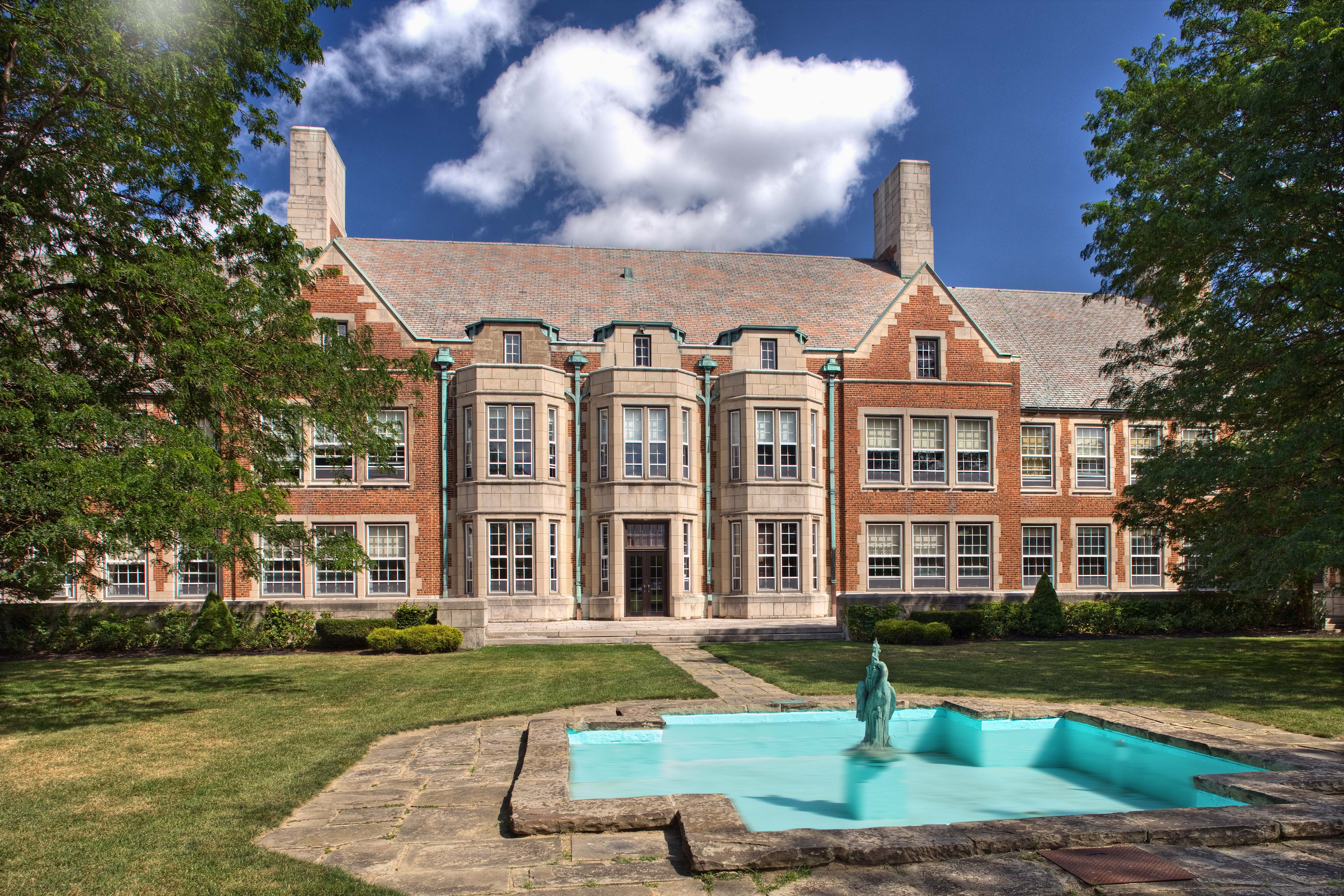

Location
- 19600 North Park Boulevard; Shaker Heights, OH; Shaker Heights, (Cuyahoga County), Ohio 44122; United States
- 41°28′54″N 81°32′30″W

Information
- Type: Private, Secular, All-Girls
- Motto: Non Scholae Sed Vitae Discimus (We learn not for school but for life)
- Religious affiliation: n/a
- Established: 1876
- Founder: Anne Hathaway Brown
- Status: Open
- School code: Uniform
- Head of school: Fran Bisselle
- Grades: Daycare-12
- Enrollment: 811 (2023-2024) (2021-2022)
- Average class size: Prime: 30 Middle: 50 High: 85
- Student to teacher ratio: 7.4:1
- Campus size: 16 acres
- Campus type: suburban
- Colors: Brown & gold
- Athletics: 11 sports
- Sports: Basketball, Cross country, Field hockey, Golf, Gymnastics, Lacrosse, Soccer, Swimming and diving, Tennis, Track and field, and Volleyball.
- Nickname: HB
- Team name: Blazers
- Rival: Laurel School
- Accreditation: North Central Association of Colleges and Schools
- USNWR ranking: 1. 1 best all girls school in Ohio
- National ranking: 1. 22 best all girls school nationally
- Newspaper: Retrospect
- Yearbook: Specularia
- Tuition: $26,400-$40,000 (K-12)
- Website: hb.edu

Hathaway Brown, commonly referred to as HB, is an all-girls private school located in Shaker Heights, Ohio. The school serves pre-kindergarten through 12th grade students.

Hathaway Brown is a member of the National Coalition of Girls' Schools, National Association of Independent Schools, and Cleveland Council of Independent Schools.

== History ==
Founded in 1876, Hathaway Brown began as "afternoon classes for young ladies" at the all-boys private Brooks Military School in downtown Cleveland. Its original name was the Brooks School for Ladies. In 1886, the school was purchased by Anne Hathaway Brown. During her tenure, Brown changed the school's name to “Miss Anne H. Hathaway Brown's School for Girls” and introduced the school motto: non scholae sed vita discimus (“we learn not for school but for life”). At that point, only women were accepted.

The building at 1945 East 97th Street was completed in 1905, and designed by the Cleveland architectural firm of Hubbell & Benes. It was later demolished. The school moved to its current location at 19600 North Park Boulevard in Shaker Heights in 1927. Mary Elizabeth Raymond (1912–38) and Ann Cutter Coburn (1938–68) were notable headmistresses.

The head of the school is Mary Frances Bisselle.

=== Ohio High School Athletic Association team state championships ===
- Girls Basketball - 2009, 2010, 2011, 2012, 2013
- Girls Field Hockey - 2008, 2002
- Girls Soccer - 2007, 2004
- Girls Golf - 2010
- Girls Swimming - 2023, 2024, 2025
- Girls Track & Field - 2025

Other non-sanctioned state championships:

- Girls Tennis -2003, 2004
- Girls Lacrosse-2010, 2012
- Girls Tennis -2013, 2014, 2015, 2016, 2017, 2018, 2019

== Accreditation and membership ==
- Founding Member, National Coalition of Girls Schools
- Independent School Association of Central States, State of Ohio
- Member, National Association of Independent Schools
