= List of OHSAA volleyball champions =

The Ohio High School Athletic Association (OHSAA) is the governing body of athletic programs for junior and senior high schools in the state of Ohio. It conducts state championship competitions in all the OHSAA-sanctioned sports.

== Girls volleyball champions ==
Year	Girls D I / AAA	Girls D II / AA	Girls D III / A	Girls D IV	Girls D V	Girls D VI	Girls D VII
2026	Cincinnati Seton	Kings Mills Kings	Cincinnati Archbishop McNicholas	Franklin Bishop Fenwick	Versallies	Dalton	Tiffin Calvert
2025	Cincinnati Seton	Avon	Tipp City Tippecanoe	Cincinnati Archbishop McNicholas	Mentor Lake Catholic	Newark Catholic	Tiffin Calvert
2024	Cincinnati Seton	Cincinnati St. Ursula Academy	Gates Mills Gilmour Academy	St.Bernard Roger Bacon	Mentor Lake Catholic	Coldwater	Fort Loramie
2023	Kings Mills Kings	Cincinnati Mercy McAuley	Mentor Lake Catholic	New Bremen			
2022	Blue Ash Ursuline Academy	Chardon Notre Dame-Cathedral Latin	Mentor Lake Catholic	New Bremen			
2021	Rocky River Magnificat	Gates Mills Gilmour Academy	Findlay Liberty-Benton	New Knoxville			
2020	Reading Mount Notre Dame	Gates Mills Gilmour Academy	Huron	Tiffin Calvert			
2019	Columbus St Francis De Sales	Franklin Bishop Fenwick	Findlay Liberty-Benton	New Bremen			
2018	Blue Ash Ursuline Academy	Parma Heights Holy Name	Versailles	Tiffin Calvert			
2017	Ursuline Academy	Parma Padua Franciscan	Versailles	New Bremen			
2016	Brecksville-Broadview Heights	Parma Padua Franciscan	Miami East	Jackson Center			
2015	Reading Mount Notre Dame	Chardon Notre Dame-Cathedral Latin	Gates Mills Gilmour Academy	Jackson Center			
2014	Reading Mount Notre Dame	Chardon Notre Dame-Cathedral Latin	Huron	Fort Loramie			
2013	Reading Mount Notre Dame	Parma Padua Franciscan	Versailles	Maria Stein Marion Local			
2012	Ursuline Academy	Cleveland Heights Beaumont	Casstown Miami East	Maria Stein Marion Local			
2011	Mount Notre Dame	Bishop Hartley	Casstown Miami East	St. Henry			
2010	Toledo St Ursula Academy	Mentor Lake Catholic	Franklin Bishop Fenwick	Sidney Lehman Catholic			
2009	Blue Ash Ursuline Academy	Parma Padua Franciscan	Huron	Maria Stein Marion Local			
2008	Olmsted Falls	Parma Padua Franciscan	Albany Alexander	Maria Stein Marion Local			
2007	Cincinnati Mother of Mercy	Toledo Central Catholic	Lima Central Catholic	Maria Stein Marion Local			
2006	Reading Mount Notre Dame	Archbishop Alter	Anna	Norwalk St Paul			
2005	Cincinnati Seton	St. Bernard Roger Bacon	Cleveland Villa-Angela/St Joseph	Sidney Lehman Catholic			
2004	Toledo St Ursula Academy	St. Bernard Roger Bacon	Newark Catholic	St. Henry			
2003	Cincinnati St Ursula Academy	Kettering Archbishop Alter	Orrville	Centerburg			
2002	Blue Ash Ursuline Academy	Kettering Archbishop Alter	Huron	St Paul			
2001	Cincinnati St Ursula Academy	St. Bernard Roger Bacon	Cleveland Villa-Angela/St Joseph	Hopewell-Loudon			
2000	Reading Mount Notre Dame	Galion	Lehman Catholic	Hopewell-Loudon			
1999	Reading Mount Notre Dame	Galion	Huron	Hopewell-Loudon			
1998	Reading Mount Notre Dame	Cincinnati St Ursula Academy	Archbold	Hopewell-Loudon			
1997	Madison Comprehensive	Cincinnati St Ursula Academy	Rockford Parkway	Hopewell-Loudon			
1996	Cincinnati Seton	Cincinnati St Ursula Academy	Rockford Parkway	New Washington Buckeye Central			
1995	Mount Notre Dame	Cincinnati St Ursula Academy	Heath	St. Henry			
1994	West Chester Lakota	Cincinnati St Ursula Academy	Lore City Buckeye Trail	St. Henry			
1993	Blue Ash Ursuline Academy	Cincinnati St Ursula Academy	Pemberville Eastwood	New Washington Buckeye Central			
1992	Stow-Munroe Falls	Archbishop Hoban	Tontogany Otsego	Antwerp			
1991	Canton McKinley	Archbishop Hoban	Loudonville	West Unity Hilltop			
1990	Stow-Munroe Falls	Archbishop Hoban	St. Henry	Fort Recovery			
1989	Reynoldsburg	Lore City Buckeye Trail	Newark Catholic				
1988	Cincinnati Seton	Fairview Park Fairview	Newark Catholic				
1987	Canton McKinley	Springfield Northwestern	St. Henry				
1986	Cincinnati Seton	Springfield Northwestern	Canal Winchester				
1985	Cincinnati Seton	Fairview Park Fairview	St. Henry				
1984	Cincinnati Seton	Springfield Northwestern	Newark Catholic				
1983	Canton McKinley	Springfield Northwestern	Newark Catholic				
1982	Cincinnati Mother of Mercy	Columbus St Francis De Sales	Newark Catholic				
1981	Stow-Munroe Falls	Highland	Archbold				
1980	Cincinnati Mother of Mercy	Archbishop Hoban	Newark Catholic				
1979	Whitehall-Yearling	Perrysburg	Newark Catholic				
1978	Kettering Fairmont	Madeira	Archbold				
1977	Cincinnati Mother of Mercy	Bexley	Milford Center Fairbanks				
1976	Kettering Fairmont West	Urbana	Frankfort Adena				
1975	Stow-Munroe Falls	Cincinnati Ursuline Academy	Frankfort Adena				

== Boys' volleyball champions ==
Year	Boys D I	Boys D II
2026	Cincinnati Archbishop Moeller	Franklin Bishop Fenwick
2025	Cleveland St. Ignatius	Cincinnati Archbishop McNicholas
2024	Cincinnati St. Xavier	Cincinnati Archbishop McNicholas
2023	Cincinnati Archbishop Moeller	Columbus St. Francis DeSales

== See also ==
- List of Ohio High School Athletic Association championships
- List of high schools in Ohio
- Ohio High School Athletic Conferences
- Ohio High School Athletic Association
