= List of OHSAA baseball champions =

The Ohio High School Athletic Association (OHSAA) is the governing body of athletic programs for junior and senior high schools in the state of Ohio. It conducts state championship competitions in all the OHSAA-sanctioned sports. As of 2019, the Baseball State Tournament is played annually at 7 17 Credit Union Park in Akron, Ohio.

== Champions ==
Year	D I / AAA	D II / AA	D III / A	D IV	D V	D VI	D VII
1928		Columbus Aquinas	Centerville				
1929		Columbus Central	Newcomerstown				
1930		Martins Ferry	St Paris				
1931		Cincinnati Woodward	Delphos Jefferson				
1932		Columbus South	Tiltonsville				
1933		Warren Warren G Harding	Congress West-Salem				
1934		Cincinnati Withrow	Mayfield Village Mayfield				
1935		St. Bernard Roger Bacon	Brookville				
1936		Norwood	Etna				
1937		Canton McKinley	Holgate				
1938		Cincinnati Hughes	Sugar Grove Berne Union				
1939		Canton McKinley	Pemberville				
1940		Columbus North	Powhatan Point				
1941		Cincinnati Withrow	Beavercreek				
1942		Tiltonsville	Reading				
1943		Cincinnati Elder	Leavittsburg				
1944		East Cleveland Shaw	Reading				
1945		Cincinnati Woodward	Plainville				
1946		Cleveland Lincoln	Reading				
1947		Cleveland Heights	Columbus Hamilton Township				
1948		Cincinnati Western Hills	Cincinnati Sycamore				
1949		Cincinnati Hughes	North Bend Taylor				
1950		Cincinnati Withrow	Batavia Amelia				
1951		Cincinnati Western Hills	Lima St Rose				
1952		Cincinnati Elder	Beavercreek				
1953		Cincinnati Purcell Marian	Beavercreek				
1954		Mansfield Senior	Waverly				
1955		Cincinnati Elder	Lockland				
1956		Cincinnati Elder	Cincinnati Greenhills				
1957		Reading	Middleport				
1958		Cincinnati Elder	Goshen				
1959		Cincinnati Elder	West Salem Northwestern				
1960		Cincinnati Elder	Baltimore Liberty Union				
1961		Cleveland South	Baltimore Liberty Union				
1962		North Bend Taylor	Van Wert Lincolnview				
1963		Euclid	Powhatan Point				
1964		Lima Senior	Baltimore Liberty Union				
1965		Shaker Heights	Versailles				
1966		Kettering Fairmont West	West Salem Northwestern				
1967		Cincinnati Western Hills	Nelsonville-York				
1968		East Cleveland Shaw	Old Fort				
1969		Columbus East	New Riegel				
1970		Dayton Chaminade	Cincinnati Lincoln Heights				
1971	Findlay	Columbus Father Wehrle Memorial	Russia				
1972	Cincinnati Archbishop Moeller	Ironton	Anna				
1973	Cincinnati Elder	St Paris Graham	Portsmouth Sciotoville Community (East)				
1974	Wickliffe	Reading	Middletown Bishop Fenwick				
1975	Columbus West	Bryan	Lucasville Valley				
1976	Shaker Heights	Elida	Leipsic				
1977	Cincinnati Western Hills	Cincinnati Deer Park	Miller City				
1978	Cincinnati Elder	Coshocton	Hicksville				
1979	Oregon Clay	Columbus St Francis De Sales	Cardington-Lincoln				
1980	Cincinnati Oak Hills	Reading	Anna				
1981	Worthington	Parma Heights Holy Name	Middletown Bishop Fenwick				
1982	Euclid	Urbana	Gahanna Columbus Academy				
1983	Hamilton	Coldwater	Ashtabula Sts John And Paul				
1984	Cincinnati Elder	Coldwater	Miller City				
1985	Fairfield	Bellevue	Graysville Skyvue				
1986	Cincinnati Western Hills	Akron St Vincent-St Mary	Toledo Ottawa Hills				
1987	Upper Arlington	Coldwater	Rockford Parkway				
1988	Columbus Bishop Watterson	Youngstown Ursuline	Newark Catholic				
1989	Cincinnati Archbishop Moeller	Akron St Vincent-St Mary	Newark Catholic				
1990	Upper Arlington	Urbana	Coldwater				
1991	Fairfield	Columbus Bishop Watterson	Hamilton Badin	Rockford Parkway			
1992	Defiance	Elyria West	Coldwater	Morral Ridgedale			
1993	Cincinnati Archbishop Moeller	Hebron Lakewood	Campbell Memorial	Cincinnati Country Day			
1994	Toledo Start	Hebron Lakewood	Ontario	Steubenville Catholic Central			
1995	Canton GlenOak	Wauseon	Bainbridge Paint Valley	Cincinnati Summit Country Day			
1996	Canton GlenOak	Hamilton Badin	Wheelersburg	Columbus Bishop Hartley			
1997	Hamilton	Columbus Bishop Watterson	Dayton Oakwood	Defiance Ayersville			
1998	Lakewood St Edward	Cincinnati Archbishop McNicholas	Plain City Jonathan Alder	Toronto			
1999	Cincinnati Elder	Cuyahoga Falls Walsh Jesuit	Cincinnati Madeira	St Henry			
2000	Toledo Start	Washington Court House Washington	Youngstown Ursuline	St Henry			
2001	Dublin Coffman	Chardon Notre Dame-Cathedral Latin	Marion Pleasant	Cincinnati Country Day			
2002	Cleveland St Ignatius	Tallmadge	Heath	Newark Catholic			
2003	Cincinnati St Xavier	Cincinnati Purcell Marian	St Henry	Newark Catholic			
2004	Cincinnati Archbishop Moeller	Cuyahoga Falls Walsh Jesuit	New Albany	Newark Catholic			
2005	Cincinnati Elder	Hebron Lakewood	Archbold	Gibsonburg			
2006	Strongsville	Cuyahoga Falls Walsh Jesuit	Marion Pleasant	Newark Catholic			
2007	West Chester Lakota West	Canfield	Heath	Fort Loramie			
2008	Lakewood St Edward	Cuyahoga Falls Walsh Jesuit	Perry Township Central Catholic	Hamler Patrick Henry			
2009	Cincinnati Archbishop Moeller	Chardon Notre Dame-Cathedral Latin	Gnadenhutten Indian Valley	Hamler Patrick Henry			
2010	Lakewood St Edward	Plain City Jonathan Alder	Bellville Clear Fork	Fort Loramie			
2011	Liberty Twp. Lakota East	Columbus St Francis De Sales	Central Catholic	Minster			
2012	Cincinnati Archbishop Moeller	Columbus St Francis De Sales	Wheelersburg	Minster			
2013	Cincinnati Archbishop Moeller	Defiance	Wheelersburg	Newark Catholic			
2014	Massillon Jackson	Bloom-Carroll	Coldwater	Defiance Tinora			
2015	Cincinnati Archbishop Moeller	Defiance	Perry Township Central Catholic	Newark Catholic			
2016	Pickerington North	Defiance	Berlin Hiland	Newark Catholic			
2017	Massillon Jackson	Tallmadge	Champion	Minster			
2018	Olentangy Liberty	Dayton Chaminade-Julienne	Canfield South Range	Fort Loramie			
2019	Cleveland St. Ignatius	Dayton Chaminade-Julienne	Coldwater	Toronto			
2020	Tournament canceled	Tournament canceled	Tournament canceled	Tournament canceled			
2021	New Albany	Akron Archbishop Hoban	Cincinnati Hills Christian Academy	Warren John F. Kennedy			
2022	Sylvania Northview	Chardon	Apple Creek Waynedale	Russia			
2023	Cincinnati Archbishop Moeller	Chargin Falls Kenston	Apple Creek Waynedale	Berlin Hiland			
2024	William Mason	Beloit West Branch	Heath	Berlin Hiland			
2025	Lewis Center Olentangy	Whitehouse Anthony Wayne	Newark Licking Valley	Mentor Lake Catholic	Apple Creek Waynedale	Berlin Hiland	Minster
2026	Cincinnati St. Xavier	New Albany	Hamilton Badin	Sandusky Perkins	Apple Creek Waynedale	Hartville Lake Center Christian	Delphos St. John

== See also ==
- List of Ohio High School Athletic Association championships
- List of high schools in Ohio
- Ohio High School Athletic Conferences
- Ohio High School Athletic Association
