= List of OHSAA cross country champions =

The Ohio High School Athletic Association (OHSAA) is the governing body of athletic programs for junior and senior high schools in the state of Ohio. It conducts state championship competitions in all the OHSAA-sanctioned sports.

== Boys' cross-country champions ==
Year	Boys D I / AAA	Boys D II / AA	Boys D III / A	Boys D IV
2026	Springboro	Bowling Green	Woodridge	Mount Gilead
2025	Beavercreek	Lexington	Woodridge	Convoy Crestview
2024	William Mason	Fairfield Union	Mount Gilead	
2023	Massillon Jackson	Marlington	Columbus Grove	
2022	William Mason	Marlington	Mount Gilead	
2021	William Mason	Marlington	East Canton	
2020	West Chester Lakota West	Woodridge	East Canton	
2019	Cincinnati St Xavier	Woodridge	Cincinnati Summit Country Day	
2018	Hudson	Woodridge	Fort Loramie	
2017	Hudson	Lexington	East Canton	
2016	Solon	Woodridge	Fort Loramie	
2015	Cleveland St. Ignatius	Lexington	Cortland Maplewood	
2014	William Mason	Tipp City Tippecanoe	Cortland Maplewood	
2013	Cincinnati St Xavier	Defiance	McDonald	
2012	Cincinnati St Xavier	Woodridge	Attica Seneca East	
2011	Dublin Coffman	Springfield Shawnee	McDonald	
2010	Louisville	Woodridge	Independence	
2009	Cleveland St. Ignatius	Woodridge	Independence	
2008	William Mason	Woodridge	Bellaire St. John Central	
2007	Medina	Woodridge	Louisville St Thomas Aquinas	
2006	Cincinnati La Salle	Woodridge	Louisville St Thomas Aquinas	
2005	Cincinnati La Salle	Salem	Cortland Maplewood	
2004	Middletown	Salem	McDonald	
2003	Cincinnati St Xavier	Ashtabula Edgewood	Cortland Maplewood	
2002	Hilliard Davidson	Cuyahoga Falls Walsh Jesuit	Cortland Maplewood	
2001	Hudson	Eaton	McDonald	
2000	Cincinnati St Xavier	Napoleon	Girard	
1999	Brunswick	Youngstown Cardinal Mooney	McDonald	
1998	Cincinnati St Xavier	Girard	East Canton	
1997	Pickerington	Field	Cortland Maplewood	
1996	Clayton Northmont	Kettering Archbishop Alter	Fort Recovery	
1995	Clayton Northmont	Bryan	Anna	
1994	Cleveland St. Ignatius	Field	Anna	
1993	Cleveland St. Ignatius	Salem	New London	
1992	Sylvania Southview	Bay Village Bay	Caldwell	
1991	Sylvania Southview	Bay Village Bay	Caldwell	
1990	Lancaster	Ashtabula Edgewood	Caldwell	
1989	Cincinnati Elder	Perkins	Caldwell	
1988	Cincinnati Elder	Perkins	Caldwell	
1987	Sylvania Southview	Perkins	Caldwell	
1986	Cincinnati Elder	Cincinnati Greenhills	Caldwell	
1985	Mentor	Bellevue	Caldwell	
1984	Cuyahoga Falls Walsh Jesuit	Bellevue	Miamisburg Dayton Christian	
1983	West Chester Lakota	Kenston	McDonald	
1982	Cincinnati Elder	Oberlin Firelands	McDonald	
1981	Kent Roosevelt	Louisville St. Thomas Aquinas	Lafayette Allen East	
1980	Kent Roosevelt	Louisville St. Thomas Aquinas	Sidney Lehman Catholic	
1979	Lancaster	Shelby	West Liberty-Salem	
1978	Cincinnati Colerain	Elyria Catholic	West Liberty-Salem	
1977	Amherst Steele	Elyria Catholic	West Liberty-Salem	
1976	Bay Village Bay	Louisville St. Thomas Aquinas	West Liberty-Salem	
1975	Austintown-Fitch	Liberty	Defiance Ayersville	
1974	Findlay	Elyria Catholic	Plymouth	
1973	Cincinnati Elder	Elyria Catholic	Caldwell	
1972	Austintown-Fitch	Chardon	Cortland Maplewood	
1971	Austintown-Fitch	Chagrin Falls	Plymouth	
1970	Toledo DeVilbiss	Kansas Lakota	Kent State High	
1969	Cleveland St Joseph	Georgetown		
1968	Cleveland St Joseph	Cortland Lakeview		
1967	Worthington	Cortland Lakeview		
1966	Cleveland St Joseph	Caledonia River Valley		
1965	Cleveland St Joseph			
1964	Cleveland John Marshall			
1963	Cleveland John Adams			
1962	Amherst Steele			
1961	Akron Buchtel			
1960	Cleveland John Marshall			
1959	Cleveland John Adams			
1958	Akron North			
1957	Cleveland West Technical			
1956	Cleveland East			
1955	Akron Buchtel & Columbus East *			
1954	Cleveland John Adams			
1953	Lakewood			
1952	Marion Harding			
1951	Cleveland West Technical			
1950	Cleveland West			
1949	Cincinnati Central			
1948	Cleveland West Technical			
1947	Akron North			
1946	Akron North			
1945	Cleveland West Technical			
1944	Cincinnati Western Hills			
1943	Akron North			
1942	No Tournament-WWII			
1941	Akron North			
1940	Springfield			
1939	Akron South			
1938	Springfield			
1937	Akron East			
1936	Toledo Scott			
1935	Toledo Scott			
1934	Toledo Scott			
1933	Akron East			
1932	Lakewood			
1931	Salem			
1930	Salem			
1929	Lakewood			
1928	Lakewood			

* Tie

== Girls' cross-country champions ==
Year	Girls D I / AAA	Girls D II / AA / AA-A	Girls D III / A	Girls D IV
2026	Milford	Aurora	Oakwood	Liberty Center
2025	Gahanna Lincoln	Columbus Bishop Watterson	Oakwood	Ottawa Hills
2024	Lancaster	Minerva	Minster	
2023	Perrysburg	Minerva	Minster	
2022	William Mason	Granville	Minster	
2021	Perrysburg	Minerva	Minster	
2020	Centerville	Lexington	West Liberty-Salem	
2019	Beavercreek	Lexington	Minster	
2018	Beavercreek	Lexington	Minster	
2017	Centerville	Lexington	Minster	
2016	Centerville	Woodridge	Minster	
2015	Centerville	Lexington	Louisville St. Thomas Aquinas	
2014	Centerville	Granville	McDonald	
2013	William Mason	Akron St. Vincent-St. Mary	Liberty Center	
2012	William Mason	Akron St. Vincent-St. Mary	Liberty Center	
2011	Brunswick	Akron St. Vincent-St. Mary	Liberty Center	
2010	Rocky River Magnificat	Akron St. Vincent-St. Mary	Minster	
2009	Rocky River Magnificat	Akron St. Vincent-St. Mary	Minster	
2008	Rocky River Magnificat	Cuyahoga Valley Christian Academy	Minster	
2007	Brecksville-Broadview Heights	Kettering Archbishop Alter	Versailles	
2006	Cincinnati St Ursula Academy	Salem	Gates Mills Gilmour Academy	
2005	Bowling Green	Salem	Minster	
2004	Bowling Green	North Bend Taylor	Minster	
2003	Bowling Green	Napoleon	Versailles	
2002	Hilliard Davidson	North Bend Taylor	Fort Loramie	
2001	Cincinnati Turpin	Cleveland Heights Beaumont School	Minster	
2000	Cincinnati Colerain	Cleveland Heights Beaumont School	Minster	
1999	Cincinnati Colerain	Cleveland Heights Beaumont School	Minster	
1998	Cincinnati Colerain	Field	Attica Seneca East	
1997	Cincinnati Colerain	Field	Barnesville	
1996	Beavercreek	Cleveland Heights Beaumont School	Findlay Liberty-Benton	
1995	Rocky River Magnificat	Cleveland Heights Beaumont School	Woodridge	
1994	Sylvania Southview	Cleveland Heights Beaumont School	Elmore Woodmore	
1993	Cleveland Heights Beaumont School	Elmore Woodmore		
1992	Worthington Thomas Worthington	Elmore Woodmore		
1991	Amherst Steele	Chagrin Falls		
1990	Upper Arlington	Sandusky St Mary Central Catholic		
1989	Worthington Thomas Worthington	Sandusky St Mary Central Catholic		
1988	GlenOak	Avon Lake	Sandusky St Mary Central Catholic	
1987	Bellevue	Olmsted Falls	Sandusky St Mary Central Catholic	
1986	Upper Arlington	Avon Lake	Findlay Liberty-Benton	
1985	Upper Arlington	Southeast	Findlay Liberty-Benton	
1984	West Chester Lakota	Southeast	Findlay Liberty-Benton	
1983	Lima Shawnee	Southeast	Zanesville Bishop Rosecrans	
1982	Upper Arlington	Lewis Center Olentangy	Minster	
1981	Upper Arlington	Olmsted Falls		
1980	Wadsworth	Olmsted Falls		
1979	Wadsworth	Chardon		
1978	Upper Arlington	Chardon		

== See also ==
- List of Ohio High School Athletic Association championships
- List of high schools in Ohio
- Ohio High School Athletic Conferences
- Ohio High School Athletic Association
