= Midwest Athletic Conference =

Athletic league in Ohio, US

The Midwest Athletic Conference is an Ohio High School Athletic Association (OHSAA) athletic league located in Northwest Ohio that was formed in 1972.

== Current members ==
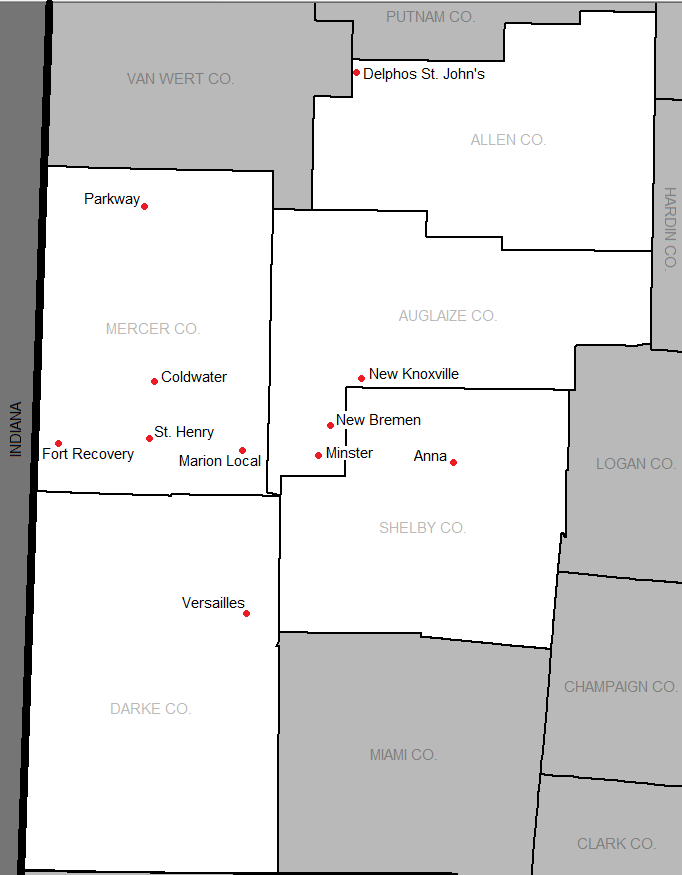
The member schools of the MAC since 2006.

School	Nickname	Location	Colors	Football Region	Basketball Division	Gym (Capacity)	Football Stadium	Joined League
Anna	Rockets	Anna	Green, White	6:24	VI (plays in SCAL)	The Launchpad	Booster Field	2006 (football-only), primarily in the SCAL
Coldwater	Cavaliers	Coldwater	Orange, Black	5:18	V	The Palace	Cavalier Stadium	1972
Delphos St. John's	Blue Jays	Delphos	Royal Blue, Gold	7:26	VII	The Vatican / Robert A. Arnzen Gymnasium	Stadium Park	1982
Fort Recovery	Indians	Fort Recovery	Purple, White	7:28	VII (VI in GBB)	Fort Site Fieldhouse	Barrenbrugge Athletic Park	1978
Marion Local	Flyers	Maria Stein	Blue, Gold	7:28	VII (VI in GBB)	The Hangar	Booster Stadium	1972
Minster	Wildcats	Minster	Orange, Black	7:28	VII (VI in GBB)	Wildcat Gym	Minster Memorial Field	1972
New Bremen	Cardinals	New Bremen	Cardinal, Gold	7:28	VII (VI in GBB)	The Nest	Cardinal Stadium	1972
New Knoxville	Rangers	New Knoxville	Red, Gray	N/A	VII	The Barn	N/A	1978 (no football)
Parkway	Panthers	Rockford	Black, Vegas Gold	6:22	VI	Panther Gym	Panther Stadium	1972
St. Henry	Redskins	St. Henry	Red, White	6:24	VI	Redskin Gym	Wally Post Athletic Complex	1972
Versailles	Tigers	Versailles	Orange, Black	6:24	V	The Jungle	H.B. Hole Field	2001

== Former members ==
School	Nickname	Location	Colors	Tenure	Current Conference
Ansonia	Tigers	Ansonia	Orange, Black	1972-1978	Western Ohio Athletic Conference
Bradford	Railroaders	Bradford	Orange, Black	1972-1978	Western Ohio Athletic Conference
Mendon-Union	Pirates	Mendon	Blue, Gold	1977-1992	Merged into Parkway in 1992

== MAC Rivalries ==
- Coldwater/St. Henry
- New Bremen/Minster
- Fort Recovery/St. Henry
- Marion Local/St. Henry
- New Bremen/New Knoxville
- Coldwater/Delphos St. John's
- Coldwater/Marion Local
- Fort Recovery/Parkway
- Marion Local/Versailles

== Non-Conference Rivalries ==
- Delphos St. John's/Lima Central Catholic
- Parkway/Crestview
- Coldwater/Celina
- Minster/Anna
- Versailles/Russia
- Minster/Fort Loramie
- Anna/Lehman Catholic
- New Knoxville/Botkins

== Sports fielded ==
School	Football	Volleyball	Cross Country		Golf		Basketball		Swimming		Bowling		Wrestling	Baseball	Softball	Track & Field		Soccer		Total
School	Football	Volleyball	Boys	Girls	Boys	Girls	Boys	Girls	Boys	Girls	Boys	Girls	Wrestling	Baseball	Softball	Boys	Girls	Boys	Girls	Total
Anna	X mark																			1
Coldwater	X mark	X mark	X mark	X mark	X mark	X mark	X mark	X mark	X mark	X mark	X mark	X mark	X mark	X mark	X mark	X mark	X mark		X mark	18
Delphos St. John's	X mark	X mark	X mark	X mark	X mark	X mark	X mark	X mark					X mark	X mark		X mark	X mark		X mark	12
Fort Recovery	X mark	X mark	X mark	X mark	X mark	X mark	X mark	X mark	X mark	X mark	X mark	X mark		X mark	X mark	X mark	X mark			16
Marion Local	X mark	X mark	X mark	X mark	X mark	X mark	X mark	X mark	X mark	X mark	X mark	X mark		X mark	X mark	X mark	X mark			16
Minster	X mark	X mark	X mark	X mark	X mark	X mark	X mark	X mark	X mark	X mark	X mark	X mark		X mark	X mark	X mark	X mark			16
New Bremen	X mark	X mark	X mark	X mark	X mark	X mark	X mark	X mark	X mark	X mark	X mark	X mark		X mark	X mark	X mark	X mark			16
New Knoxville		X mark	X mark	X mark	X mark	X mark	X mark	X mark						X mark		X mark	X mark	X mark		11
Parkway	X mark	X mark	X mark	X mark	X mark	X mark	X mark	X mark			X mark	X mark	X mark	X mark	X mark	X mark	X mark			15
St. Henry	X mark	X mark	X mark	X mark	X mark	X mark	X mark	X mark	X mark	X mark	X mark	X mark		X mark	X mark	X mark	X mark			16
Versailles	X mark	X mark	X mark	X mark	X mark	X mark	X mark	X mark	X mark	X mark	X mark	X mark	X mark	X mark	X mark	X mark	X mark			17

== Football Championships ==
=== By Year ===
Year	Champions
1973	Parkway
1974	Parkway; Marion Local
1975	Minster; Parkway; Coldwater
1976	Coldwater
1977	Coldwater; St. Henry
1978	Marion Local
1979	Marion Local
1980	Coldwater
1981	Marion Local
1982	Coldwater
1983	Coldwater
1984	Coldwater
1985	Marion Local; Coldwater
1986	St. Henry; Coldwater
1987	Minster; Coldwater
1988	New Bremen; Minster
1989	St. Henry; Delphos St. John's; Minster
1990	St. Henry
1991	Delphos St. John's
1992	St. Henry
1993	St. Henry
1994	Delphos St. John's
1995	St. Henry
1996	St. Henry
1997	Delphos St. John's
1998	Delphos St. John's
1999	Delphos St. John's
2000	Delphos St. John's
2001	Marion Local; Coldwater
2002	Coldwater
2003	Versailles
2004	Coldwater
2005	Coldwater
2006	Coldwater
2007	Marion Local
2008	Coldwater
2009	Delphos St. John's
2010	Delphos St. John's
2011	Marion Local; Delphos St. John's
2012	Coldwater
2013	Marion Local
2014	Marion Local
2015	Coldwater; Fort Recovery
2016	Coldwater; Marion Local
2017	Marion Local
2018	Marion Local; Anna
2019	Marion Local; Anna
2020	Coldwater; Marion Local
2021	Marion Local; Versailles
2022	Marion Local
2023	Marion Local
2024	Marion Local
2025	Marion Local

== State championships ==
Since the inception of the conference in 1973, the 10 member teams have been crowned state champions 156 times. All 10 MAC members have all won a team state title. The MAC has a total of 74 total state championships in boys sports (44 in football) and 76 girls team state championships. Members of the conference won 20 additional state championships before the MAC was established or before schools became members of the MAC.

School	Football	Volleyball	Cross Country		Golf		Basketball		Bowling		Wrestling	Baseball	Softball	Track & Field	
School	Football	Volleyball	Boys	Girls	Boys	Girls	Boys	Girls	Boys	Girls	Wrestling	Baseball	Softball	Boys	Girls
Anna	19	06	95, 94					13, 11, 81						80, 72	17
Coldwater	24, 20, 15, 14, 13, 12, 07, 05	24						92, 90	20, 15, 12, 07	21, 17, 15, 13, 12		19, 14, 92, 90, 87, 84, 83			25, 96, 95, 94
Delphos St. John's	10, 08, 05, 99, 98, 97						26, 02, 83, 49	02, 87, 80, 79, 77							
Fort Recovery	15	90	96				71	91, 90							
Marion Local	24, 23, 22, 21, 19, 17, 16, 14, 13, 12, 11, 07, 06, 01, 00	13, 12, 09, 08, 07					18, 03, 75	03						24, 23	
Minster	17, 14, 89			21, 19, 18, 17, 16, 10, 09, 08, 05, 04, 01, 00, 99, 82	09			19, 18, 04, 98				11, 12, 17		21	18, 04, 03, 02, 01, 89, 85, 82, 80, 79, 78, 77, 76
New Bremen	22, 20	23, 22, 19, 17													
New Knoxville		21					08								
Parkway		97, 96										91, 87			
St. Henry	25, 06, 04, 95, 94, 92, 90	11, 04, 95, 94, 90, 87, 85					04, 91, 90, 79	26	26					03, 00, 99	
Versailles	21, 03, 98, 95, 94, 93, 90	18, 17, 13		07, 03				15, 08				65			13, 12, 10

== See also ==
- Ohio High School Athletic Conferences
