= WRKD =

WRKD may refer to:

- WRKD-LP, a low-power radio station (101.3 FM) licensed to serve Rockford, Ohio, United States
- WVOM (AM), a defunct radio station (1450 AM) formerly licensed to serve Rockland, Maine, United States, which held the call sign WRKD until 2013
