= St. Henry, Ohio =

- Village
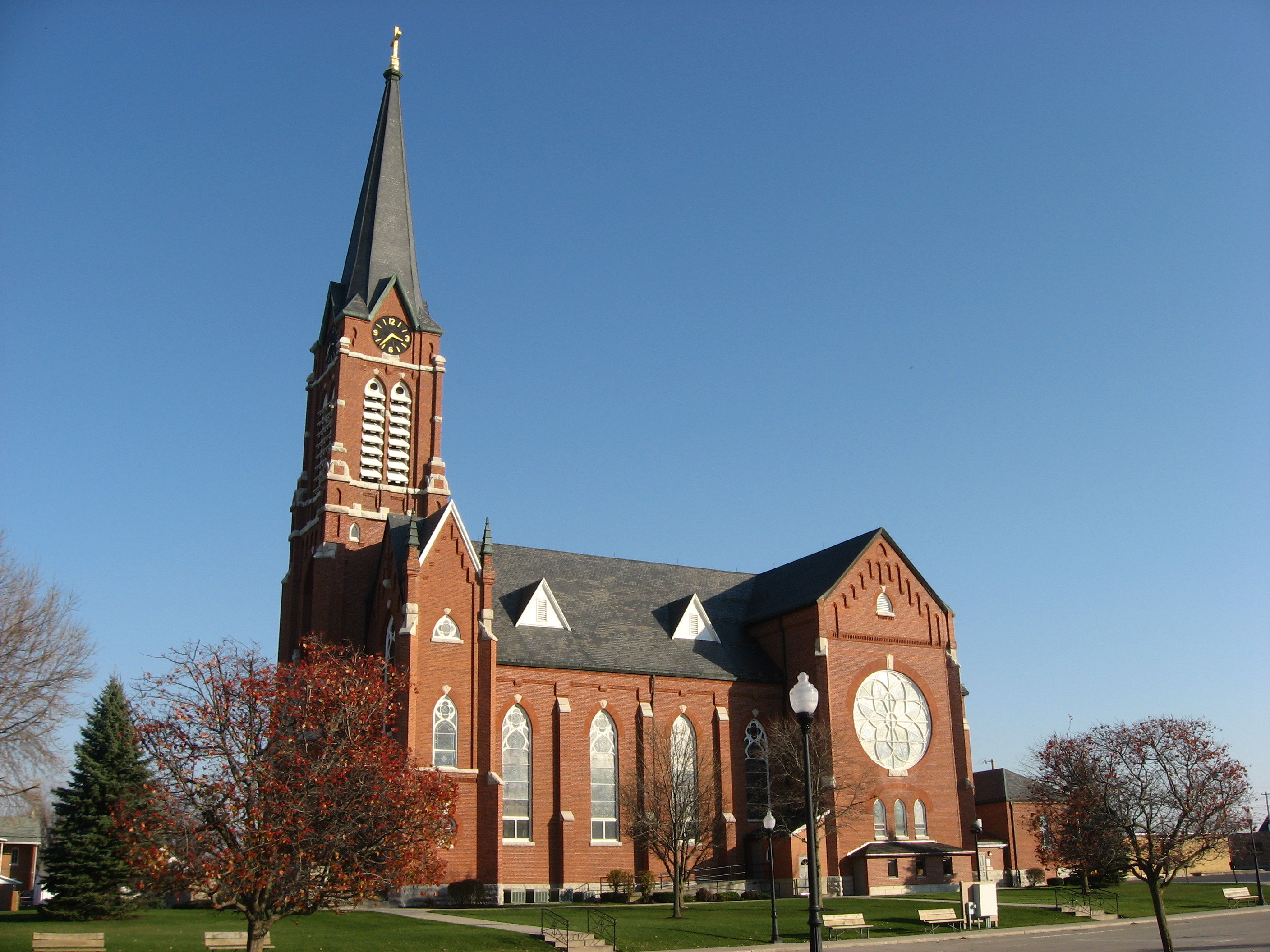
- St. Henry Catholic Church

- Location in Mercer County and the state of Ohio.
- Coordinates: 40°25′23″N 84°37′30″W
- Country: United States
- State: Ohio
- County: Mercer
- Township: Granville

Area
  - Total: 1.77 sq mi (4.59 km^{2})
  - Land: 1.73 sq mi (4.47 km^{2})
  - Water: 0.046 sq mi (0.12 km^{2})
- Elevation: 955 ft (291 m)

Population (2020)
  - Total: 2,596
  - Density: 1,504.9/sq mi (581.06/km^{2})
- Time zone: UTC-5 (Eastern (EST))
  - Summer (DST): UTC-4 (EDT)
- Postal code: 45883
- Area code: 419
- FIPS code: 39-69540
- GNIS feature ID: 2399173

St. Henry or Saint Henry is a village in Mercer County, Ohio, United States. The population was 2,596 at the 2020 census.

== History ==
St. Henry was laid out in 1837 by Johann Heinrich Römer (1805–1874). It laid in a tract of land sold to him by his brother Franz on July 7, 1837. The tract was surveyed on July 7, the town was platted on July 13, and the plat was recorded on July 15. July 13 is the feast of St. Henry. At the center of the village is St. Henry's Catholic Church. Completed in 1897, the church is listed on the National Register of Historic Places. A post office has been in operation at St. Henry since 1850. The village was incorporated in 1901.

== Geography ==
According to the United States Census Bureau, the village has a total area of 1.65 square miles (4.27 km^{2}), of which 1.60 square miles (4.14 km^{2}) is land and 0.05 square miles (0.13 km^{2}) is water.

== Demographics ==
Historical population
| Census | Pop. | Note | %± |
|---|---|---|---|
| 1880 | 4 | | — |
| 1890 | 21 | | 425.0% |
| 1900 | 82 | | 290.5% |
| 1910 | 145 | | 76.8% |
| 1920 | 304 | | 109.7% |
| 1930 | 421 | | 38.5% |
| 1940 | 514 | | 22.1% |
| 1950 | 612 | | 19.1% |
| 1960 | 711 | | 16.2% |
| 1970 | 841 | | 18.3% |
| 1980 | 1,096 | | 30.3% |
| 1990 | 1,325 | | 20.9% |
| 2000 | 1,804 | | 36.2% |
| 2010 | 2,427 | | 34.5% |
| 2020 | 2,596 | | 7.0% |
U.S. Decennial Census

Religion in St. Henry
| religion | percent |
| Catholic | 96.5% |
| Protestant | 1.8% |
| No Religion | 1.4% |
| "Unspecified" | .3% |

According to the Census Bureau, as of 2015 the median income for a household in the village was $80,000, and the median income for a family was $90,870. Males had a median income of $40,911 versus $27,102 for females. The per capita income for the village was $28,932. About 0.9% of families and 2.8% of the population were below the poverty line, including 2.0% of those under age 18 and 7.6% of those age 65 or over.

=== 2010 census ===
As of the census of 2010, there were 2,427 people, 862 households, and 646 families residing in the village. The population density was 1,516.9 inhabitants per square mile (585.7/km^{2}). There were 892 housing units at an average density of 557.5 per square mile (215.3/km^{2}). The racial makeup of the village was 99.1% White, 0.1% African American, 0.6% from other races, and 0.2% from two or more races. Hispanic or Latino of any race were 1.4% of the population.

There were 862 households, of which 36.5% had children under the age of 18 living with them, 67.3% were married couples living together, 5.2% had a female householder with no husband present, 2.4% had a male householder with no wife present, and 25.1% were non-families. 22.4% of all households were made up of individuals, and 12.6% had someone living alone who was 65 years of age or older. The average household size was 2.79 and the average family size was 3.33.

The median age in the village was 35.2 years. 29.5% of residents were under the age of 18; 8.3% were between the ages of 18 and 24; 22.6% were from 25 to 44; 23.8% were from 45 to 64; and 15.7% were 65 years of age or older. The gender makeup of the village was 50.0% male and 50.0% female.

== Education ==
St. Henry contains one public high school, St. Henry High School. The St. Henry Redskins Football team has won state titles in 1990, 1992, 1994, 1995, 2004, 2006 and 2025 with two 2nd-place finishes in 1996 and 1999. St. Henry High School is part of the Midwest Athletic Conference.

St. Henry High School also holds seven girls volleyball state championships (2011, 2004, 1995, 1994, 1990, 1987, 1985),, one girls basketball state championship (2026), four boys basketball state championships (1979, 1990, 1991, 2004), and three baseball state championships (1999, 2000, 2003).

St. Henry has a public library, a branch of the Mercer County District Library.

== Notable people ==
- Jeff Hartings, center in the National Football League
- Bobby Hoying, quarterback in the National Football League
- Jim Lachey, offensive tackle in the National Football League
- Wally Post, right fielder in Major League Baseball

== See also ==
- Burkettsville
- Carthagena
- Coldwater
- Cranberry Prairie
