= James Elliott Moore II =

American academic and professor (born 1958)

James Elliot Moore II
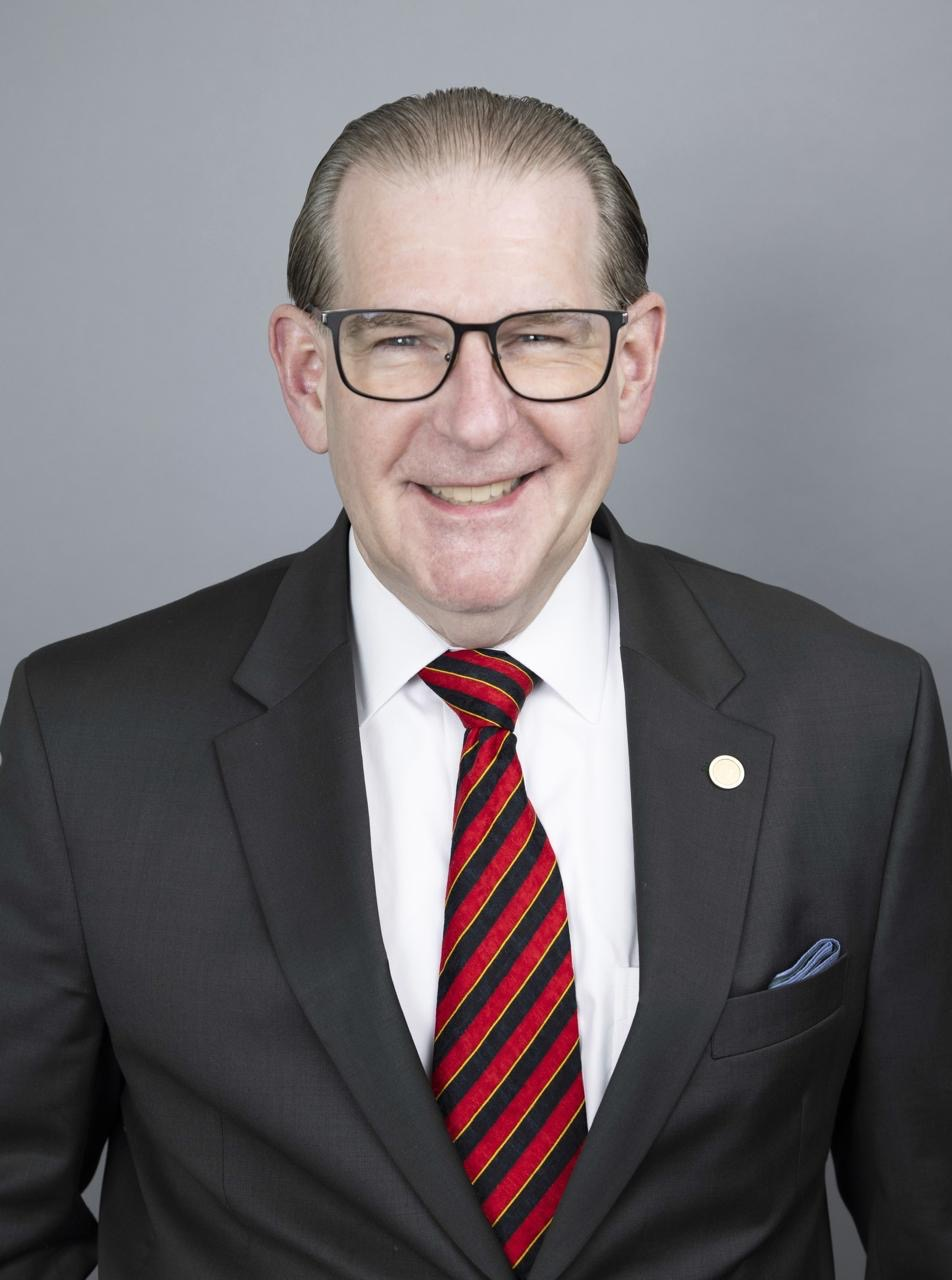
- Born: September 15, 1958 (age 68); Newport, Rhode Island, United States
- Education: Northwestern University; Stanford University
- Awards: Kapitsa Gold Medal of Honor from the United States Section of the Russian Academy of Natural Sciences; Senior Fellow of the Reason Foundation; Fellow of the Institute of Industrial and Systems Engineers
- Scientific career
- Fields: Economic impact analysis; Transport engineering; Infrastructure systems; Public policy
- Workplaces: University of Southern California; Northwestern University

James Elliott Moore II (born September 15, 1958) is an American academic and professor emeritus of Industrial and Systems Engineering known for his work in economic impact analysis, transportation engineering, infrastructure systems, and public policy. He has held faculty appointments at the University of Southern California (USC) in the Viterbi School of Engineering and the Sol Price School of Public Policy.

He is a Senior Fellow at the Reason Foundation since 2024. He served as national board president of the Institute of Industrial and Systems Engineers from 2015-2016 and president of the Institute for Operations Research and Management Sciences' Transportation Science and Logistics Society during 2009.

Moore received the Kapitsa Gold Medal of Honor from the United States Section of the Russian Academy of Natural Sciences in 2004.

== Early life and education ==
Moore was born in Newport, Rhode Island, and raised in New Bremen, Ohio along with two younger sisters. His youngest sister, Elizabeth Moore, is executive vice president of Breitbart News.

He earned a diploma from New Bremen High School in 1976. He completed a Bachelor of Science in Industrial Engineering and a Bachelor of Science in Urban and Regional Planning, both with distinction, from Northwestern University in 1981. He later earned a Master of Science in Industrial Engineering from Stanford University (1982), a Master of Urban and Regional Planning from Northwestern (1983), and a PhD in Civil Engineering with a specialization in Infrastructure Planning and Management from Stanford (1986).

== Career ==
=== Academic career ===
Before joining the University of Southern California, he was a faculty member at Northwestern University's Technological Institute, now the McCormick School of Engineering and Applied Science.

Moore joined USC in 1988 and received tenure in 1993 at the School of Urban and Regional Planning, now the Sol Price School of Public Policy. Concerned by an ongoing loss of scientific rigor and economic thinking in the urban planning literature, he began to focus more on his secondary appointment in USC's School of Engineering. In 1998, he changed his primary appointment to the Viterbi School of Engineering's Astani Department of Civil and Environmental Engineering, where he received tenure while retaining a secondary appointment in the School of Urban Planning and Development. In 2003, Moore applied for and received tenure at the Epstein Department of Industrial and Systems Engineering, retaining secondary appointments in public policy and civil engineering.

He was appointed chair of the Epstein Department in 2004, serving until 2010. He was appointed Viterbi School of Engineering vice Dean for academic programs in 2011, serving until removed by the Dean in 2017.

In 1998, Moore took a sabbatical to work with the California Research Bureau and USC's external affairs office in Sacramento, collaborating with former Santa Clara County supervisor Rod Diridon to draft a budget trailer bill for the California legislature that required federally funded university transportation research centers to automatically receive any and all required matching funds from the state, which was signed into law by Governor Pete Wilson in 1999 and played a key role in establishing METRANS as a transportation research institute in Los Angeles.

He founded and directed the transportation engineering program at USC, an interdisciplinary initiative that spanned across multiple departments. He served in several administrative capacities, including 26 years as faculty in residence at the USC Honors House, department chair, vice dean for academic programs, and four terms as president of the engineering faculty at USC.

Moore's tenure at USC was marked by his libertarian views, which often led him to critique progressive political agendas within academia. He believed that certain progressive policies conflicted with his libertarian principles. His opposition to specific administrative decisions, such as the suspension of employer contributions to faculty retirement accounts during the COVID-19 pandemic, contributed to a more contentious relationship with USC leadership.

Moore was removed from the Viterbi School dean's office in 2017 over his opposition to the university's changes to Title IX rules and the engineering school's growing embrace of diversity, equity, and inclusion initiatives, which Moore contended were being implemented in ways that violated Titles VI and VII of the Civil Rights Act of 1964 and the equal protection clause of the U.S. Constitution. The dean of the Viterbi School broke with standard procedure and forbade a departmental faculty vote on whether Moore should return to the role of Epstein Department chair. In 2018, during the Senate confirmation hearings for Supreme Court Associate Justice Brett Kavanaugh, Moore's public support for due process in response to allegations of sexual misconduct resulted in student protests calling for Moore's removal from the faculty.

Near the end of his faculty career, Moore concluded that public policy making was driven almost entirely by political motives, and mostly unaffected by analyses intended to inform decision makers. His proposals for government research funding could only lead to work products that would have little or no impact, and overhead payment that the institution would dedicate to the growth of an administration that was becoming increasingly misguided and parasitic.

In 2022, after 36 years of full-time service, Moore retired from USC and was designated professor emeritus.

He later revealed that, as a result of Moore's political views, the prospect of withholding this emeritus designation had been the subject of high-level meetings at USC involving the president, provost, his deans, and the general counsel.

He remains critical of the direction that USC and other educational institutions have taken regarding issues of social justice and systemic racism and encouraged by the reforms initiated by the second Trump administration.

=== Post-retirement ===
Moore retains the title of professor emeritus at the University of Southern California following his retirement. He was subsequently invited to teach a graduate course, but the appointment was later withdrawn by the university administration. Moore has publicly discussed the circumstances surrounding this decision and its broader context. He continues to maintain professional ties with the academic community in his capacity as an emeritus professor.

After retirement, Moore has remained active in public discussion on university governance and higher-education policy. In interviews and public statements, he has indicated an intention to work with colleagues to establish or support organizations promoting viewpoint diversity in academia, including initiatives associated with Heterodox Academy.

In public posts, Moore has described the principal personal drawback of retirement as the loss of regular interaction with students, emphasizing the importance he placed on teaching and mentorship. He has stated that he continues to engage in research, writing, and public commentary outside formal faculty duties.

==== Legal complaint against USC ====
In September 2025, Moore circulated a formal complaint alleging viewpoint discrimination in faculty governance at the University of Southern California. The complaint challenges the Academic Senate's March 2025 adoption of Bylaw 11.1, which bars resigned or retired faculty from serving as officers or Executive Board members.Although Moore, who retired in 2022, received sufficient votes in the Spring 2025 election for an at-large Executive Board seat, he was declared ineligible under the new provision. He argues that Bylaw 11.1 conflicts with the Senate constitution, which includes retired faculty among eligible Faculty Assembly participants, and contends that constitutional provisions supersede conflicting bylaws.

Moore further alleges that his exclusion reflects ideological bias, asserting that the Senate leadership is predominantly politically progressive and resistant to his libertarian and conservative views. He has sought review by the U.S. Department of Education, requesting an investigation into potential violations of federal protections related to free inquiry and viewpoint neutrality and urging recognition of the Spring 2025 election results. A petition he submitted to the American Association of University Professors Committee on College and University Governance was declined on jurisdictional grounds, and he has indicated that he is proceeding within the applicable 180-day filing period.

== Research ==
Moore's funded research focuses on transportation networks, infrastructure risk management, and regional economic modeling. His work in transportation systems involves the analysis of network performance, congestion pricing, and the economic impacts of transit and transportation projects policies. Additionally, Moore's research in disaster resilience assesses risks to infrastructure from natural hazards such as earthquakes, tsunamis, and terrorist attacks.

A central theme of Moore's research is the development and application of integrated economic–transportation models. A key example is the TransNIEMO model, which combines a multiregional economic input-output model of the U.S. with a national freight and highway network to study how disruptions (e.g., choke-point closures) propagate through commodity flows and affect regional economies. By simulating disruptions and re-routing freight, this approach helps quantify economic impacts and network resilience at a state and national level.

Moore also explores risk and resilience of infrastructure systems particularly transportation networks under hazards such as earthquakes, seismic events, and other unexpected events. His work with collaborators examines how damage to highway bridges and transportation links affects network performance, post-disaster travel demand, and overall economic outcomes. This includes statistical risk assessment and engineering economic modeling to estimate transportation system vulnerability and the efficiency of mitigation strategies.

In addition to model development, Moore's research assesses policy interventions and their broader socioeconomic effects. He investigates how pricing strategies, control policies, and regional planning decisions influence transportation performance and access. His work on disruptions at major transportation hubs such as the shutdown of the Los Angeles-Long Beach ports bridges transport modeling with trade and economic analysis, highlighting the importance of contingency planning and adaptive responses in large metropolitan regions.

Moore's funded research projects also explore the environmental and economic impacts of transportation practices, the adoption of new technologies (e.g., Positive Train Control), and educational programs that integrate engineering and policy evaluation. His research is often collaborative, bringing together industrial engineering, civil engineering, and planning disciplines to address complex infrastructure systems.

== Selected publications ==
=== Journals ===
- Moore, James E.; Gordon, Peter (1990). "A sequential programming model of urban land development". Socio-Economic Planning Sciences. 24 (3): 199–216. doi:10.1016/0038-0121(90)90003-p. ISSN 0038-0121.
- Moore, James E. II; Gordon, Peter; Cho, Sungbin; Richardson, Harry W.; Shinozuka, Masanobu; Chang, Stephanie (2001). "Integrating Transportation Network and Regional Economic Models to Estimate the Costs of a Large Urban Earthquake". Journal of Regional Science. 41 (1): 39–65. Bibcode:2001JRegS..41...39C. doi:10.1111/0022-4146.00206. ISSN 0022-4146.
- Moore, J.E.; Kalaba, R.E.; Fan, Y.Y. (2005). "Shortest paths in stochastic networks with correlated link costs". Computers & Mathematics with Applications. 49 (9–10): 1549–1564. doi:10.1016/j.camwa.2004.07.028. ISSN 0898-1221.
- Moore, James E. II; Rubin, Thomas A.; Lee, Shin (1999). "Ten myths about US urban rail systems". Transport Policy. 6 (1): 57–73. doi:10.1016/s0967-070x(98)00032-8. ISSN 0967-070X.
- Moore, James E. II; Gordon, Peter; Park, Jiyoung; Richardson, Harry W. (2008-11-12). "The State-by-State Economic Impacts of the 2002 Shutdown of the Los Angeles–Long Beach Ports". Growth and Change. 39 (4): 548–572. Bibcode:2008GroCh..39..548P. doi:10.1111/j.1468-2257.2008.00446.x. ISSN 0017-4815.
- Jun, Myung-jin; Moore, James E. (2002). "The Lowry Model Revisited: Incorporating a Multizonal Input-Output Model into an Urban Land Use Allocation Model". Review of Urban & Regional Development Studies. 14 (1): 2–17. doi:10.1111/1467-940X.00045. ISSN 1467-940X.
- Cho, Sungbin; Fan, Yue Yue; Moore, II, James E. (2003-07-24). "Modeling Transportation Network Flows as a Simultaneous Function of Travel Demand, Earthquake Damage, and Network Level Service". Advancing Mitigation Technologies and Disaster Response for Lifeline Systems. Reston, Va.: American Society of Civil Engineers. pp. 868–877. doi:10.1061/40687(2003)88. ISBN 978-0-7844-0687-8.
- Richardson, Harry W.; Pan, Qisheng; Park, JiYoung; Moore, James E. II, eds. (2015). Regional Economic Impacts of Terrorist Attacks, Natural Disasters and Metropolitan Policies. Advances in Spatial Science. doi:10.1007/978-3-319-14322-4. ISBN 978-3-319-14321-7.

=== Books ===
- Richardson, Harry W.; Park, Jiyoung; Moore, James E. II; Pan, Qisheng, eds. (2014-11-28). National Economic Impact Analysis of Terrorist Attacks and Natural Disasters. Edward Elgar Publishing. doi:10.4337/9781783475865. ISBN 978-1-78347-586-5.
- Richardson, Harry W.; Gordon, Peter; Moore, James E.; Park, Jiyoung; Pan, Qisheng; Kim, Soojung (2007-03-27). "Tourism and Terrorism: The National and Interregional Economic Impacts of Attacks on Major US Theme Parks". In Richardson, Harry W.; Gordon, Peter; Moore, James E. II (eds.). The Economic Costs and Consequences of Terrorism. Edward Elgar Publishing. ISBN 978-1-84720-550-6.
- Gordon, Peter; Moore, James E. II; Richardson, Harry W.; Pan, Qisheng (2005-12-20). "The Economic Impact of a Terrorist Attack on the Twin Ports of Los Angeles–Long Beach". In Richardson, Harry W.; Gordon, Peter; Moore, James E. II (eds.). The Economic Impacts of Terrorist Attacks. Edward Elgar Publishing. ISBN 978-1-84542-815-0.
- Park, Jiyoung; Gordon, Peter; Moore, James E.; Wang, Lanlan; Richardson, Harry W (2007-03-27). "Simulating the State-by-State Effects of Terrorist Attacks on Three Major US Ports: Applying NIEMO (National Interstate Economic Model)". In Richardson, Harry W.; Gordon, Peter; Moore, James E. II (eds.). The Economic Costs and Consequences of Terrorism. Edward Elgar Publishing. ISBN 978-1-84720-550-6.
