= Mendon-Union High School =

Coordinates: 40.672106°N 84.515608°W

Location
- S. Green St. at Jefferson St. Mendon, (Mercer County), Ohio 45862; United States

Information
- Type: Public, Coeducational high school
- Grades: 9-12
- Colors: Blue and Gold
- Athletics conference: Midwest Athletic Conference
- Team name: Pirates

Mendon-Union High School was a public school in Mercer County, Ohio that mainly served an area that included the village of Mendon and Union Township. The school and the district were closed following the 1991–92 school year in a budgetary move and they were merged with the neighboring Parkway School District for 1992–93. Parts of the district were also merged into St. Marys City Schools and Spencerville Local Schools.

The Mendon-Union Pirates wore blue and gold while competing in the Midwest Athletic Conference.

The Mendon-Union K-12 building was demolished in 2006 to help the Parkway School District focus on building a K-12 building on one campus.
