= Shelby County Athletic League =

The Shelby County Athletic League is an OHSAA athletic conference whose seven member schools are located in Shelby County, Ohio. containing the schools of Anna, Botkins, Fairlawn, Fort Loramie, Houston, Jackson Center, and Russia these school combined have 30 state wins making it a great athletic league with rich history being 100 years old in 2024

== Members ==
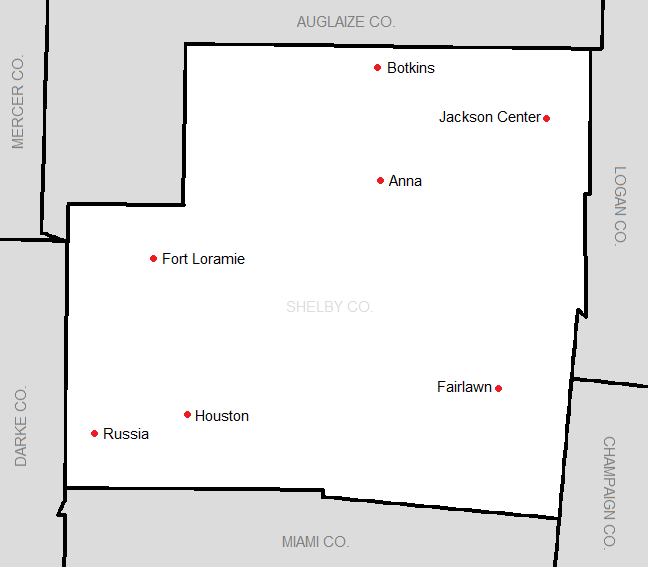

| School | Nickname | Location | Colors | Notes |
|---|---|---|---|---|
| Anna | Rockets | Anna | Green, White | Football participates in the Midwest Athletic Conference |
| Botkins | Trojans | Botkins | Black, Gold, White | |
| Fairlawn | Jets | Sidney | Blue, White | |
| Fort Loramie | Redskins | Fort Loramie | Red, Black | Football Participates in the Northwest Conference |
| Houston | Wildcats | Houston | Red, White | |
| Jackson Center | Tigers | Jackson Center | Orange, Black | |
| Russia | Raiders | Russia | Royal Blue, Gold | |

=== Former members ===
- Plattsville Green Township Griffins (pre-1940-51, consolidated into Fairlawn)
- McCartyville Mustangs (pre-1940-49, consolidated into Anna)
- Pemberton Perry Township Panthers (pre-1940-51, consolidated into Fairlawn)
