= Jordan Thompson (American football) =

American football player (born 1989)

No. 82
- Position: Tight end

Personal information
- Born: July 12, 1989 (age 37); Rockford, Ohio, U.S.
- Listed height: 6 ft 4 in (1.93 m)
- Listed weight: 257 lb (117 kg)

Career information
- High school: Parkway (Rockford)
- College: Ohio (2008–2012)
- NFL draft: 2013: undrafted

Career history
- Detroit Lions (2014–2015)

Awards and highlights
- Second-team All-MAC (2010)
- Stats at Pro Football Reference

Jordan Benjamin Thompson (born July 12, 1989) is an American former professional football tight end who played for the Detroit Lions of the National Football League (NFL). He played college football at Ohio University.

== Early life ==
Jordan Benjamin Thompson was born on July 12, 1989, in Rockford, Ohio. He played high school football at Parkway High School in Rockford as a quarterback, punter and linebacker. During his high school career, he totaled 307 completions on 515 passing attempts for 3,674 yards and 27 touchdowns, 432 carries for 1,693 yards and 23 touchdowns, 307 solo tackles, 169 assisted tackles, 13 sacks, five forced fumbles and four fumble recoveries. As a linebacker, Thompson earned first-team Division 5 All-Ohio recognition and Division 5 Defensive Player of the Year accolades, among other honors. He was also named first-team All-Mid West Athletic Conference as a punter and second-team as a quarterback.

== College career ==
Thompson was a four-year letterman for the Ohio Bobcats of Ohio University from 2009 to 2012. He was redshirted in 2008. He caught seven passes for 109 yards in 2009. Thompson recorded 21 receptions for 204 yards and three touchdowns during the 2010 season, garnering second-team All-Mid-American Conference (MAC) honors. In 2011, he caught 24 passes for 258 yards and a touchdown, earning honorable mention All-MAC accolades. He played in six games as a senior in 2012, totaling eight catches for 95 yards and one touchdown, before suffering a season-ending torn knee ligament. He majored in engineering at Ohio University.

== Professional career ==
Thompson was rated the 54th best tight end in the 2013 NFL draft by NFLDraftScout.com.

Pre-draft measurables
Height	Weight	Arm length	Hand span	Wingspan	40-yard dash	10-yard split	20-yard split	Bench press
6 ft 3 3/4 in (1.92 m)	247 lb (112 kg)	31 3/8 in (0.80 m)	9 1/4 in (0.23 m)	6 ft 5 in (1.96 m)	4.82 s	1.72 s	2.77 s	22 reps
All values from Ohio Pro Day

Thompson was signed by the Detroit Lions on April 28, 2014, a year after going undrafted. He was released by the Lions on August 30, 2014, and signed to the team's practice squad on September 1, 2014. He made his NFL debut on October 19, 2014, against the New Orleans Saints. He was released by the Lions on May 4, 2016.

He participated in The Spring League in 2017 and caught the first touchdown in league history from McLeod Bethel-Thompson.

== Life after football ==
Thompson later became a carpenter on the HGTV show, While You Were Out.
