= Fort Recovery High School =

Location
- 400 E. Butler Street; Fort Recovery, Ohio, (Mercer County), Ohio 45846; United States
- Coordinates: 40°24′43″N 84°46′27″W

Information
- Established: 1868
- School district: Fort Recovery School District
- Superintendent: Larry Brown
- Principal: Tony Stahl
- Teaching staff: 15.15 (FTE)
- Grades: 9–12
- Student to teacher ratio: 21.25
- Campus type: Rural
- Colors: Purple and White
- Fight song: On Wisconsin
- Athletics conference: Midwest Athletic Conference
- Mascot: Indians
- Rival: St. Henry High School; Jay County High School; Minster High School
- Website: http://www.fortrecoveryschools.org/

Fort Recovery High School is a public high school in the Fort Recovery School District, and is located in Fort Recovery, Ohio. Its nickname is the Indians. It is a member of the Midwest Athletic Conference.

== Varsity sports ==
Fall sports:

- American football D6
- Volleyball D3
- Boys' golf
- Girls' golf
- Boys' cross-country D3
- Girls' cross-country D3

Winter sports:

- Boys' basketball D4
- Girls' basketball D3
- Boys' swimming D2
- Girls' swimming D2

Spring sports:

- Baseball D4
- Softball D3
- Boys' track and field D3
- Girls' track and field D3

== Ohio High School Athletic Association state championships ==
- Boys' football- 2015
- Boys' basketball - 1971
- Girls' basketball - 1990,1991
- Girls' volleyball – 1990
- Boys' cross-country – 1996
