= Marion Local High School =

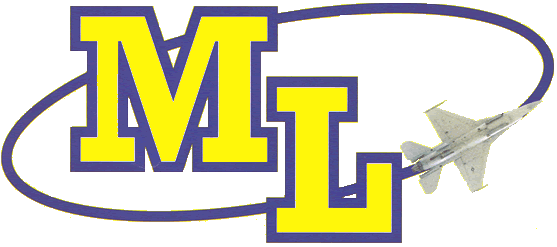

Location
- 1901 State Route 716; Maria Stein, Ohio 45860; United States; 40.40442°N 84.49355°W

Information
- Type: Public
- Motto: Every student. Every day. Whatever it takes.
- Established: 1922
- School district: Marion Local School District
- NCES School ID: 391003103298
- Principal: Tim Goodwin
- Teaching staff: 16.00 (FTE)
- Grades: 9–12
- Enrollment: 306 (2024–25)
- Student to teacher ratio: 17.19
- Color
- Fight song: Go, Go, You Marion Flyers
- Athletics conference: Midwest Athletic Conference
- Mascot: Freddie Flyer
- Nickname: Flyers
- Rival: Versailles, Coldwater, St. Henry
- Accreditation: Ohio Department of Education
- Newspaper: The Gold Standard
- Yearbook: The Flyer
- Website: marionlocal.org

Marion Local High School is a public high school located in Maria Stein, Ohio, United States. As of the 2024–25 school year, the school has 306 students enrolled. The students are from Maria Stein and several surrounding communities, including Cassella, Chickasaw, St. Rose and St. Sebastian in Mercer County, Osgood in Darke County, as well as a small portion of Auglaize County. These communities were served by a series of local one-room school houses that still stand in Chickasaw, Minster, St. Rose and St. Sebastian. In 1922 a two-year high school was established in Maria Stein and in 1930 a three-story brick school (named St. John's School) was completed directly across from St. John's Church. In 1955 the Marion Local Consolidated School District was established and charged with strengthening the educational opportunities for students in the six member communities. The Marion Local School District built a new high school, Marion Local High School, in Maria Stein in 1957.

== Athletics ==
Marion Local is a member of the Midwest Athletic Conference. They have captured more than 50 league championships in various MAC-sanctioned sports since 1973. Marion Local has the most playoff-era football state championships in the state of Ohio at 15.

=== State championships ===
- Boys basketball — 1975, 2003, 2018
- Girls basketball – 2003
- Football – 2000, 2001, 2006, 2007, 2011, 2012, 2013, 2014, 2016, 2017, 2019, 2021, 2022, 2023, 2024
- Boys track and field — 2023, 2024
- Girls volleyball — 2007, 2008, 2009, 2012, 2013

=== State runners-Up ===
- Boys basketball — 2004, 2024
- Girls basketball — 2000
- Football — 2003, 2015, 2018
- Girls track and field — 1989
- Girls volleyball — 2002

=== State Final Four ===
- Boys basketball — 1984
- Football — 1981, 1999, 2008, 2009
- Softball — 2004
- Girls volleyball — 2000

== Notable alumni ==
- Cory Luebke — professional baseball player in Major League Baseball
