= Jeff Hartings =

American football player (born 1972)

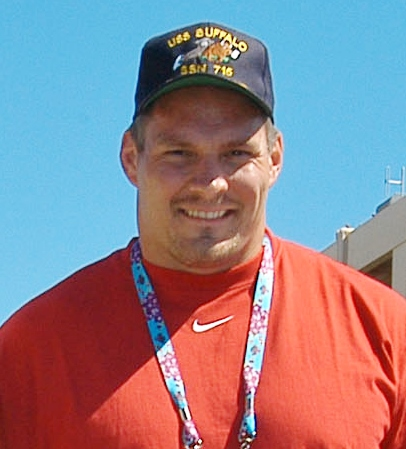
- Hartings on the USS Buffalo (SSN-715) before the 2005 Pro Bowl

No. 64
- Positions: Center, guard

Personal information
- Born: September 7, 1972 (age 54); St. Henry, Ohio, U.S.
- Listed height: 6 ft 3 in (1.91 m)
- Listed weight: 299 lb (136 kg)

Career information
- High school: St. Henry
- College: Penn State (1992–1995)
- NFL draft: 1996: 1st round, 23rd overall pick

Career history
- Detroit Lions (1996–2000); Pittsburgh Steelers (2001–2006)

Awards and highlights
- Super Bowl champion (XL); First-team All-Pro (2004); Second-team All-Pro (2001); 2× Pro Bowl (2004, 2005); PFWA All-Rookie Team (1996); 2× First-team All-American (1994, 1995); 2× First-team All-Big Ten (1994, 1995)

Career NFL statistics
- Games played: 162
- Games started: 160
- Touchdowns: 1
- Stats at Pro Football Reference

Jeffrey Alan Hartings (born September 7, 1972) is an American former professional football player who was a center for 11 seasons in the National Football League (NFL). He played college football for the Penn State Nittany Lions, earning All-American honors. A first-round pick of the Detroit Lions in the 1996 NFL draft, he played professionally for the Lions and Pittsburgh Steelers. He was a member of the Steelers' Super Bowl championship team in 2005, beating the Seattle Seahawks, and he was a two-time Pro Bowl selection. He is currently the head football coach at Worthington Christian High School.

== Early life ==
Hartings was born in St. Henry, Ohio. He attended St. Henry High School, and was a letterwinner in football as a two-way starter and in track and field. In football, he was a two-time all-conference selection, helped lead his team to the state championship as a senior, and compiled 23 sacks and 200 tackles. After his senior season, he participated in the Ohio North-South Game.

== Career ==
=== College career ===
Hartings attended Penn State University, where he played for coach Joe Paterno's Penn State Nittany Lions football team from 1992 to 1995. He was a first-team All-American in 1994 and 1995, garnering consensus first-team honors in 1995. He graduated from Penn State with a Bachelor of Science degree in marketing in 1995 and was twice honored as an Academic All-American.

=== Professional career ===
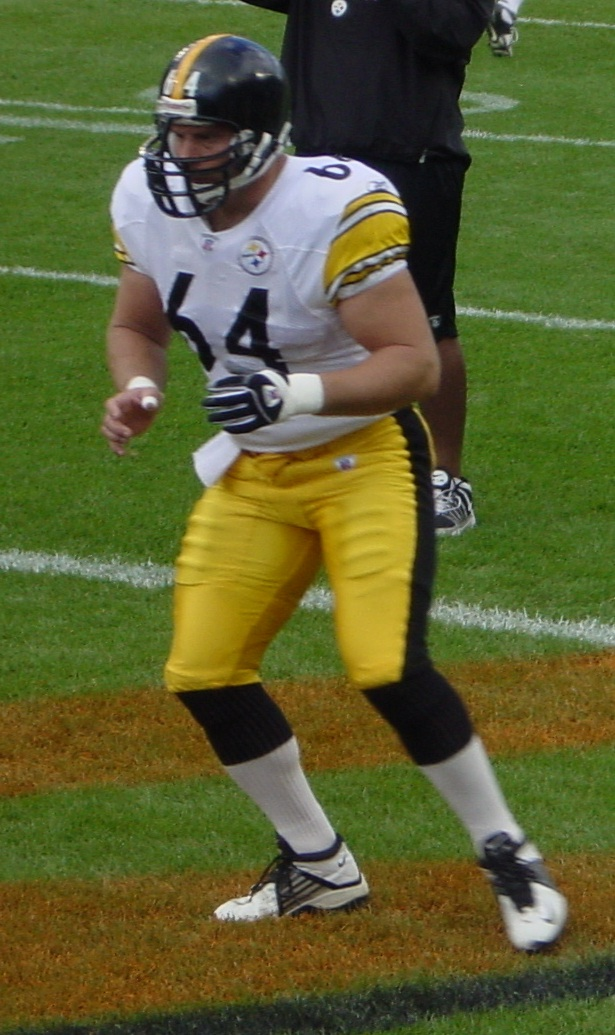
Hartings in 2002

Pre-draft measurables
Height	Weight	Arm length	Hand span	40-yard dash	10-yard split	20-yard split	20-yard shuttle	Vertical jump	Broad jump	Bench press
6 ft 3 in (1.91 m)	288 lb (131 kg)	32 in (0.81 m)	9 3/8 in (0.24 m)	5.15 s	1.75 s	2.95 s	4.30 s	26.0 in (0.66 m)	8 ft 2 in (2.49 m)	26 reps

Hartings was selected in the first round with the 23rd overall pick of the 1996 NFL draft by the Detroit Lions, where he played from 1996 to 2000. He signed with the Pittsburgh Steelers as a free agent in 2001, where he moved from right guard to center. He was selected to the Pro Bowl in 2004 and 2005. Hartings retired following the 2006 season, citing recurring knee problems.

=== Coaching career ===
In April 2017, Hartings was named the head football coach at Worthington Christian High School.

== Personal life ==
Hartings is one of ten children. A born-again Christian, he has performed missionary work in Nicaragua and helped to start a new non-denominational church with former Detroit Lions teammate Luther Elliss. Since his retirement, he and his wife Rebecca live in Pittsburgh, Pennsylvania and Columbus, Ohio with their eight children, Sierra, Michael, Lucas, Mianna, Isabella, Jullexa, Jovanna and Malachi.

Hartings was a high school teammate and graduating classmate of former Ohio State, Philadelphia Eagle, and Oakland Raider quarterback Bobby Hoying at St. Henry High School, a school with an average graduating class of about 100 students. St. Henry High School also produced accomplished former NFL offensive tackle Jim Lachey.
