= WRKD-LP =

- Rockford, Ohio; United States
- Broadcast area: Rockford, Ohio; Mendon, Ohio; Ohio City, Ohio
- Frequency: 101.3 MHz
- Branding: 101.3 RKD

Programming
- Format: Variety hits

Ownership
- Owner: WRKD-LP Community Radio; (Village of Rockford)

History
- First air date: January 31, 2014
- Call sign meaning: Rockford

Technical information
- Licensing authority: FCC
- Facility ID: 196918
- Class: L1
- ERP: 94 watts
- HAAT: 31 meters (102 ft)
- Transmitter coordinates: 40°40′34.0″N 84°38′44.0″W

Links
- Public license information: LMS
- Webcast: Listen live
- Website: mix1013wrkd.com

WRKD-LP is a Variety Hits formatted broadcast radio station licensed to Rockford, Ohio and serving Rockford, Mendon, and Ohio City in Ohio. WRKD-LP is owned and operated by WRKD-LP Community Radio.
