= Seton High School (Cincinnati, Ohio) =

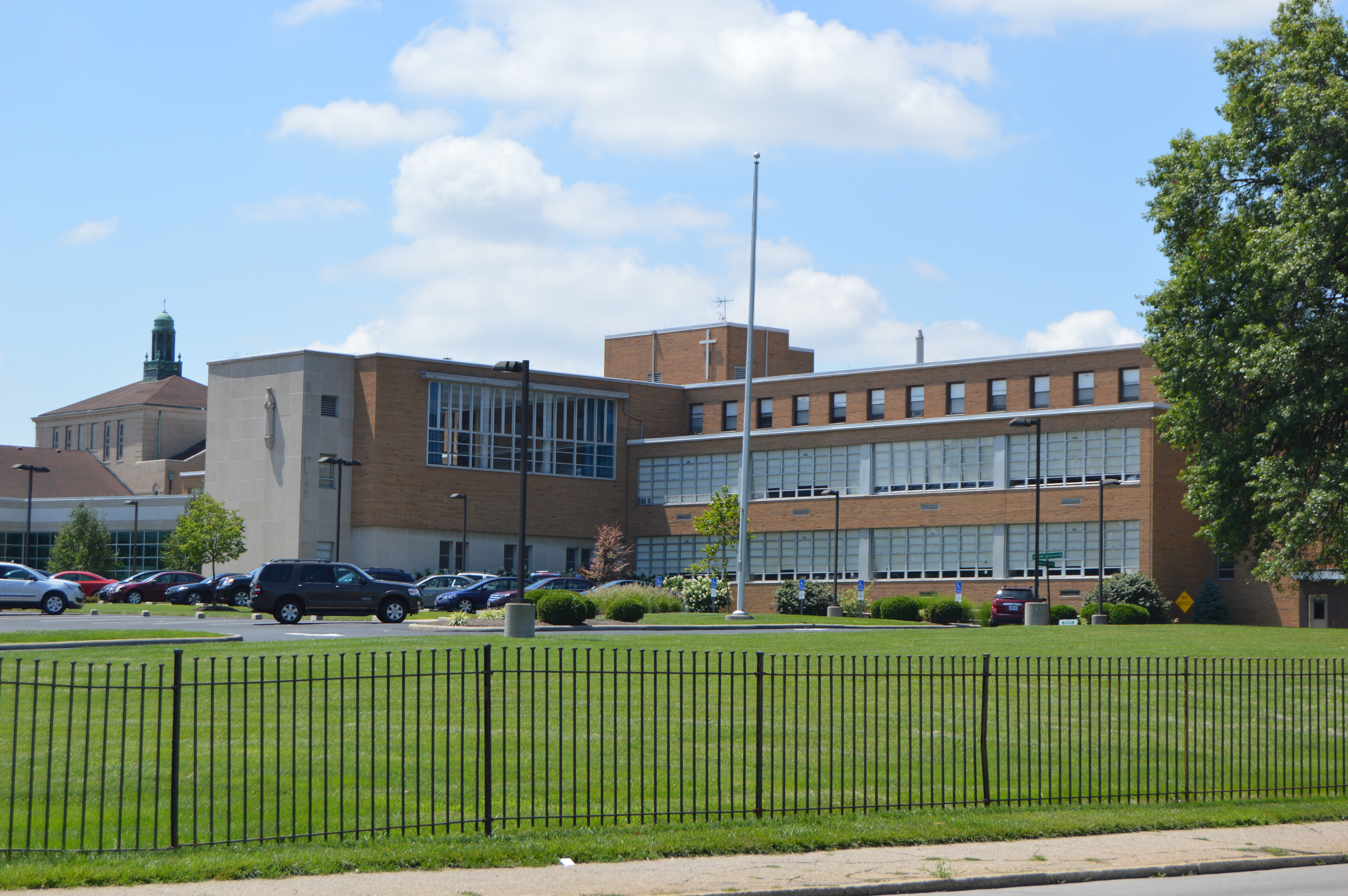
- View from the northeast

Location
- 3901 Glenway Avenue; Price Hill; Cincinnati, (Hamilton County), Ohio 45205; United States; 39°6′47″N 84°34′43″W

Information
- Type: Private, All-Girls
- Motto: Hazard Yet Forward
- Religious affiliation: Roman Catholic
- Established: 1854
- President: Kathy Ciarla
- Principal: Karen Klug White
- Staff: https://setoncincinnati.org/about/faculty-staff-directory/
- Grades: 9–12
- Campus: Urban
- Colors: Green and White
- Athletics conference: Girls Greater Cincinnati League
- Mascot: St. Bernard
- Team name: Saints
- Accreditation: North Central Association of Colleges and Schools
- Newspaper: The Seton Connection
- Yearbook: The Setonian
- Affiliation: Sisters of Charity
- Website: www.setoncincinnati.org

Seton High School is a parochial all-female, college-preparatory high school in the Price Hill neighborhood of Cincinnati, Ohio, USA.

== History ==
Seton was founded as Mount St. Vincent Academy in 1854. It was also known as Cedar Grove. With the arrival of Elder High School's girls' department, Cedar Grove was renamed in honor of Elizabeth Ann Seton on September 12, 1927.

== Academics ==
Seton High school serves girls from 9th to 12th grade. Seton offers many clubs, and classes. People can access which classes there are by going through the pathways they have.

== Athletics ==
As a member of the Girls' Greater Catholic League, Seton teams have won numerous league, district, regional and state championships in 12 varsity sports:

Fall

- Cross Country
- Cheerleading
- Dance
- Golf
- Soccer
- Tennis
- Volleyball

Winter

- Basketball
- Bowling
- Dance
- Swimming & Diving

Spring

- Lacrosse
- Softball
- Track & Field

=== Ohio High School Athletic Association State Championships ===
- Girls Volleyball – 1984, 1985, 1986, 1988, 1996, 2005, 2024, 2025, 2026
- Girls Soccer – 2022, 2026
