= St. John's High School (Delphos, Ohio) =

Location
- 515 East Second Street; Delphos, (Allen County), Ohio 45833-1708; United States; 40°50′36″N 84°20′3″W

Information
- Type: Private, Coeducational
- Religious affiliation: Roman Catholic
- Superintendent: Fr. Jeffery Walker
- Principal: Adam Lee
- Head of school: Nathan Stant
- Grades: 7-12
- Average class size: 12 to 1
- Colors: Royal Blue and Gold
- Slogan: A Tradition Worth Keeping Faith * Tradition * Excellence
- Athletics conference: Midwest Athletic Conference
- Mascot: Blue Jay
- Yearbook: St. John's Crest
- Website: http://www.delphosstjohns.org

St. John's High School is a Roman Catholic private high school located in Delphos, Ohio, United States. It is located in Allen County, and is part of the Roman Catholic Diocese of Toledo. The school's mascot is the Blue Jay. The school is associated with the Midwest Athletic Conference for sports.

== Athletics ==
=== State championships ===
- Baseball – 2026
- Football – 1997, 1998, 1999, 2005, 2008, 2010
- Boys basketball – 1949, 1983, 2002, 2026
- Girls basketball – 1977, 1979, 1980, 1987, 2002

== Notable alumni ==
- Tom Nomina, former defensive tackle for the Denver Broncos and the Miami Dolphins
