= New Knoxville High School =

Public, coeducational high school in New Knoxville, Ohio, United States

Location
- 345 South Main Street; New Knoxville, (Auglaize County), Ohio 45871; United States; 40°29′28″N 84°19′3″W

Information
- Type: Public, Coeducational high school
- Opened: 1938
- Superintendent: Kim Waterman
- Principal: Jenny Fledderjohann
- Teaching staff: 15.00 (FTE)
- Grades: 9-12
- Student to teacher ratio: 7.40
- Colors: Red and Gray
- Slogan: Where Success is a Journey and not a Destination
- Fight song: On Ye' Rangers
- Athletics conference: Midwest Athletic Conference
- Sports: Soccer, Basketball, Volleyball, Track, Cross Country, Golf
- Team name: Rangers
- Rival: New Bremen Cardinals
- Newspaper: The Pulse
- Yearbook: The Memoir
- Website: http://www.nk.k12.oh.us

New Knoxville High School is a public high school located in New Knoxville, Ohio. It is the only high school in the New Knoxville Local School district.

== Athletics ==
New Knoxville is a member of the Midwest Athletic Conference, and their mascot is the Ranger.

The Rangers compete in Division IV in the state of Ohio and offer six varsity sports for men and women. The men's sports include Basketball, Baseball, Soccer, Cross Country, Track and Field, and Golf. Women's sports include Basketball, Volleyball, Track and Field, Cheerleading, Soccer, and Cross Country.

During the 2007, 2008, and 2009 seasons, the New Knoxville men's basketball program was highly regarded in the state of Ohio. The team achieved remarkable success, with a combined record of 75-2 over the three seasons. New Knoxville won their first ever state championship in any sport when the boys' basketball team beat Worthington Christian 74-52 on March 15, 2008, while maintaining an undefeated record.

=== Ohio High School Athletic Association State Championships ===
- Boys Basketball – 2008
- Girls Volleyball - 2021

=== Ohio High School Athletic Association State Runners-Up ===
- Boys Basketball - 1947
- Girls Basketball – 2007, 2022
- Volleyball - 2006

=== Ohio High School Athletic Association State Final Fours ===
- Girls Track and Field - 2001, 2002
- Volleyball - 1989
