= Versailles High School =

Location
- 280 Marker Road; Versailles, (Darke County), Ohio 45380; United States; 40°13′4″N 84°29′0″W

Information
- Type: Public high school
- Established: 1890
- School district: Versailles Exempted Village Schools
- Superintendent: David Harmon
- Principal: Jacki Stonebraker
- Teaching staff: 28.00 (FTE)
- Grades: 9-12
- Enrollment: 411 (2022-23)
- Average class size: 100 Students
- Student to teacher ratio: 14.68
- Colors: Orange and Black
- Fight song: On you Tigers!
- Athletics conference: Midwest Athletic Conference
- Sports: Football, Cross Country, Volleyball, Golf, Basketball, Wrestling, Swimming, Bowling, Baseball, Softball, Track and Field
- Mascot: Tigers
- Rival: Marion Local High School, Russia High School
- Accreditation: North Central Association of Colleges and Schools
- Newspaper: The Tiger
- Yearbook: The Portal
- Website: School website

Versailles High School is a public high school in Versailles, Ohio. It is the only high school in the Versailles Exempted Village School District. The Versailles Tigers are a member of the Midwest Athletic Conference. The current High School Principal is Jacki Stonebraker.

== Stats ==
Serving an average of 400-420 students in grades 9-12 each year, VHS ranks in the top 5% of all 3,241 schools in Ohio for overall test scores (math proficiency is top 5%, and reading proficiency is top 5%).

The percentage of students achieving proficiency in math is 85-89% (which is higher than the Ohio state average of 52%).

The percentage of students achieving proficiency in reading/language arts is 90-94% (which is higher than the Ohio state average of 60%).

The student:teacher ratio of 15:1 is lower than the Ohio state level of 17:1.

Minority enrollment is 1% of the student body, which is lower than the Ohio state average of 33%.

== Educational Rankings ==
Versailles High School ranks among the top 20% of public schools in Ohio for:

Highest overall rank (Top 5%)

Highest math proficiency (Top 5%)

Highest reading/language arts proficiency (Top 1%)

Highest science proficiency (Top 1%)

Highest graduation rate (Top 10%)

== Athletics ==
The athletic program of the Versailles School District is described as an important part of the learning and growth for the children and youth of the community. The program's stated goals include supporting student's physical, emotional, intellectual, and morals through participation in athletics. The program stated coaches and teachers as an important role in guiding students during daily interactions both in classroom and athletic settings such as field, track, and court.

The Versailles Tigers are a member of the competitive Midwest Athletic Conference (MAC). The Tigers have been a top contender in numerous sports with state championships as well. Prior to joining the MAC, Versailles was a member of the Southwestern Rivers Conference from 1982-2001.

Title	Sport	Season	Name
Athletic Director	All	All	Broerman, Scott
Athletic Trainer	All	All	Keith, Chad
Head Coach	Football	Fall	Jones, Ryan
Head Coach	Bowling	Winter	Phlipot, Tyler
Head Coach	Track & Field	Spring	Giere, Doug
Head Coach	Softball	Spring	Cotrell, Tatyana
Head Coach	Baseball	Spring	Stoll, Greg
Head Coach	Gymnastics	Winter	Pothast, Jessica
Head Coach	Swim	Winter	Subler, Ryan
Head Coach	Basketball	Winter	Swank, Travis
Head Coach	Basketball	Winter	White, Tracy
Head Coach	Volleyball	Fall	McNeilan, Liz
Head Coach	Cross Country	Fall	Pleiman, Mark
Head Coach	Wrestling	Winter	Bey, Jerry
Head Coach	Golf	Fall	Keiser, Niccole
Head Coach	Golf	Fall	Hecht, Chris

=== OHSAA State Championships ===
- Football: - 1967, 1990, 1993, 1994, 1995, 1998, 2003, 2021
- Baseball – 1965
- Girls Cross Country – 2003, 2007
- Girls Basketball - 2008, 2015
- Girls Track & Field - 2010, 2012, 2013
- Girls Volleyball - 2013, 2017, 2018, 2026

== K-12 School Building ==
New Build: In 2009, Versailles Exempted Village School District commissioned Freytag & Associates, Inc. for a new school building serving grades K-12. This large new facility was designed so that the District could continue its current successful teaching methods and build upon them in the future. The building is divided into three smaller school sections: Elementary, Middle and High School. The new building houses up to 1,400 students from preschool through high school and covers 226,310 square feet. The center of the school, the media center, is divided into three separate reading rooms to correspond to the different school sections. Large North-facing windows provide pleasant indirect natural light for reading and studying. The school officially opened for the 2010-2011 school year.

Expansion: On December 15, 2022, construction began on a building expansion dubbed Project Opportunity. Project Opportunity is considered the necessary next step in a district with expanding music, FFA and STEM programs. The VEVS music program has increased by 75 percent, from roughly 40 students to 70 students; FFA has increased courses and grown to 180-plus students in grades eight to 12 with two full-time teachers; and STEM programs have increased dramatically in the past 12 years. Because of this growth, Versailles Schools is adding an expansion on the south part of the school building. This project is called Project Opportunity. The addition will include new band, STEM, weight, and multi-purpose rooms along with a lobby and more storage areas.

Versailles Performing Arts Center (Winner of the AS&U Outstanding Design Award) - The Versailles Performing Arts Center is a distinct performance auditorium with the ability to seat 450, utilized by the school and the community. The space was designed with extensive use of brick, red oak wood trim and features stone plaques that were salvaged from the former elementary school. This space is fully equipped for state-of-the-art sound and lighting for theatrical and music performances with a fully rigged stage for a wide variety of performances and special events. The building houses two gymnasiums with large divider curtains that can be raised and lowered as needed. Other spaces include two large art rooms, a full-service kitchen, student locker rooms with showers, central storage area with dock leveler, a large vocal music room, an instrumental music room, and four computer labs. The project was complete on time and on budget.

Versailles High School is the 123rd-ranked school building of 3172 Ohio school buildings, which is in the top 4% of all school buildings in the state.
