= New Bremen High School =

Location
- 901 East Monroe Street; New Bremen, (Auglaize County), Ohio 45869; United States
- Coordinates: 40°26′11″N 84°21′43″W

Information
- Type: Public, Coeducational high school
- Established: 1879
- Superintendent: Jason Schrader
- Principal: Marcus Overman
- Teaching staff: 21.00 (FTE)
- Grades: 9–12
- Student to teacher ratio: 18.48
- Campus: New Bremen
- Colors: Crimson and Gold
- Athletics conference: Midwest Athletic Conference
- Team name: Cardinals
- Rival: Minster and New Knoxville
- Yearbook: The Mirage
- State Championships: 5
- Website: New Bremen High School

New Bremen High School is a public high school in New Bremen, Ohio. Located in Auglaize County, it is the only high school in the New Bremen Local Schools district. Their nickname is the Cardinals. They are a member of the Midwest Athletic Conference.

== Athletics ==
The Cardinals are a member of the Midwest Athletic Conference.

=== Ohio High School Athletic Association State Championships ===
- Girls Volleyball – 2017, 2019, 2022, 2023
- Boys Football – 2020, 2022
