= Coldwater, Ohio =

- Village
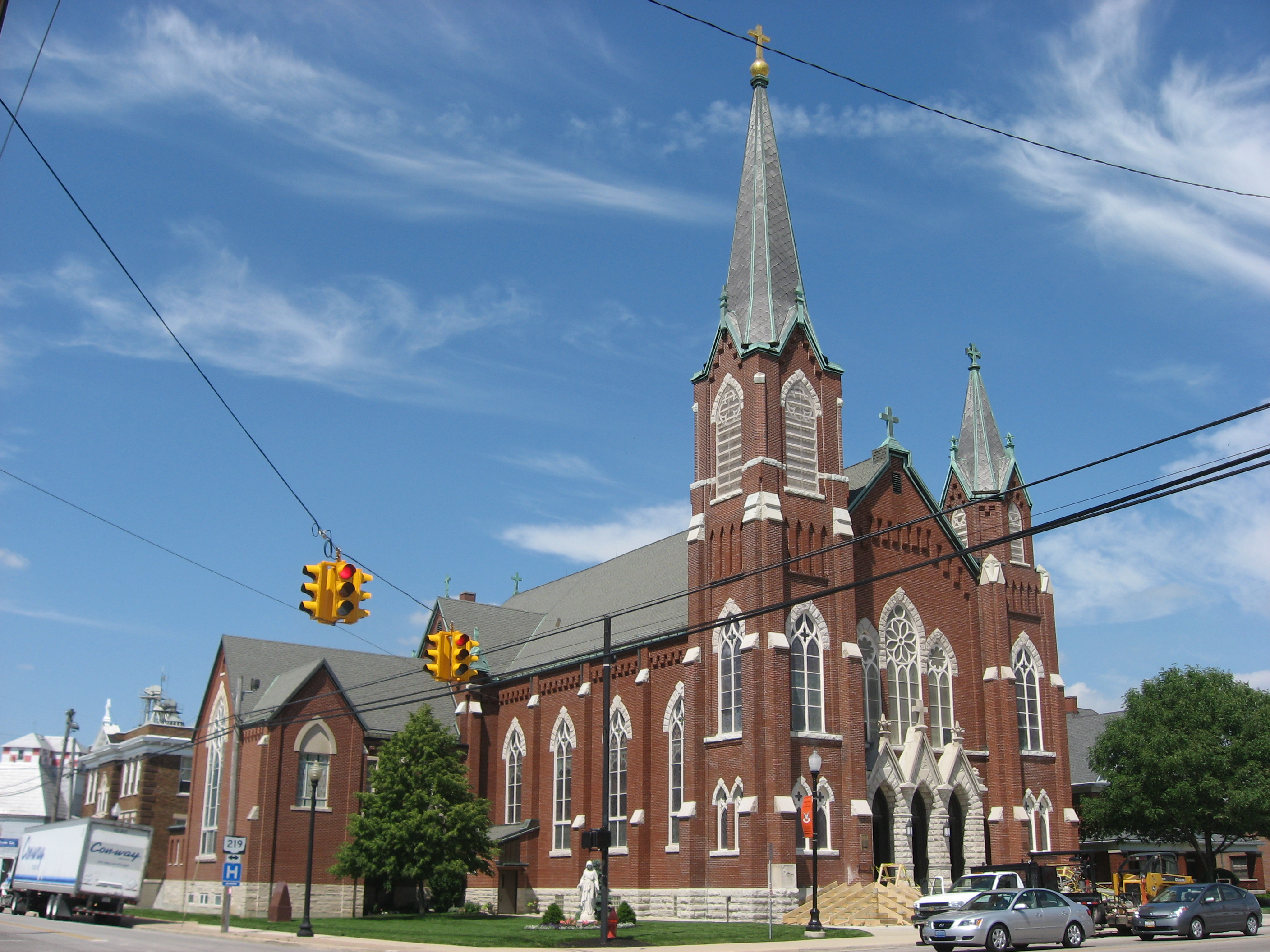
- Holy Trinity Catholic Church, which dominates the village's skyline

- Seal

- Location in Mercer County and the state of Ohio.
- Coordinates: 40°29′02″N 84°37′30″W
- Country: United States
- State: Ohio
- County: Mercer
- Township: Butler

Government
  - Mayor: Douglas Bertke

Area
  - Total: 1.99 sq mi (5.16 km^{2})
  - Land: 1.94 sq mi (5.02 km^{2})
  - Water: 0.050 sq mi (0.13 km^{2})
- Elevation: 899 ft (274 m)

Population (2020)
  - Total: 4,774
  - Estimate (2023): 4,712
  - Density: 2,461.9/sq mi (950.53/km^{2})
- Time zone: UTC-5 (Eastern (EST))
  - Summer (DST): UTC-4 (EDT)
- ZIP code: 45828
- Area code: 419
- FIPS code: 39-16532
- GNIS feature ID: 2398595
- Website: villageofcoldwater.com

Coldwater is a village in Mercer County, Ohio, United States. The population was 4,774 at the 2020 census.

== History ==
Coldwater was founded in 1838 and was originally called Buzzard's Glory, named after David Buzzard who operated a general store. Coldwater was platted in 1859. The village takes its name from nearby Coldwater Creek. A post office has been in operation at Coldwater since 1847.

== Geography ==
According to the United States Census Bureau, the village has a total area of 1.97 square miles (5.10 km^{2}), of which 1.92 square miles (4.97 km^{2}) is land and 0.05 square miles (0.13 km^{2}) is water.

== Demographics ==
Historical population
Census	Pop.	Note	%±
1880	1,001		—
1890	1,276		27.5%
1900	1,515		18.7%
1910	1,114		−26.5%
1920	974		−12.6%
1930	1,516		55.6%
1940	2,449		61.5%
1950	3,702		51.2%
1960	4,151		12.1%
1970	3,952		−4.8%
1980	4,007		1.4%
1990	4,411		10.1%
2000	4,482		1.6%
2010	4,427		−1.2%
2020	4,774		7.8%
2023 (est.)	4,712	▼	−1.3%
U.S. Decennial Census

=== 2020 census ===
As of the 2020 census, Coldwater had a population of 4,774. The median age was 35.4 years. 27.7% of residents were under the age of 18 and 15.9% of residents were 65 years of age or older. For every 100 females there were 101.8 males, and for every 100 females age 18 and over there were 96.1 males age 18 and over.

0.0% of residents lived in urban areas, while 100.0% lived in rural areas.

There were 1,833 households in Coldwater, of which 33.8% had children under the age of 18 living in them. Of all households, 58.5% were married-couple households, 16.0% were households with a male householder and no spouse or partner present, and 21.6% were households with a female householder and no spouse or partner present. About 28.7% of all households were made up of individuals and 12.8% had someone living alone who was 65 years of age or older.

There were 1,906 housing units, of which 3.8% were vacant. The homeowner vacancy rate was 0.1% and the rental vacancy rate was 5.0%.

Racial composition as of the 2020 census
Race	Number	Percent
White	4,524	94.8%
Black or African American	14	0.3%
American Indian and Alaska Native	10	0.2%
Asian	9	0.2%
Native Hawaiian and Other Pacific Islander	73	1.5%
Some other race	31	0.6%
Two or more races	113	2.4%
Hispanic or Latino (of any race)	102	2.1%

=== 2010 census ===
As of the census of 2010, there were 4,427 people, 1,726 households, and 1,176 families residing in the village. The population density was 2,305.7 inhabitants per square mile (890.2/km^{2}). There were 1,817 housing units at an average density of 946.4 per square mile (365.4/km^{2}). The racial makeup of the village was 99.0% White, 0.1% African American, 0.1% Asian, 0.3% Pacific Islander, 0.2% from other races, and 0.3% from two or more races. Hispanic or Latino of any race were 0.7% of the population.

There were 1,726 households, of which 32.7% had children under the age of 18 living with them, 58.1% were married couples living together, 6.5% had a female householder with no husband present, 3.5% had a male householder with no wife present, and 31.9% were non-families. 29.1% of all households were made up of individuals, and 15.2% had someone living alone who was 65 years of age or older. The average household size was 2.49 and the average family size was 3.10.

The median age in the village was 39.2 years. 26.2% of residents were under the age of 18; 7.9% were between the ages of 18 and 24; 22.9% were from 25 to 44; 25.9% were from 45 to 64; and 17.1% were 65 years of age or older. The gender makeup of the village was 47.9% male and 52.1% female.

=== 2000 census ===
As of 2000 the median income for a household in the village was $63,382, and the median income for a family was $81,076. Males had a median income of $47,055 versus $42,401 for females. The per capita income for the village was $29,583. About 2.2% of families and 3.4% of the population were below the poverty line, including 1.2% of those under age 18 and 4.2% of those age 65 or over.

== Education ==
It is home to Coldwater High School, Coldwater Middle School, and Coldwater Elementary School, public schools that are part of the Coldwater Exempted Village School District.

== Economy ==
Coldwater is home to Totally Promotional, an online manufacturer and retailer of customized promotional products; as of February 2023, the firm employed about 230 people.

Major local employers include Mercer Health’s Mercer County Community Hospital, whose main campus is located in the village; the hospital completed a major west-wing expansion in 2018.

The village also hosts a Lincoln Electric Automation facility (formerly Coldwater Machine Company), part of Lincoln Electric’s automation division following its 2018 acquisition of Coldwater Machine. Industry sources also note quality-system certifications at the Coldwater operation.

Other manufacturers with facilities in Coldwater include Basic Grain Products, a snack-foods producer known for rice cakes, and Val-Co/Val-Co Pax, which manufactures poultry and swine production equipment at 210 E. Main Street.

Historically, Coldwater was home to New Idea farm equipment manufacturing; production at the Coldwater plant ceased in 1999 after ownership changes in the 1980s–1990s.

In recent years the village also hosted a flexible-packaging plant under the Shields/Accutech brand of Novolex; in October 2023 the company notified state officials it would close the Coldwater facility.

=== Library ===
It is home to the Coldwater Public Library, which is largely funded by the proceeds from the annual Coldwater Community Picnic.

== Notable people ==
- Douglas Laux, New York Times bestselling author; CIA case officer
- Keith Wenning, former practice squad quarterback for the Buffalo Bills
- Keven Stammen, professional poker player, winner of 2014 World Poker Tour
- Ross Homan, former linebacker for the Ohio State Buckeyes
- Jesse E. Moorland, abolitionist and theology professor at Howard University
- Cory Luebke, former pitcher for the San Diego Padres
- James Grover McDonald, first U.S. ambassador to Israel, humanitarian
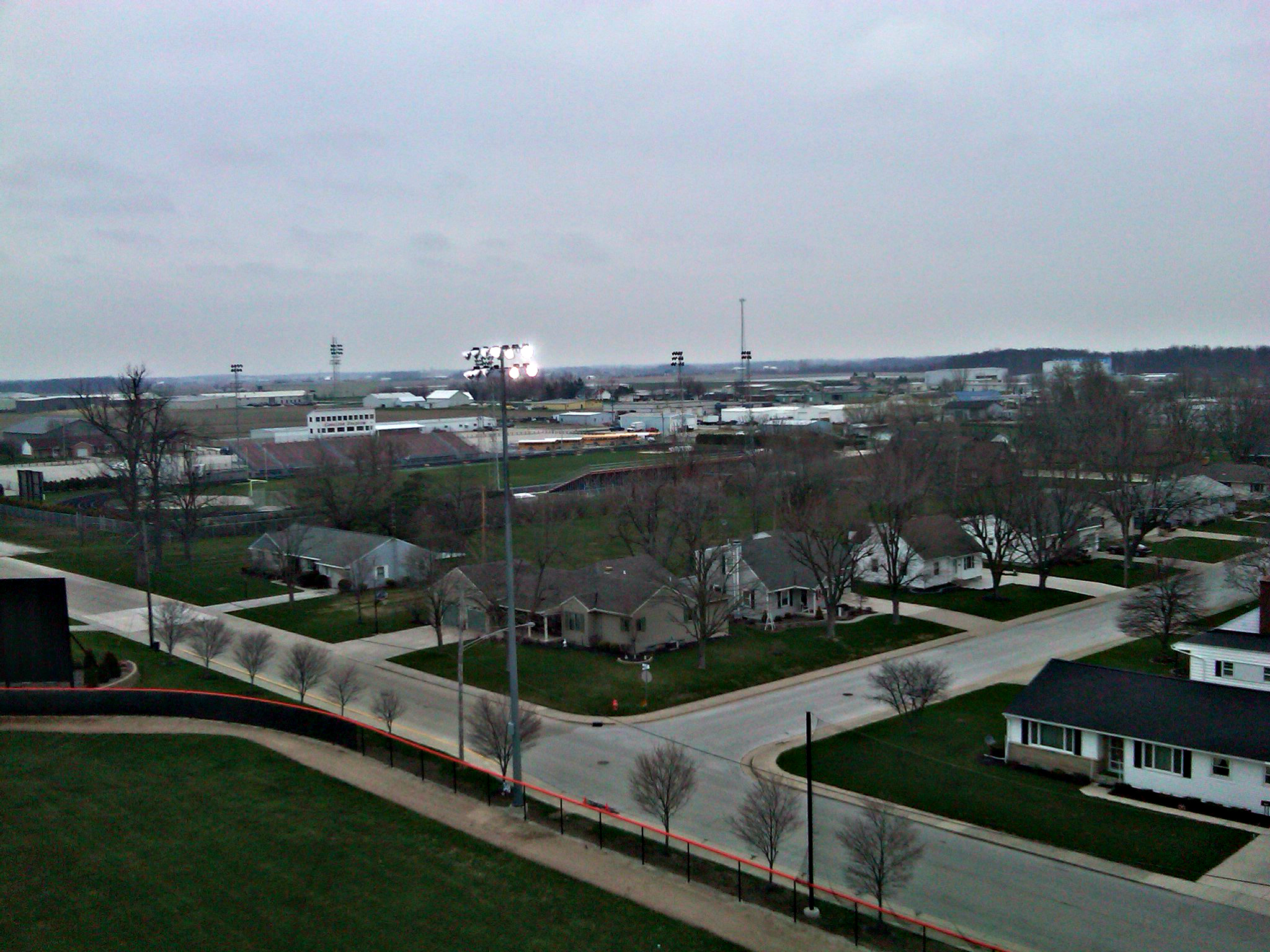
The northeastern section.

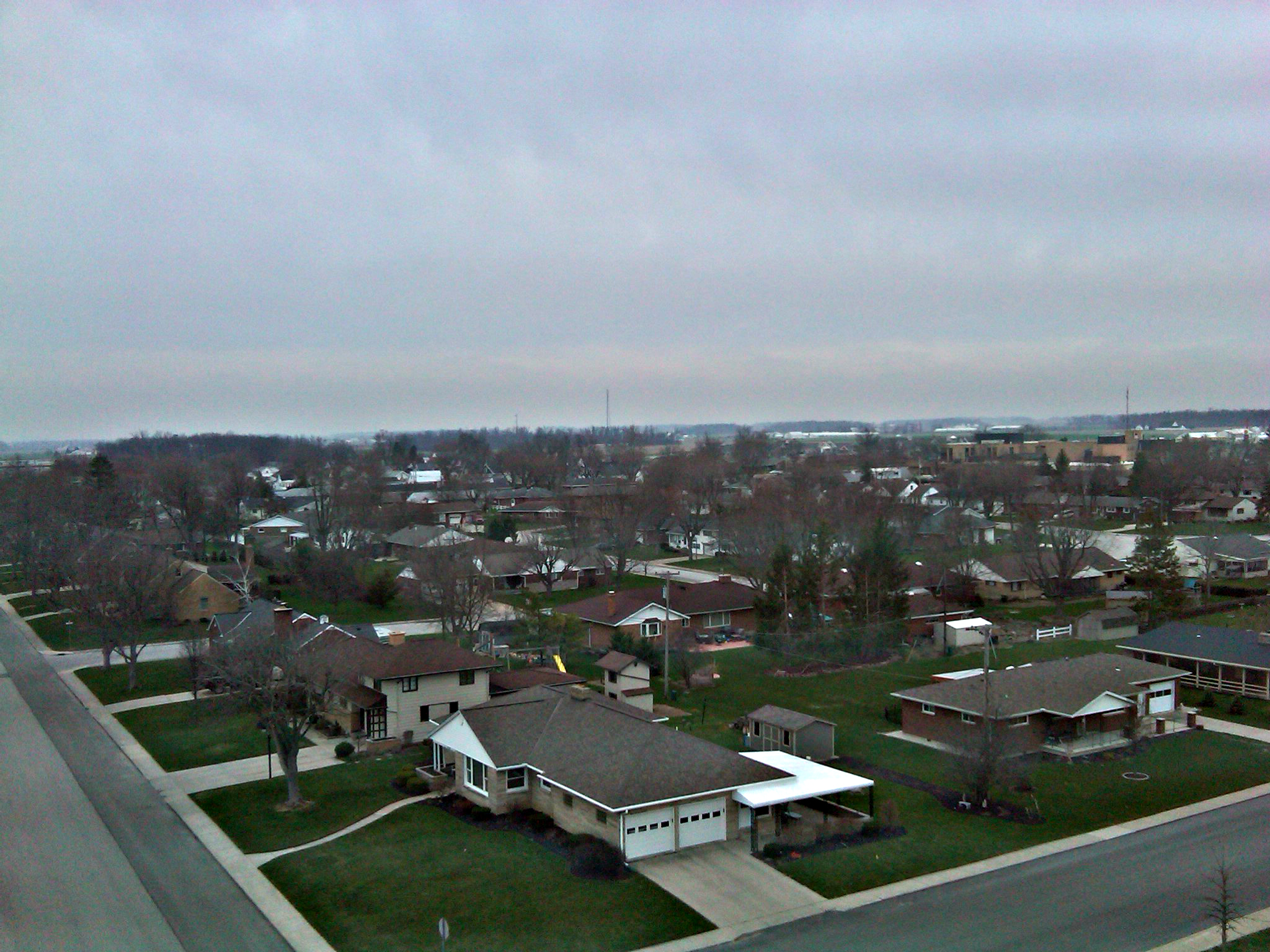
The southwestern section.

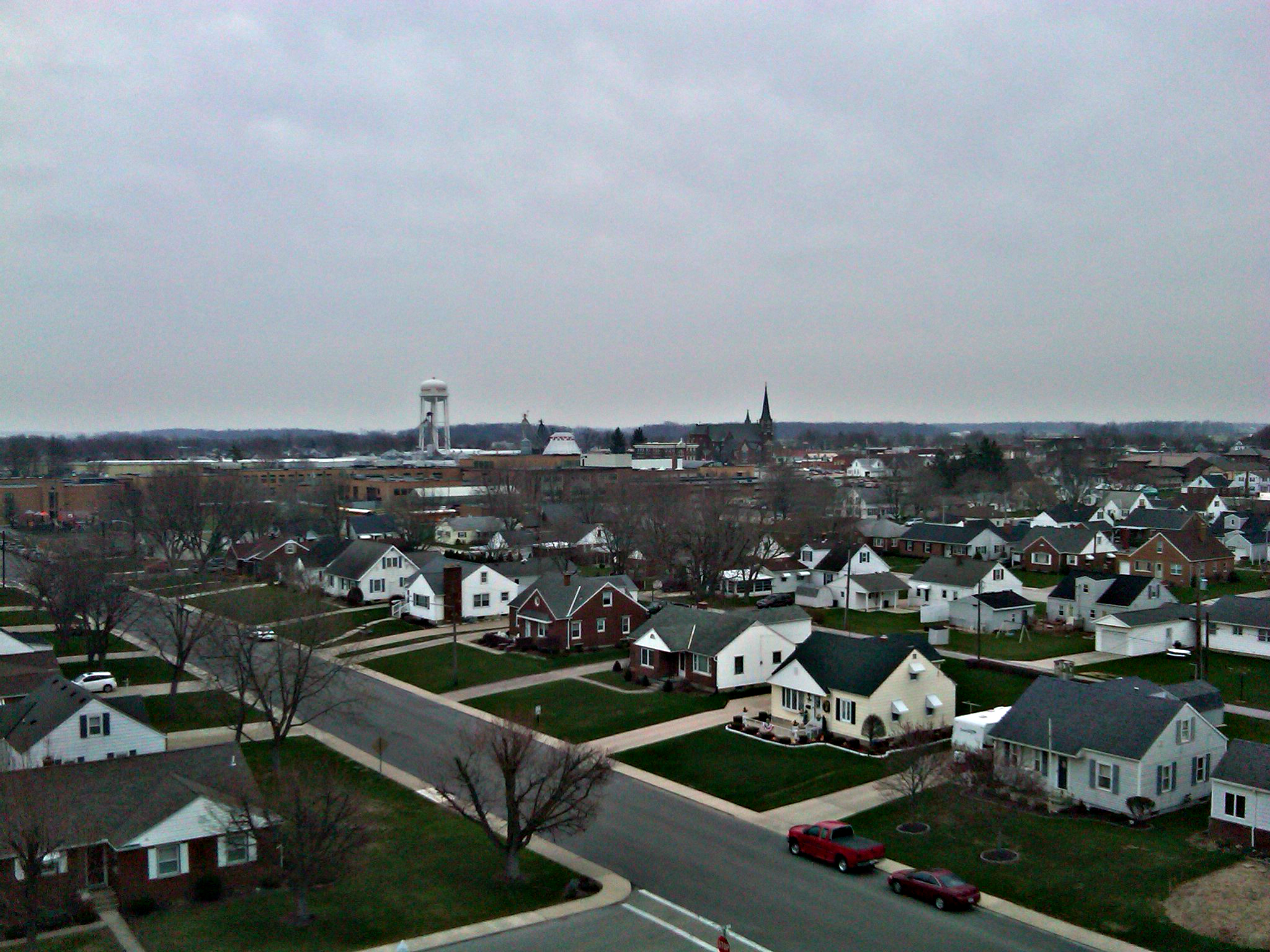
The southeastern section.
