= Parkway High School (Ohio) =

Location
- 400 Buckeye St. Rockford, (Mercer County), Ohio 45882; United States
- Coordinates: 40°41′00″N 84°39′05″W

Information
- Type: Public, Coeducational high school
- Teaching staff: 18.01 (FTE)
- Grades: 9-12
- Student to teacher ratio: 15.88
- Colors: Black & Old Gold
- Athletics conference: Midwest Athletic Conference
- Mascot: Peete
- Team name: Panthers
- Website: Parkway High School

Parkway High School is a public high school located in Rockford, Ohio. It is the only high school in the Parkway Local Schools district. Their nickname is the Panthers. They are a member of the Midwest Athletic Conference. Parkway Local School District was created in 1961–1962, when Willshire and Rockford School Districts merged. Mendon-Union joined Parkway Local School District during the 1992–1993 school year.

== Ohio High School Athletic Association State Championships ==
- Baseball - 1987, 1991
- Girls Volleyball – 1996, 1997
- Boys Track: Jacob Fox 110 Meter Hurdles and Long Jump 2007

OHSAA State Appearances:

- Girls Volleyball: 2005 (Runners-Up), 2010
- Softball: 1997, 1998, 2013, 2023
- Girls Track: 1987 Runner Up
- Girls Volleyball: 2010 State Semi-Finalist

== Notable alumni ==
- Jordan Thompson - Detroit Lions
