= Rockford, Ohio =

- Village
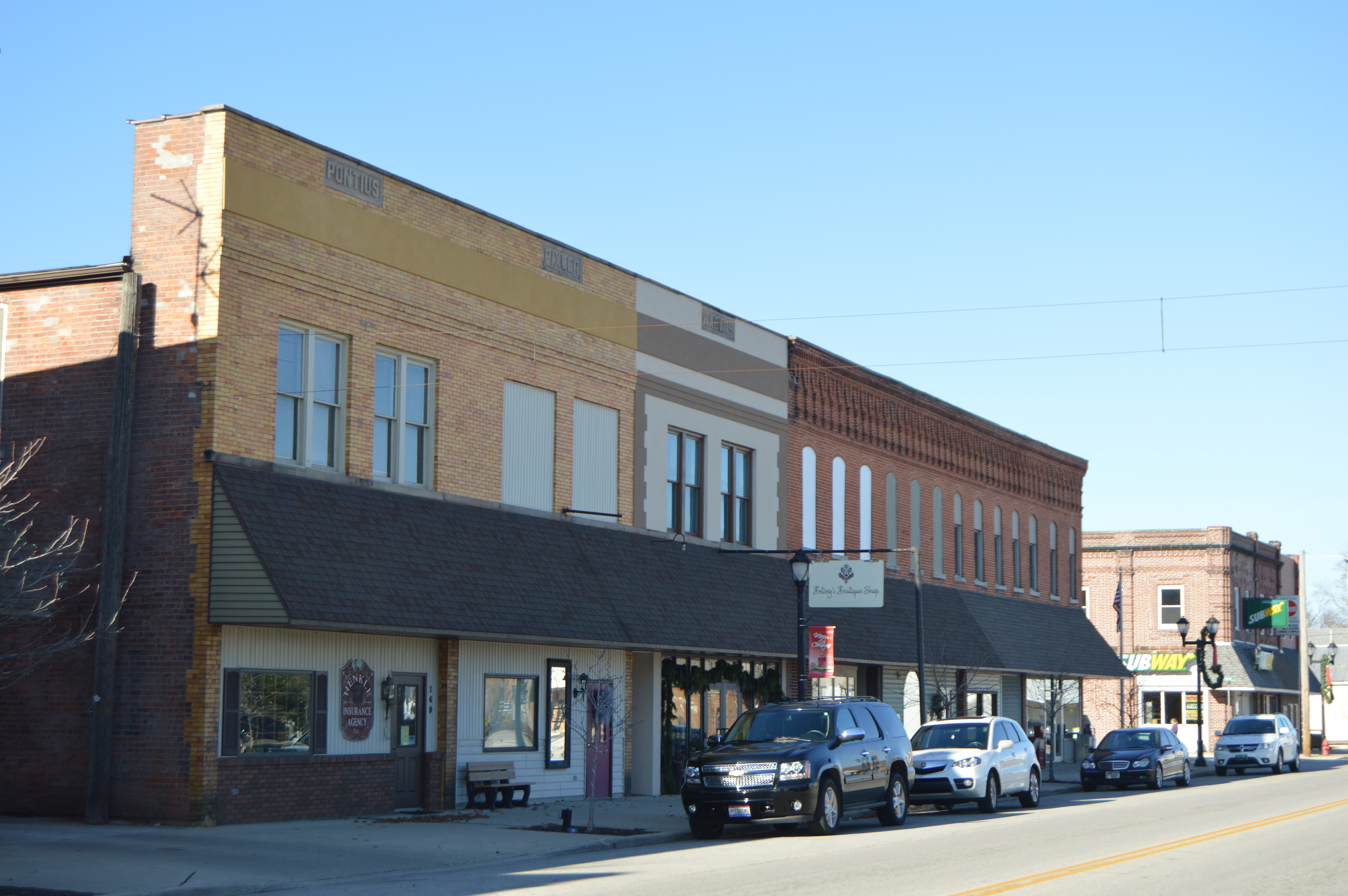
- Main Street downtown
- Motto: "Oldest Village in Mercer County"
- Location in Mercer County and the state of Ohio.
- Coordinates: 40°41′28″N 84°38′59″W
- Country: United States
- State: Ohio
- County: Mercer
- Township: Dublin

Government
  - Mayor: Amy Joseph

Area
  - Total: 0.88 sq mi (2.28 km^{2})
  - Land: 0.86 sq mi (2.24 km^{2})
  - Water: 0.015 sq mi (0.04 km^{2})
- Elevation: 807 ft (246 m)

Population (2020)
  - Total: 1,051
  - Density: 1,215.8/sq mi (469.43/km^{2})
- Time zone: UTC-5 (Eastern (EST))
  - Summer (DST): UTC-4 (EDT)
- ZIP code: 45882
- Area code: 419
- FIPS code: 39-67874
- GNIS feature ID: 2399105
- Website: Village website

Rockford is a village in Mercer County, Ohio, United States. The village is on the St. Mary's River near the center of the western Ohio border 12 miles Northwest of Celina. The population was 1,051 at the 2020 census.

The village was founded in 1815 by French-Indian trader Anthony Madore, and was originally named Shanesville.

== Name ==
=== Anthony Shane ===
Anthony Shane, born Antoine Chene, was a French-Indian trader who lived with his wife in a double-log cabin north of the current area of Rockford. He ran a trading post, and was given a large tract of land known as the Shanes Grant for his role as a scout for General Anthony Wayne's army. The grant consisted of 640 acres (2.6 km^{2}) north of the town and 320 acres (1.3 km^{2}) at the town site.

On June 23, 1820, Shane filed his plot to the town of Shanesville, which then comprised 42 lots on the south side of the river. Shane lived in Shanesville until 1832, when acting as a government agent, he accompanied the Shawnee Indians to Kansas. It is not known if he ever returned to Shanesville.

=== Changes ===
Shanesville was renamed Shane's Crossing, and eventually renamed again to Rockford by Post Office Department decree.

== History ==
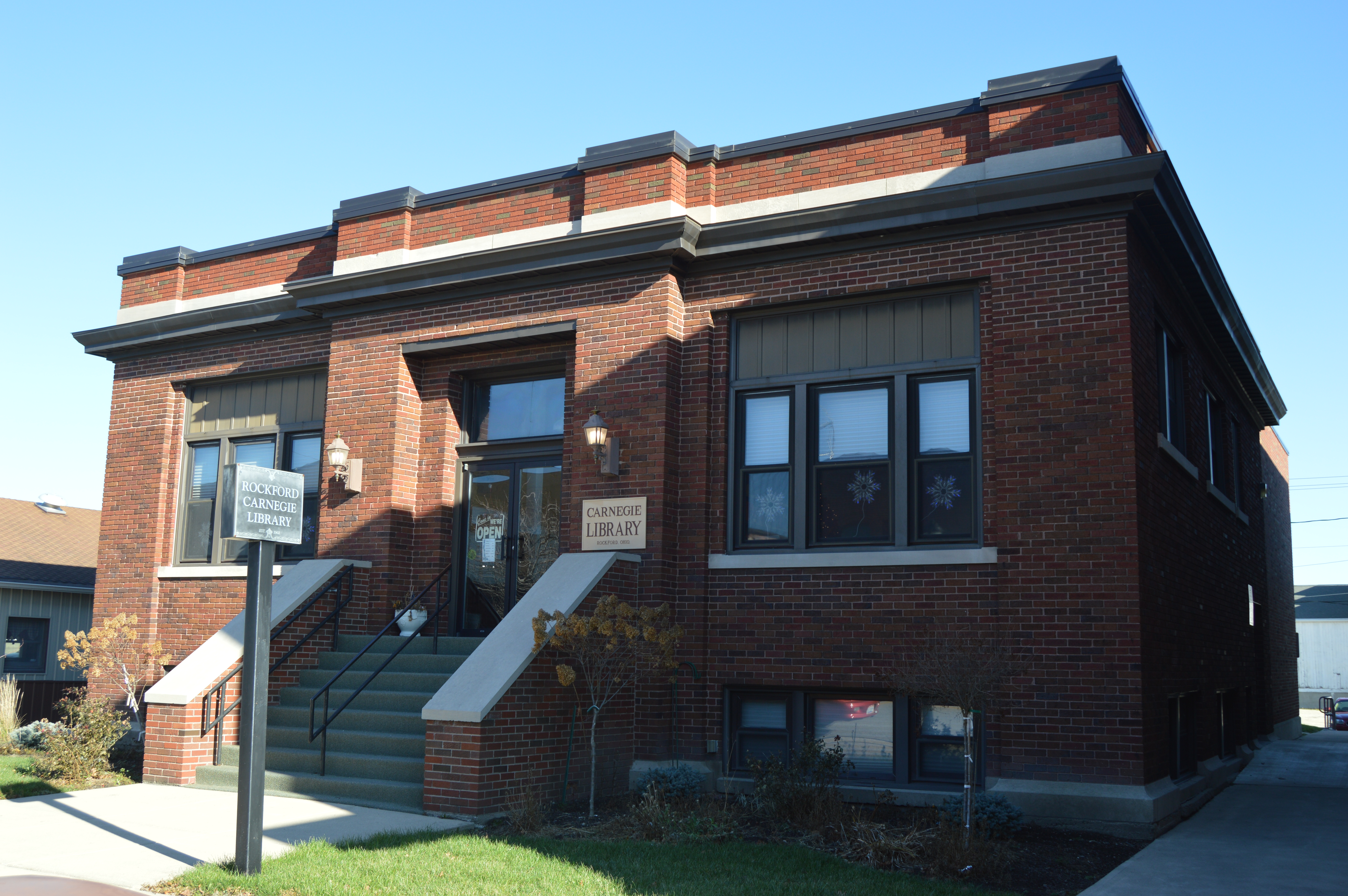
Carnegie library

Prior to European colonisation, the high ground adjacent to St. Marys River at Rockford was used as a camping ground and village site for Native American tribes. Artefacts including weapons and tools have been found on the site.

Early traders, trappers and adventurers used the St. Marys River as a thoroughfare, and frequented trails along the banks of the river. Most notable of these is the Piqua-Fort Wayne Trail linking the Great Lakes to the Ohio River, which crossed to the north bank at Rockford.

During the Indian Wars of the late 18th century, many armies transited Rockhold, most notably General Josiah Harmar en route to his defeat at Kekionga. General Anthony Wayne built Fort Adams in the area of Rockford in the early August 1794, as a temporary relay station and supply depot. Fort Adams was initially garrisoned with 100 soldiers under the command of Lieutenant Underhill. Fort Adams was abandoned in 1796, and is now an archaeological preserve operated by The Archaeological Conservancy. There are no physical remains of the fort.

The earliest records of Rockford originate from French-Indian trader Anthony Madore, who operated a trading post to the north of the current town, on the southern bank of the St. Marys River. It is not known how long Madore owned the post, but he died around 1815.

During the War of 1812, General William Henry Harrison camped in Rockford en route to fight the British and Indian coalition. He was joined at the camp by 200 mounted Ohio volunteers and 800 foot soldiers.

== Geography ==
According to the United States Census Bureau, the village has a total area of 0.84 square miles (2.18 km^{2}), of which 0.82 square miles (2.12 km^{2}) is land and 0.02 square miles (0.05 km^{2}) is water.

== Demographics ==
Historical population
Census	Pop.	Note	%±
1890	993		—
1900	1,207		21.6%
1910	1,186		−1.7%
1920	1,075		−9.4%
1930	887		−17.5%
1940	1,066		20.2%
1950	1,112		4.3%
1960	1,155		3.9%
1970	1,207		4.5%
1980	1,245		3.1%
1990	1,119		−10.1%
2000	1,126		0.6%
2010	1,120		−0.5%
2020	1,051		−6.2%
U.S. Decennial Census

=== 2010 census ===
As of the census of 2010, there were 1,120 people, 454 households, and 301 families residing in the village. The population density was 1,365.9 inhabitants per square mile (527.4/km^{2}). There were 495 housing units at an average density of 603.7 per square mile (233.1/km^{2}). The racial makeup of the village was 96.3% White, 0.5% African American, 0.2% Native American, 0.3% Asian, 1.1% from other races, and 1.7% from two or more races. Hispanic or Latino of any race were 2.5% of the population.

There were 454 households, of which 30.4% had children under the age of 18 living with them, 48.5% were married couples living together, 14.5% had a female householder with no husband present, 3.3% had a male householder with no wife present, and 33.7% were non-families. 29.3% of all households were made up of individuals, and 14.5% had someone living alone who was 65 years of age or older. The average household size was 2.41 and the average family size was 2.96.

The median age in the village was 41.5 years. 24.3% of residents were under the age of 18; 7.1% were between the ages of 18 and 24; 23.5% were from 25 to 44; 26.3% were from 45 to 64; and 18.8% were 65 years of age or older. The gender makeup of the village was 47.0% male and 53.0% female.

=== 2000 census ===
As of the census of 2000, there were 1,126 people, 453 households, and 298 families residing in the village. The population density was 1,747.9 inhabitants per square mile (674.9/km^{2}). There were 489 housing units at an average density of 759.1 per square mile (293.1/km^{2}). The racial makeup of the village was 99.11% White, 0.27% African American, 0.53% Native American, and 0.09% from two or more races. Hispanic or Latino of any race were 1.51% of the population.

There were 453 households, out of which 32.2% had children under the age of 18 living with them, 52.5% were married couples living together, 11.3% had a female householder with no husband present, and 34.0% were non-families. 31.1% of all households were made up of individuals, and 14.6% had someone living alone who was 65 years of age or older. The average household size was 2.42 and the average family size was 3.05.

In the village, the population was spread out, with 26.4% under the age of 18, 7.7% from 18 to 24, 28.5% from 25 to 44, 21.2% from 45 to 64, and 16.2% who were 65 years of age or older. The median age was 36 years. For every 100 females there were 87.0 males. For every 100 females age 18 and over, there were 84.6 males.

The median income for a household in the village was $37,574, and the median income for a family was $45,735. Males had a median income of $30,980 versus $23,125 for females. The per capita income for the village was $18,699. About 4.8% of families and 6.7% of the population were below the poverty line, including 8.2% of those under age 18 and 12.8% of those age 65 or over.

== Education ==
Parkway Local Schools

== Media ==
The community is served by WRKD-LP 101.3 FM

== Notable people ==
- Jordan Thompson, American football player.
- Earl Wilson, New York gossip columnist
