= Archbold High School =

Public school in Ohio, United States

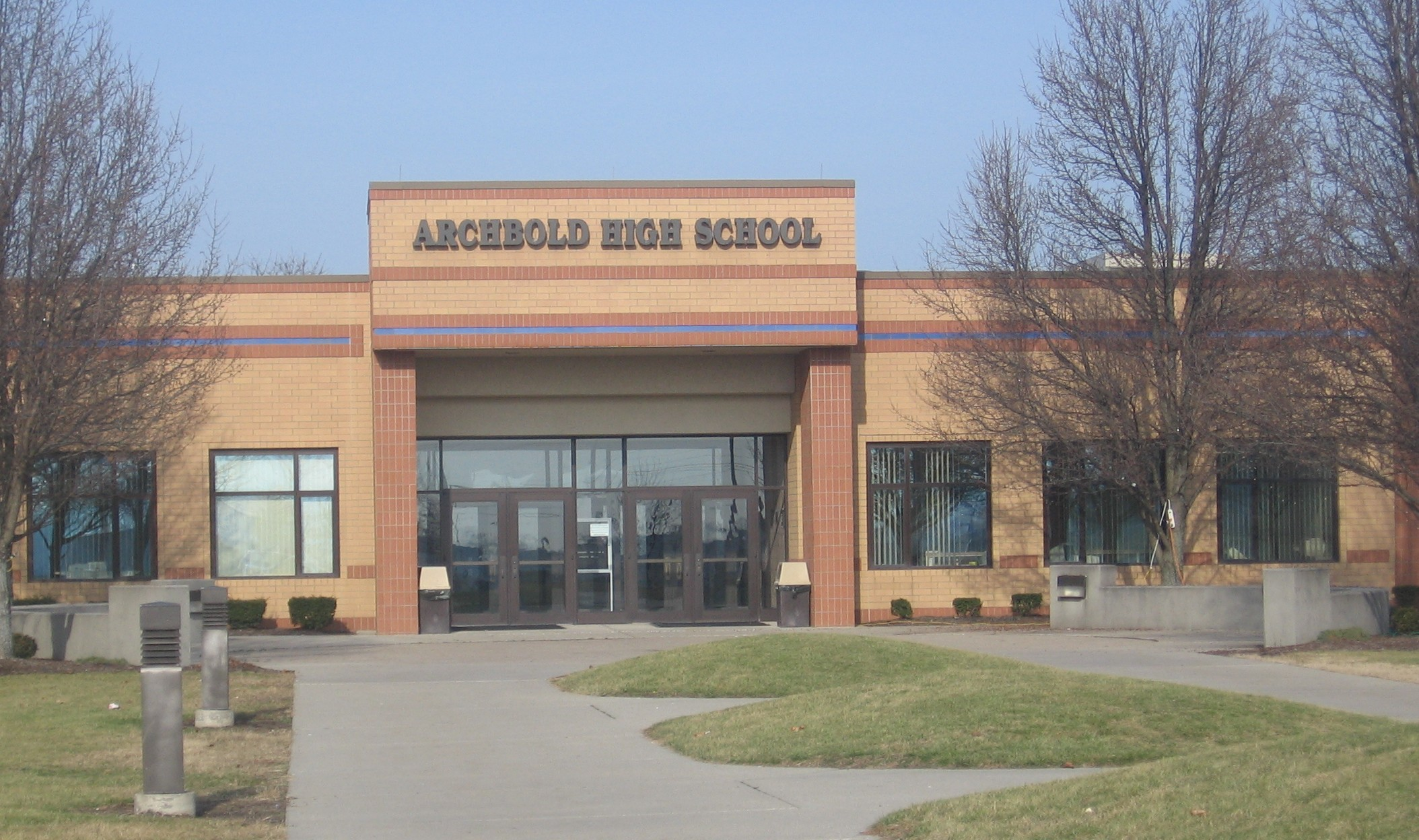
- Archbold High School

Location
- 600 Lafayette Street; Archbold, Ohio 43502; United States; 41°30′56″N 84°18′47″W

Information
- Type: Public, coeducational
- Established: 1990
- School district: Archbold Area Schools
- Principal: Royal Short
- Teaching staff: 15.88 (FTE)
- Grades: 9–12
- Enrollment: 326 (2024–2025)
- Student to teacher ratio: 20.53
- Campus type: Rural
- Colors: Navy blue and gold
- Athletics conference: Northwest Ohio Athletic League
- Team name: Blue Streaks
- Rival: Wauseon Indians
- Website: sites.google.com/archboldschools.org/ahs/home

Archbold High School is a public high school in Archbold, Ohio, United States. It is the only high school in the Archbold Area Schools district and is a Local school district. They are members of the Northwest Ohio Athletic League.

== Athletics ==
=== State championships ===
- Baseball - 2005
- Football – 1988
- Softball – 1982, 1984, 1986
- Girls volleyball – 1978, 1981, 1998
- Boys soccer - 2018

== Origin of the "Blue Streak" ==
The nickname "Blue Streaks" (more commonly seen today as Bluestreaks) was first used in 1933 by former Archbold coach M.A. Farber, who served as the head boys' basketball coach from 1930 until 1949. After watching the Sandusky Blue Streaks play, Farber adopted the name to his own team, knowing that they would likely never play each other because of the difference in school size. Prior to this, Archbold had been referred to as "the Archbold Team." In the 1910s, some local fathers started a movement to call the squad the "Archbold Germans" due to the German heritage of most of the players. However, this name never stuck on. It was changed around the time of WWII. The name Blue Streak also came from Cedar Point as one of the first rides in the park.
