= Defiance High School =

Location
- 1755 Palmer Drive; Defiance, Ohio 43512; United States; 41°15′49″N 84°21′35″W

Information
- Other name: DHS
- Type: Public high school
- Established: 1970
- School district: Defiance City Schools
- NCES School ID: 390438600841
- Principal: Jay Jerger
- Teaching staff: 44.18 (on an FTE basis)
- Grades: 9–12
- Enrollment: 713 (2023-2024)
- Student to teacher ratio: 16.14
- Colors: Royal Blue & White
- Athletics conference: Western Buckeye League
- Mascot: Bulldog
- Nickname: Bulldogs
- Website: www.defiancecityschools.org

Defiance High School (DHS) is a public high school in Defiance, Ohio, United States. It was established in 1970 and is part of the Defiance City Schools district.

== History ==
In 2021 the school board allowed the school to establish an eSports club.

== Ohio High School Athletic Association State Championships ==
- Boys Baseball – 1992, 2013, 2015, 2016
- Boys Football – 1997
- Boys Cross Country – 2013
- Boys Basketball – 2015

== Notable alumni ==
- Chad Billingsley, MLB player
- Justin Hancock, MLB player
- Scott Taylor, MLB pitcher
- Jon Niese, MLB player
- Craig Riedel, Politician
- Greg Kampe, College Basketball Coach (Oakland University)
