= Coldwater High School (Ohio) =

Public school in Coldwater, Ohio, US

Coordinates: 40.482°N 84.630°W

Location
- 310 N 2nd Street; Coldwater, Ohio 45828; United States

Information
- Type: Public
- Established: 1869
- School district: Coldwater Exempted Village
- School code: HNBFTS
- Principal: Jason Hemmelgarn
- Teaching staff: 23.00 (FTE)
- Grades: 9-12
- Student to teacher ratio: 16.70
- Colors: Orange and Black
- Athletics: Division III (Football VI)
- Athletics conference: Midwest Athletic Conference
- Mascot: Cavalier
- Website: http://coldwatercavs.org

Coldwater High School is a public high school located in Coldwater, Ohio. It is part of Coldwater Exempted Village Schools.

== Athletics ==
Athletic teams are known as the Cavaliers. The school competes in the Ohio High School Athletic Association as a member of the Midwest Athletic Conference. They have captured over 100 league championships in various MAC-sanctioned sports since 1973. The Cavaliers have a total of 31 team State Championships in various OHSAA sports. The Coldwater football team is in 2nd place for the most state titles (8) by a public school since the playoff system began in 1972. That is 7 behind fellow MAC member Marion Local who has 15 state football titles.

=== State championships ===
- Football - 2005, 2007, 2012, 2013, 2014, 2015, 2020, 2024
- Baseball - 1983, 1984, 1987, 1990, 1992, 2014, 2019
- Boys bowling - 2007, 2012, 2015, 2020
- Girls basketball – 1990, 1992
- Girls bowling - 2012, 2013, 2015, 2017, 2021
- Girls track and field – 1994, 1995, 1996, 2025
- Girls volleyball - 2024

=== State runners-up ===
- Football - 1998, 2000, 2009, 2010, 2011, 2016, 2021
- Baseball - 1977, 1991, 2004, 2018
- Boys basketball - 1999
- Boys bowling - 2016, 2022, 2023, 2026
- Girls bowling - 2014, 2018, 2020
- Girls softball - 1996
- Girls volleyball - 2017, 2022

== Notable alumni ==
- Ross Homan, former linebacker for the Ohio State Buckeyes and NFL draftee
- Steve Vagedes, former Arena Football League player
- Keith Wenning, professional football player in the National Football League (NFL)
