= Minster High School =

Location
- 100 East 7th Street; Minster, (Auglaize County), Ohio 45865; United States; 40°24′4″N 84°22′45″W

Information
- Type: Public, Coeducational high school
- School district: Minster Local Schools
- Superintendent: Josh Meyer
- Principal: Austin Kaylor
- Teaching staff: 25.45 (FTE)
- Grades: 7-12
- Student to teacher ratio: 15.40
- Campus size: small
- Campus type: High School
- Colors: Black and Orange
- Slogan: "Challenging today's students to become tomorrows leaders"
- Fight song: Across The Field
- Athletics conference: Midwest Athletic Conference
- Sports: Football, Cross Country, Volleyball, Golf, Basketball, Swim, Bowling, Baseball, Softball, Track and Field, Band
- Mascot: Wiley The Wildcat
- Team name: Wildcats
- Rival: New Bremen & Fort Loramie
- Newspaper: The Community Post
- Yearbook: Fanfare
- State Championships: 43
- Website: https://www.minsterschools.org/page/high-school

Minster High School is a public high school in Minster, Ohio, in northwestern Ohio. It is the only high school in the Minster Local Schools district. They are a member of the Midwest Athletic Conference.

== Athletics ==
Minster is a member of the Midwest Athletic Conference. Minster has won 43 team Ohio High School Athletic Association state tournaments, 5th best all-time in Ohio.

=== Ohio High School Athletic Association Championships ===
- Baseball - 2011, 2012, 2017, 2025
- Boys Golf - 2009
- Boys Track and Field - 2021
- Football - 1989, 2014, 2017
- Girls Basketball - 1998, 2004, 2018, 2019
- Girls Cross Country - 1982, 1999, 2000, 2001, 2004, 2005, 2008, 2009, 2010, 2016, 2017, 2018, 2019, 2021, 2022, 2023, 2024
- Girls Track and Field - 1976, 1977, 1978, 1979, 1980, 1982, 1985, 1989, 2001, 2002, 2003, 2004, 2018

=== OHSAA State Runner-Up ===
- Boys Golf - 2006
- Girls Cross Country - 1986, 1988, 1990, 2002, 2006, 2015, 2020, 2025
- Football - 2016
- Volleyball - 1977
- Girls Track and Field - 1975, 1981, 1983, 1984, 2015, 2016, 2017, 2026
- Softball - 2014
- Baseball - 2003

=== OHSAA State Final Four ===
- Football - 1988
- Volleyball - 1976, 2001
- Girls Cross Country - 1985 (4th), 2003 (3rd), 2007 (3rd), 2014 (4th)
- Boys Golf - 2005 (4th), 2008 (4th), 2019 (5th)
- Girls Basketball - 2010, 2020*, 2025
- Boys Basketball - 1952, 1965, 2005
- Baseball - 2019
- Softball- 2024
- Boys Track and Field - 1988 (3rd), 1994 (3rd), 2013 (4th)
- Girls Track and Field - 1986 (3rd), 1988 (4th), 2000 (3rd)

=== Minster MAC Championships ===
- Baseball (4): 2013, 2010, 2007, 1975
- Boys Basketball (2): 2021, 1975
- Girls Basketball (17): 2021, 2019, 2017, 2016, 2011, 2004, 2003, 2002, 1998, 1997, 1996, 1980, 1979, 1978, 1977, 1976, 1975
- Boys Cross Country (12): 2021, 2020, 2019, 2018, 2017, 2015, 2013, 2009, 2007, 2000, 1999, 1987, 1986, 1978
- Girls Cross Country (38): 2025, 2024, 2023, 2022, 2021, 2020, 2019, 2018, 2017, 2016, 2015, 2014, 2013, 2010, 2009, 2008, 2007, 2006, 2005, 2004, 2003, 2002, 2001, 2000, 1999, 1998, 1997, 1996, 1995, 1990, 1989, 1988, 1987, 1986, 1985, 1984, 1983, 1982
- Football (5): 2019, 1989, 1988, 1987, 1975
- Boys Golf (14): 2023, 2021, 2020, 2019, 2018, 2014, 2013, 2012, 2010, 2009, 2008, 2007, 2006, 2005, 1999
- Girls Golf (7): 2023, 2016, 2011, 2010, 2007, 2006, 2005
- Softball (5): 2023, 2021, 2019, 2018, 2014
- Boys Track and Field (16): 2021, 2016, 2015, 2014, 2012, 2011, 2010, 2001, 1999, 1998, 1997, 1996, 1994, 1992, 1988, 1987
- Girls Track and Field (34): 2024, 2023, 2022, 2021, 2018, 2017, 2016, 2015, 2014, 2013, 2004, 2003, 2002, 2001, 2000, 1999, 1998, 1992, 1991, 1989, 1988, 1987, 1986, 1985, 1984, 1983, 1982, 1981, 1980, 1979, 1978, 1977, 1976, 1975
- Volleyball (4): 1979, 1976, 1975, 1974
