= Russia High School (Russia, Ohio) =

Location
- 100 School St. Russia, Ohio, Ohio 45363; United States

Information
- School district: Russia Local Schools
- Staff: 5.11 (FTE)
- Grades: 7-12
- Enrollment: 205 (2023-2024)
- Average class size: 35
- Student to teacher ratio: 40.12
- Language: English
- Colors: Royal blue and yellow
- Athletics conference: Shelby County Athletic League
- Team name: Raiders
- Rival: Fort Loramie, Versailles
- Website: www.russiaschool.org

Russia High School /ˈruːʃiː/ (roo-shee) is a public high school in Russia, Ohio. It is the only high school in the Russia Local School district.

The Raiders wear royal blue and gold while they compete in the Shelby County Athletic League.

== Ohio High School Athletic Association State Championships ==
- Boys Baseball – 1971, 2022
- Boys Basketball - 2025

Baseball OHSAA State Runner Up: 1975, 2017, 2023

Boys Basketball OHSAA State Runner Up: 2002
