= Anna High School (Ohio) =

Location
- 1 McRill Way; Rural; Anna, Shelby County, Ohio 45302-0169; United States; 40.397°N 84.76°W

Information
- Funding type: Public
- Motto: Enter to learn, Leave to serve
- Established: 1869
- School district: Anna Local Schools
- NCES District ID: 3910004
- Superintendent: Joel Staudter
- CEEB code: 360170
- NCES School ID: 391000403683
- Principal: Derrick Purtee
- Teaching staff: 20.22 (FTE)
- Enrollment: 301 (2023-2024)
- Student to teacher ratio: 14.89
- Colors: Green and White
- Song: Alma Mater
- Fight song: Go Go, You Rockets
- Athletics conference: Shelby County Athletic League; Midwest Athletic Conference (Football)
- Mascot: Ronnie Rocket
- Nickname: Rockets
- Rival: Ft. Loramie
- Accreditation: North Central Association of Colleges and Schools
- Website: https://www.anna.k12.oh.us/o/ahs

Anna High School is a public high school in Anna, Ohio, United States. It is the only high school in the Anna Local Schools district, which is predominantly rural.

A large percentage of the school district's tax revenues are received from Honda. The Anna Rockets are primarily members of the Shelby County Athletic League, but are football members of the Midwest Athletic Conference.

== Athletics ==
Anna is a member of the Shelby County Athletic League. They have captured more than 75 league championships in various SCAL sports. The football program started in 2000 and was independent before joining the Cross County Conference in 2001. They were a member of the Cross County Conference for a total of 5 years, winning 2 league titles. The football team has been a member of the Midwest Athletic Conference since 2006, and they captured their first MAC title in 2018. In 2019, the Anna Rockets won their first football State Championship in both the school and Shelby County history by winning a state title.

=== OHSAA State Championships ===
- Boys Baseball – 1972, 1980
- Boys Cross Country – 1994, 1995
- Girls Volleyball – 2006
- Girls Basketball – 1981, 2011, 2013
- Girls Track and Field – 2017
- Boys Football – 2019

=== OHSAA State Runners-Up ===
- Boys Baseball – 1968
- Boys Track and Field – 2011
- Girls Basketball – 2012

=== OHSAA State Final Four ===
- Girls Volleyball – 1987, 2005
- Boys Basketball – 2008
- Boys Track and Field – 2015 (4th)
- Girls Basketball – 1982, 2020
