= Fort Loramie High School =

Location
- 600 E. Park St. (PO Box 290); Fort Loramie, Ohio 45845; United States
- Coordinates: 40°20′39.4″N 84°21′45.4″W

Information
- School district: Fort Loramie Local Schools
- Staff: 18.90 (FTE)
- Grades: 7-12
- Enrollment: 348 (2023-2024)
- Student to teacher ratio: 18.41
- Language: English
- Colors: Red & Black
- Athletics conference: Shelby County Athletic League; Northwest Conference (football only)
- Team name: Redskins
- Website: http://www.loramie.k12.oh.us/Default.aspx

Fort Loramie High School is a public high school in Fort Loramie, Ohio in Shelby County. It is the only high school in the Fort Loramie School district. The high school is located at 600 East Park Street. This building houses students in grades 7–12. Students in grades K-6 attend the Fort Loramie Elementary School which is located at 35 Elm Street. The district serves between 780 and 820 students in any given school year. The motto for the district and the community is: "A Great Place to Learn and a Great Place to Live!" The mascot is the Redskin and the school colors are red and black. They primarily compete in the Shelby County Athletic League, but play football in the Northwest Conference.

The Board of Education for the Fort Loramie Schools consists of five people. There are approximately 26 faculty members at the Junior High/High School.

The district provides students in grades 9–12 with nearly 90 course offerings. There is a variety of extracurricular clubs and activities including National Honor Society, History Club, FCCLA, Academia, Science Olympiad, and Spanish Club. Students can also participate in the following sports: basketball, baseball, football, volleyball, track, cross country, golf, softball, bowling, and cheerleading.

== Athletics ==
=== Ohio High School Athletic Association State Championships ===
- Boys Baseball – 2007, 2010, 2018
- Boys Basketball – 1977, 1987, 1993
- Girls Cross Country – 2002
- Girls Basketball – 2013, 2015, 2021, 2024
- Girls Volleyball – 2014, 2024
- Boys Cross Country – 2016, 2018

== Notable alumni ==
- Jared Hoying – Former outfielder for the Texas Rangers and in the Korean Baseball Organization.

== See also ==
- Native American mascot controversy
- Sports teams named Redskins
