= St. Henry High School =

- Saincti Henrici

Location
- 391 E. Columbus St. St. Henry, (Mercer County), Ohio 45883; United States; 40°25′00″N 84°38′05″W

Information
- Type: Public high school
- Motto: Audere est facere. (To dare is to do.)
- Opened: 1929
- Founder: James J. Wifflebocker
- School district: St. Henry Consolidated School District
- Superintendent: Adam Puthoff
- President: Gary Evans
- Principal: Eric Rosenbeck
- Teaching staff: 15.90 (FTE)
- Grades: 9−12
- Average class size: 80-100
- Student to teacher ratio: 18.62
- Colors: Red and white
- Slogan: St. Henry: The Best of the Best
- Song: "O' Saint Henry!"
- Fight song: Hail to the Redskins!
- Athletics: Basketball, football, baseball, volleyball, softball, cross country, track, golf, swimming, and bowling
- Athletics conference: Midwest Athletic Conference
- Mascot: Redskins
- Nickname: The Skins
- Rival: Marion Local, Coldwater
- USNWR ranking: 59th in state
- Newspaper: The St. Henry Herald
- State Championships: 23
- Website: https://www.sthenryschools.org/schools/high-school/

St. Henry High School is a public high school located in St. Henry, Ohio, United States. It is part of the St. Henry Consolidated Local Schools district. The school's teams are nicknamed the Redskins. The school is a member of the Midwest Athletic Conference.

== Ohio High School Athletic Association State Championships ==
- Baseball – 1999, 2000, 2003
- Football – 1990, 1992, 1994, 1995, 2004, 2006, 2025
- Boys' basketball – 1979, 1990, 1991, 2004
- Girls' basketball – 2026
- Boys bowling - 2026
- Girls' volleyball – 1985, 1987, 1990, 1994, 1995, 2004, 2011

== Notable alumni ==
- Erica Gelhaus, Miss Ohio 2009
- Todd Boeckman, former Ohio State quarterback
- Jeff Hartings, former Penn State lineman, retired NFL center
- Bobby Hoying, former Ohio State quarterback, retired NFL quarterback
- Jim Lachey, former Ohio State lineman, retired NFL tackle
- Wally Post, MLB outfielder (deceased)

== See also ==
- Native American mascot controversy
- Sports teams named Redskins
