= Northeastern Buckeye Conference =

Defunct high school athletic conference in Ohio

Coordinates: 40°50′N 81°10′W

The Northeastern Buckeye Conference was an Ohio High School Athletic Association (OHSAA) high school athletic conference that comprised eight high schools in Carroll, Columbiana, Mahoning and Stark Counties in Ohio that operated from 1989 until 2018.

== All Members ==
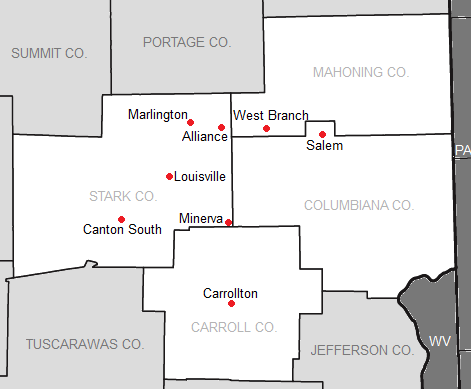
Northeastern Buckeye Conference Members prior to folding

School	Nickname	Location	Colors	Tenure	Notes
Alliance	Aviators	Alliance	Red, Columbia Blue	2005-2018	Left for EBC
Dover	Tornadoes	Dover	Crimson, Gray	1989-1993	Left for the ECOL
Carrollton	Warriors	Carrollton	Black, White	1989-2018	Left for EBC
Canton South	Wildcats	Canton	Red and Gray	1990-2018	Left for EBC
Louisville	Leopards	Louisville	Blue and white	1990-2018	Left to Independent
Marlington	Dukes	Lexington	Orange, Black  	1989-2018	Left for EBC
Minerva	Lions	Minerva	Crimson, Gray  	1989-2018	Left for EBC
Northwest	Indians	Lawrence	Red, White, & Gray	1989-2011	Left to be independent.
Salem	Quakers	Salem	Red, Black  	2011-2018	Left for EBC
Springfield	Spartans	Lakemore	Red, Gray	1993-2005	Left for the PTC
West Branch	Warriors	Beloit	Green, White  	1989-2018	Left for EBC

== History ==
The NBC was established in September 1988 and began league play in the fall of 1989. The six founding members were Carrollton, Dover, Marlington, Minerva, Northwest, and West Branch. Due to contractual obligations to the Federal League, Canton South and Louisville could not compete until the following year (1990–91).

Dover, one of the leagues founding members had left for the East Central Ohio League after the 1992-93 school year and was replaced by Springfield in 1993-94.

Springfield left after 11 seasons in the league in 2004-05, for the newly created Portage Trail Conference. Alliance joined shortly after in 2005-06.

In anticipation of having to discontinue sports due to a series of levy failures, Northwest left the conference after the 2010-11 school year. Salem joined the conference as a replacement starting the 2011-12 school year.

In December 2015, discussions began between members of the Northeastern Buckeye Conference to create a new league that didn't include member school Louisville due to their enrollment size compared to the rest of the league. In February 2016, the Northeastern Buckeye Conference officially disbanded, the remaining members in the league at the time (Alliance, Canton South, Carrollton, Marlington, Minerva, Salem, and West Branch) voted to form the Eastern Buckeye Conference that would begin play in the fall of 2018.

== See also ==
- Ohio High School Athletic Conferences
