= Federal League (OHSAA) =

High school athletic conference in Ohio

Coordinates: 40°56′N 81°27′W

The Federal League is an Ohio High School Athletic Association athletic conference that began conference play in 1964 and includes schools from Stark and Summit counties in Ohio.

== Current members ==
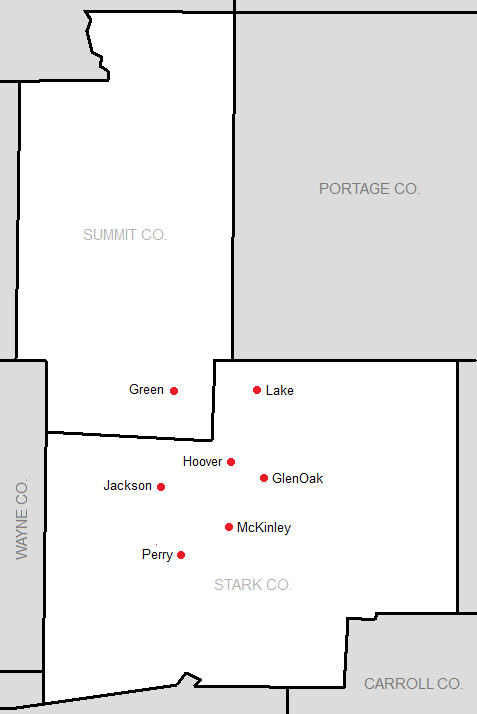
Federal League Alignment

School	Nickname	Location	Colors	Tenure	Notes
McKinley	Bulldogs	Canton	Red, black	2003-	Football joined conference in 2004
GlenOak	Golden Eagles	Plain Township	Forest green, vegas gold	1975-	
Green	Bulldogs	Green	Orange, black	2015-	
Hoover	Vikings	North Canton	Black, orange	1968-	
Jackson	Polar Bears	Jackson Township	Purple, gold	1964-	
Lake	Blue Streaks	Uniontown	Blue, red, white	1987-	
Perry	Panthers	Perry Township	Black, gold, white	1964-	

== Former members ==
School	Nickname	Location	Colors	Tenure	Notes
Austintown Fitch	Falcons	Austintown	Navy and scarlet	2003-2011	Football joined conference in 2004, left for the All-American Conference
Alliance	Aviators	Alliance	Red, columbia blue	1983-2003	Left for Metro
Boardman	Spartans	Boardman	Maroon and white	2003-2014	Football joined conference in 2004, left for the All-American Conference
Canton South	Wildcats	Canton	Red and gray	1964-1990	Left for Northeastern Buckeye Conference
Fairless	Falcons	Brewster	Navy blue, silver, and white	1964-1976	Left for All-Ohio Conference
Glenwood	Eagles	Canton	Red and blue	1968-1975	Consolidated with Oakwood
Louisville	Leopards	Louisville	Blue and white	1968-1990	Left for Northeastern Buckeye Conference
Marlington	Dukes	Lexington	Orange, black	1964-1985	Left for Senate Athletic League
New Philadelphia	Quakers	New Philadelphia	Red and black	1987-1997	Left for East Central
Oakwood	Golden Raiders	Canton	Forest green, vegas gold	1968-1975	Consolidated with Glenwood to become GlenOak
Sandy Valley	Cardinals	Magnolia	Red and gray	1964-1968	Left for Senate
Timken	Trojans	Canton	Blue and gold	1987-1995	Left to be independent
Wooster	Generals	Wooster	Blue and gold	1987-2003	Left for Ohio Cardinal

== History ==
The Federal League began competition in 1964 with Canton South High School, Fairless High School, Glenwood High School, Jackson High School, Marlington High School, Perry High School, and Sandy Valley High School as charter members.

In 1968, Sandy Valley departed for the Senate Athletic League. That same year, the conference expanded with the additions of Louisville High School, North Canton Hoover High School, and Oakwood High School. Further changes occurred in 1975 when Fairless left to join the All-Ohio Conference. That same year, GlenOak High School joined the league following the consolidation of Oakwood and Glenwood high schools.

Expansion continued during the 1980s. Alliance High School joined the conference in 1983, followed by Marlington in 1985 after a brief departure, and Lake High School in 1987. By 1988, membership had grown to ten schools, prompting the league to divide into two divisions: the American Division and the National Division. The realignment coincided with the addition of New Philadelphia High School, Timken High School, and Wooster High School.

The conference returned to a single-division format in 1990 after the departures of Canton South and Louisville, both of which joined the Northeastern Buckeye Conference. Additional membership changes followed during the 1990s. Timken left the conference in 1995 to compete as an independent; the school later consolidated with Canton McKinley High School in 2015. In 1997, New Philadelphia departed for the East Central Ohio League.

Significant realignment occurred in 2003 when Alliance and Wooster left the conference to join the Metro Athletic Conference and the Ohio Cardinal Conference, respectively. That same year, Austintown Fitch High School, Boardman High School, and Canton McKinley joined the league for all sports except football; their football programs joined the conference the following year in 2004.

In 2011, Austintown Fitch left the conference to join the All-American Conference. Although Fitch initially sought to remain a football-only member of the Federal League, it ultimately departed the conference in all sports. Further changes occurred in the 2010s. In 2013, Green High School announced it would join the Federal League beginning with the 2015–16 school year. Meanwhile, Boardman left the conference in 2014 to join the All-American Conference.

== See also ==
- Ohio High School Athletic Conferences
