= All-American Conference =

OHSAA-sanctioned league created in 2003

The All-American Conference is a high school athletic conference made of up of schools from Trumbull, Mahoning, and Stark Counties in Ohio. They compete in the Ohio High School Athletic Association.

== Members ==
School	Location	Nickname	Colors	Tenure	Notes
Austintown Fitch	Austintown	Falcons	Blue, red	2011–	Independent in football since 2019
Boardman	Boardman	Spartans	Maroon, white	2014–	Independent in football since 2019
Canfield	Canfield	Cardinals	Red, black	2008–	Independent in football since 2019
Howland	Howland	Tigers	Orange, black	2008–	In Eastern Buckeye Conference for football
Louisville	Louisville	Leopards	Blue, white	2026–	Independent in football
Warren G. Harding	Warren	Raiders	Black, gold	2014–	Independent in football since 2019

== Former members ==
School	Location	Nickname	Colors	Tenure	Notes
Beaver Local^{1}	East Liverpool	Beavers	Red, white	2008–2013	left for Buckeye 8 Athletic League
Brookfield	Brookfield	Warriors	Blue, gold	2014–2020	left for Mahoning Valley Athletic Conference
Campbell Memorial	Campbell	Red Devils	Red, black	2008–2020	left for Mahoning Valley Athletic Conference
Champion	Champion	Golden Flashes	Purple, gold	2008–2020	left for Mahoning Valley Athletic Conference
Crestview	Columbiana	Rebels	Black, gold	2017–2020	left for Mahoning Valley Athletic Conference
East	Youngstown	Panthers/Golden Bears^{2}	Navy blue, gold	2014–2019	left for Steel Valley Conference
Edgewood	Ashtabula	Warriors	Red, gray	2014–2019	left for Chagrin Valley Conference
Hubbard	Hubbard	Eagles	Royal blue, white	2008–2018	left for Northeast 8 Conference
Girard	Girard	Indians	Red, black	2008–2018	left for Northeast 8 Conference
Jefferson	Jefferson	Falcons	Red, black	2011–2018	left for Northeast 8 Conference
LaBrae	Leavittsburg	Vikings	Crimson, gray	2008–2020	left for Mahoning Valley Athletic Conference
Lakeside	Ashtabula	Dragons	Green, gold	2015–2019	left for Chagrin Valley Conference
Lakeview	Cortland	Bulldogs	Blue, gray	2008–2018	left for Northeast 8 Conference
Liberty	Liberty	Leopards	Maroon, gold	2008–2020	left for Mahoning Valley Athletic Conference
Newton Falls	Newton Falls	Tigers	Orange, black	2008–2020	left for Mahoning Valley Athletic Conference
Niles McKinley	Niles	Red Dragons	Red, blue	2008–2018	left for Northeast 8 Conference
Poland Seminary	Poland	Bulldogs	Blue, white	2008–2018	left for Northeast 8 Conference
Salem	Salem	Quakers	Red, black	2008–2011	left for Northeastern Buckeye Conference
Struthers	Struthers	Wildcats	Red, white	2008–2018	left for Northeast 8 Conference

- ^{1}Beaver Local maintained membership in the Ohio Valley Athletic Conference during their tenure in the AAC.
- ^{2}Youngstown East changed their mascot and school colors in 2017.

== History ==
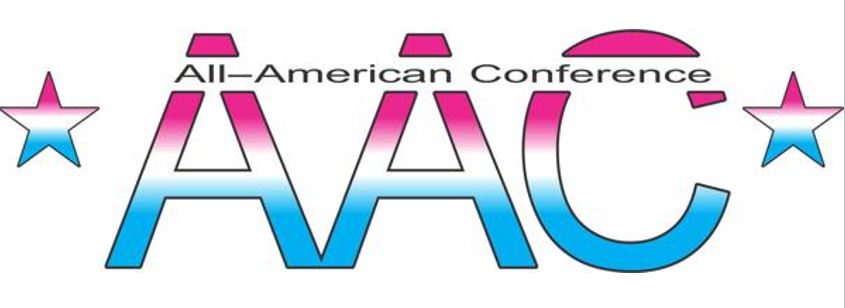
AAC logo

The All-American Conference (AAC) was formed in 2008 following the merger of the Trumbull Athletic Conference and the Metro Athletic Conference. From its inception, the AAC utilized a tiered alignment system based primarily on school enrollment to maintain competitive balance. At various points, the conference included four tiers: Red, Gold, White, and Blue, which grouped schools with similar student populations while still maintaining conference-wide competition in many sports. This structure allowed large Division I schools to compete in the same league as smaller Division III and IV programs while minimizing competitive disparities.

During the early 2010s, the AAC became one of the largest high school athletic conferences in Ohio, eventually expanding to more than 20 member schools across its tiers. Schools such as Austintown Fitch, Warren G. Harding, Canfield, Poland Seminary, and Howland represented some of the conference’s larger programs, while schools such as Champion, LaBrae, and Newton Falls competed among the smaller-enrollment tiers.

In 2017, conference administrators voted to restructure the league’s alignment beginning with the 2019–20 school year in response to changing enrollment numbers and new competitive balance factors introduced by the OHSAA. The proposal reduced the number of tiers in most sports and reorganized several schools within the conference structure.

Major realignment occurred following the 2017–18 school year when several mid-sized schools left the conference to establish the Northeast 8 Athletic Conference. Founding members of the new conference included Lakeview, Niles, Girard, Hubbard, Struthers, Poland, and Jefferson, and South Range.

Further changes followed in 2019 when Lakeside, Edgewood, and East High School departed the AAC to join the Chagrin Valley Conference and Steel Valley Conference, respectively. These departures further reduced the size of the conference and contributed to additional restructuring.

In 2020, the schools that made up the AAC’s Blue Tier announced their withdrawal from the conference to form the Mahoning Valley Athletic Conference alongside former members of the Inter-Tri County League. The move significantly altered the league’s structure and left the conference primarily composed of larger schools in the region.

Despite the departures, the AAC continues to operate, removing the tier system after 2020. In July 2025, Louisville announced they will join the conference beginning with the 2026–27 school year after previously competing as an independent program. In May 2026, Salem, West Branch, and Alliance announced that they have applied to join the conference.

== See also ==
- Ohio High School Athletic Conferences
