= Defunct Ohio high school athletic conferences =

Since the OHSAA began basketball competition in 1922–23, many schools have decided to band together in conferences to help scheduling, added competition for titles and bragging rights, and oftentimes help determine seeding for the early rounds of the state tournament. Some conferences had been established for football-playing schools, and as schools added other sports, adopted those under the conference banner once enough schools started playing. Smaller schools often picked up basketball first, adding other sports later, and combined with other in-county schools to form County conferences (or leagues, as they were usually referred to in the early days). Most of these leagues were formed in the 1920s and early 1930s after the tournament was started, which is why quite a few lack a definitive starting date at this point in time.

Many of the conferences listed in this section were decimated by massive school consolidation between the 1940s and early 1970s. Where conferences had numerous small schools located within the same county before, they were left with fewer schools of varying sizes, forcing their members to look for (or create) conferences with other schools of similar size and athletic offerings. Conference membership in Ohio is voluntary, rather than assigned by the state association like in some states. While this ensures that many rivalries stay intact regardless of classification changes, it also means schools can choose to change conferences pending acceptance into a different conference, or in rare cases, can be forced out of a conference, depending on the rules set up by that particular league.

== Central Region ==
This region includes the counties of Delaware, Franklin, Knox, Licking, Madison, Marion, Morrow, and Union.

== East/Southeast Regions ==
The East region includes the counties of Belmont, Carroll, Coshocton, Guernsey, Harrison, Holmes, Jefferson, Monroe, Morgan, Muskingum, Noble, Tuscarawas, and Washington. The Southeast region includes the counties of Adams, Athens, Fairfield, Fayette, Gallia, Highland, Hocking, Jackson, Lawrence, Meigs, Perry, Pickaway, Pike, Ross, Scioto, and Vinton. Due to the number of conferences in each region, they are combined into one article.

== Northeast Region ==
This region includes the counties of Ashland, Ashtabula, Columbiana, Cuyahoga, Geauga, Lake, Lorain, Mahoning, Medina, Portage, Stark, Summit, Trumbull, and Wayne.

== Northwest Region ==
This region includes the counties of Allen, Auglaize, Crawford, Defiance, Erie, Fulton, Hancock, Hardin, Henry, Huron, Lucas, Mercer, Ottawa, Paulding, Putnam, Richland, Sandusky, Seneca, Van Wert, Williams, Wood, and Wyandot.

== Southwest Region ==
This region includes the counties of Brown, Butler, Champaign, Clark, Clermont, Clinton, Darke, Greene, Hamilton, Logan, Miami, Montgomery, Preble, Shelby, and Warren.

== See also ==
- Ohio High School Athletic Association
- Ohio High School Athletic Conferences
