= Filip Filipović =

Filip Filipović may refer to:

- Filip Filipović (politician) (1878–1938), Serbian communist politician
- Filip Filipović (American football) (born 1977), American football player of Serbian descent
- Filip Filipović (water polo) (born 1987), Serbian water polo player
