= Alliance City School District =

School district in Ohio, United States

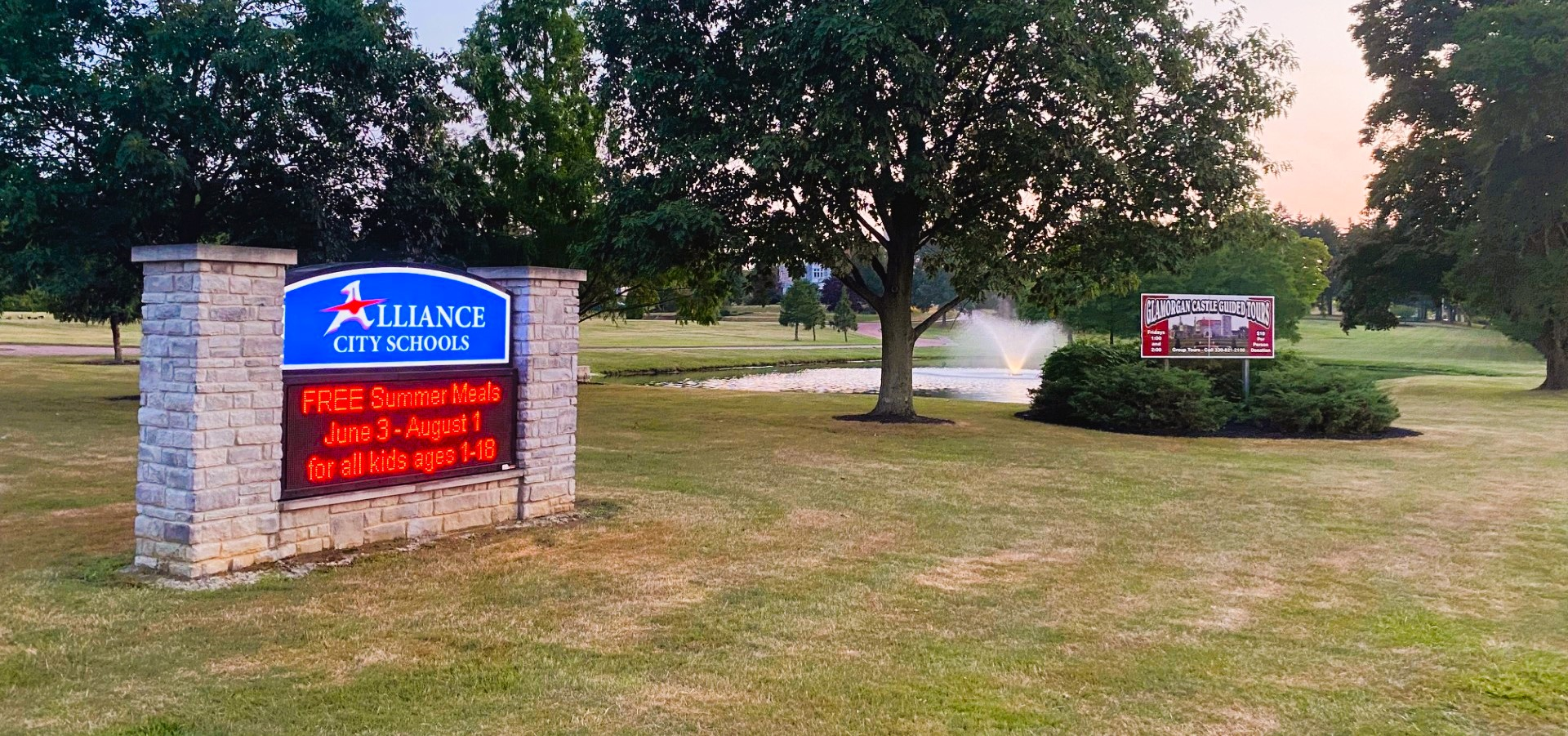

Address
- 500 Glamorgan Street Alliance, Ohio, 44601; United States
- Coordinates: 40°54′48″N 81°06′29″W

District information
- Type: Public
- Grades: PK–12
- Superintendent: Rob Gress
- Schools: 6
- NCES District ID: 3904349

Students and staff
- Students: 3,019 (2025–2026)
- Teachers: 151.00 (on an FTE basis) (2025–2026)
- Staff: 400.19 (on an FTE basis) (2025–2026)
- Student–teacher ratio: 19.99 (2025–2026)
- Athletic conference: Eastern Buckeye Conference
- District mascot: Aviator (Goose) & Flying Squirrel (Chippy)

Other information
- Website: www.alliancecityschools.org

Alliance City Schools is a school district located in Stark County, Ohio, United States. There is one elementary school containing grades 2–3, and one early learning school containing only pre-school and kindergarten, one middle school, and one high school, and one intermediate school.

A portion of the district extends into Columbiana County.

== Alliance High School ==
Alliance High School is a public high school in Alliance, Ohio. It is the only high school in the Alliance City Schools district. The current facility is the third building to be known as Alliance High School. Currently it houses grades 9–12 with an enrollment of a thousand students. The sports teams for the high school are known as the Aviators in respect for the airplane production plants in the area in the 1920s. These included Taylorcraft and ArgoHess to name a few. They are in the Eastern Buckeye Conference.

== Notable alumni ==
- Jack Warner, Former MLB player (Chicago Cubs)
- Len Dawson, Former NFL player (Kansas City Chiefs)
