= North Canton City School District =

School district in Ohio, United States

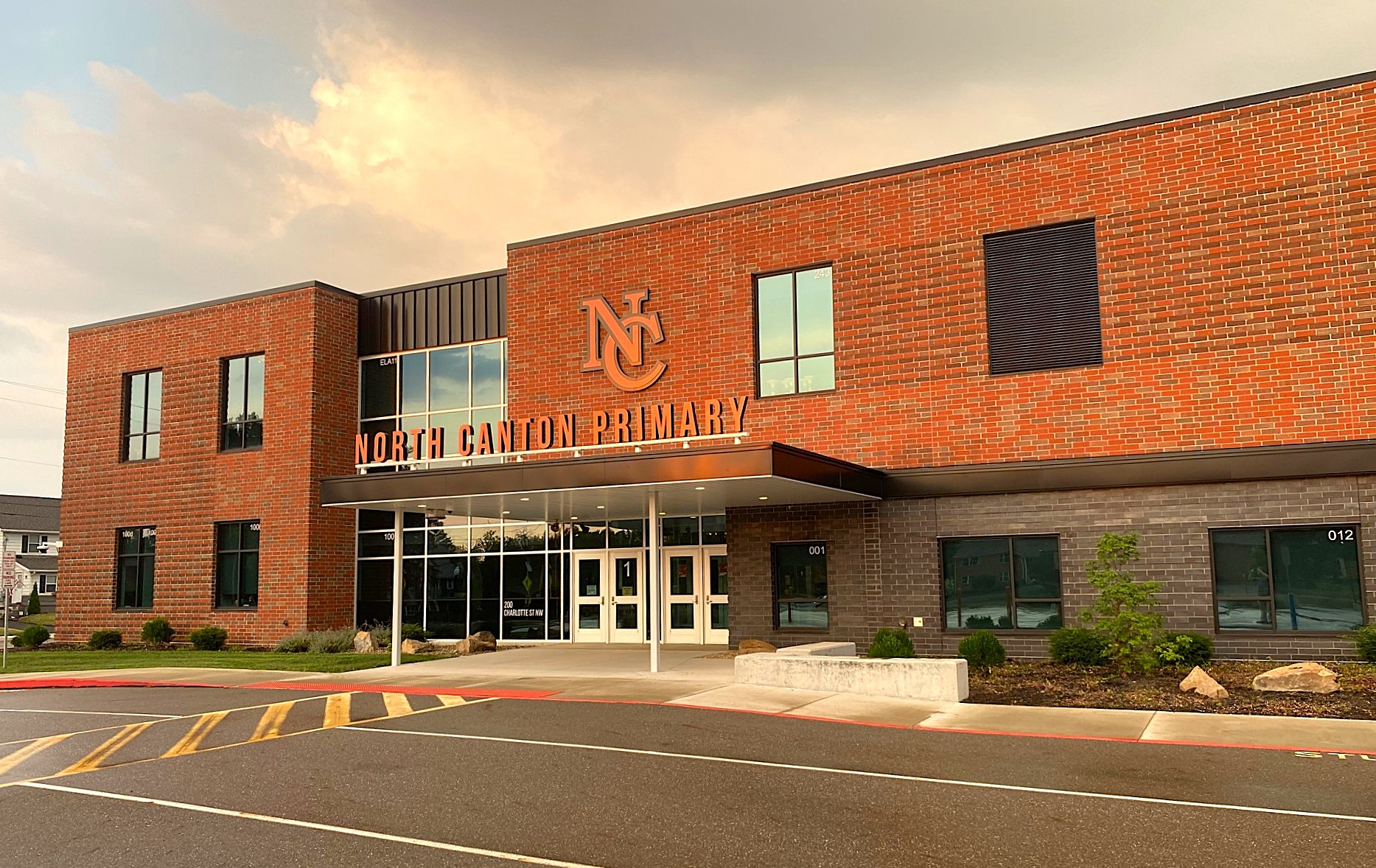

Address
- 525 7th Street Northeast North Canton, Ohio, 44720; United States

District information
- Type: Public
- Mottoes: "Ignite a passion for learning"
- Grades: PK–12
- Superintendent: Jeff Wendorf
- Schools: 4
- NCES District ID: 3904450

Students and staff
- Students: 4,334 (2024–2025)
- Teachers: 248.32 (on an FTE basis) (2024–2025)
- Staff: 673.49 (on an FTE basis) (2024–2025)
- Student–teacher ratio: 17.45 (2024–2025)
- Athletic conference: Federal League
- District mascot: Vikings
- Colors: Orange and black

Other information
- Website: www.northcantonschools.org

North Canton City School District is a public school district serving students in North Canton, Ohio, United States.

The district serves the city of North Canton, except for some small portions that are instead served by the Plain Local School District. The district also includes most of the southwestern quarter of Lake Township.

The district schools include an early childhood center for preschool, North Canton Primary School for students in grades K-2, and North Canton Intermediate School for students in grades 3-5. Students from grades 6-8 attend North Canton Middle School, and those in grades 9-12 attend Hoover High School.

The district's colors are orange and black, and the mascot is Victor Viking. The school's teams are known as the "Vikings" or "Vikes".

In 2023, two new schools were opened. North Canton Primary serves all PK-2 students, and North Canton Intermediate serves all grade 3-5 students. The five schools that will no longer be needed will be demolished or used for other purposes. As of the summer of 2025, phase 2 of the Facilities Project had started, which consisted of building a new middle school. The school is on track to open in the fall of 2027.

== School board ==
The North Canton School Board consists of five members: President Jessica Stroia, Andrea Ziarko, Alyssa Plakas, Dr. Bob Roden, and Lindsey Wyckoff. Each member is elected to serve a four-year term by the residents of the North Canton City School District.

== Past superintendents ==
- C. F. McFadden, 1925
- Thomas G. Denton, 1925–1938
- Raymond E. Trachsel, 1938–1954
- E. R. Malone, 1954–1969
- Dr. James E. Brandau, 1969–1987
- Dr. Robert P. Roden, 1987–1995
- Thomas Shoup, 1995–2004
- Michael Gallina, 2004–2012
- Michael Hartenstein, 2012–2016
- Jeff Wendorf, 2016–2025
