= Louisville High School (Ohio) =

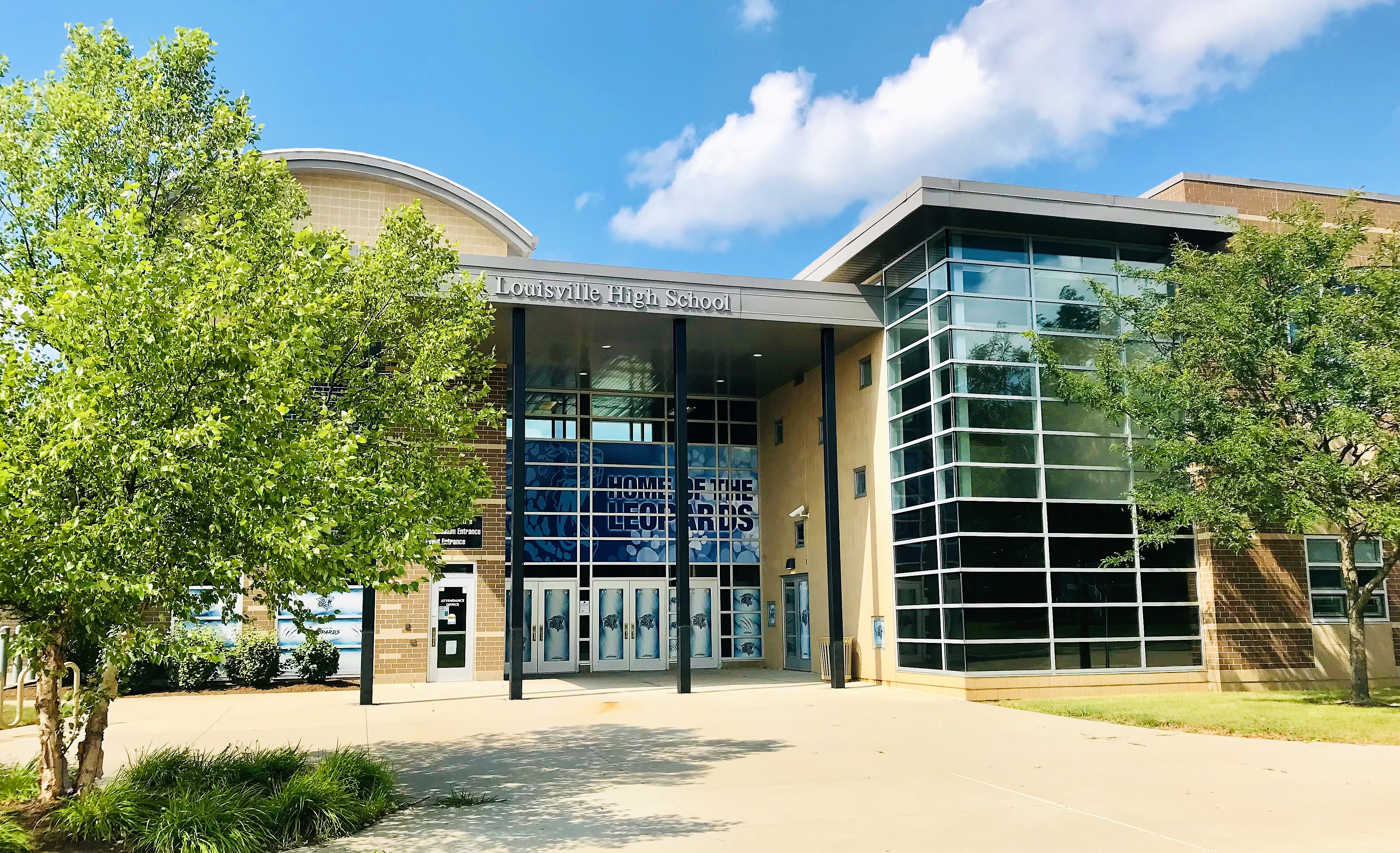

Location
- 1201 South Nickelplate Street; Louisville, Ohio 44641; United States; 40°49′46″N 81°15′09″W

Information
- School district: Louisville City School District
- Principal: Gary Tausch
- Grades: 9–12
- Enrollment: 778 (2023–2024)
- Colors: Blue and white
- Song: "My Louisville"
- Athletics conference: Independent
- Team name: Leopards
- Rivals: Hoover High School; Minerva High School
- Publication: Paw Prints
- Yearbook: Mirror
- Website: lhs.louisvillecityschools.org

Louisville High School is a public high school located in Louisville, Ohio, United States. It is the only high school in the Louisville City School District. It serves all of the city of Louisville and the majority of the surrounding Nimishillen Township.

== History ==
The first schoolhouse within Louisville was a one-room log cabin located on the corner of Nickelplate and Main Streets. It was built in the 1840s and was replaced by a two-room brick edifice in the 1850s. This new school was located on the northeast corner of Mill and Broad Streets. In 1872, Louisville's seat of learning was moved again to another two-room brick building, located upon South Chapel Street. Louisville's students moved to a larger, four-classroom building on the corner of Mill and Gorgas Street in 1876, where Louisville's current City Hall building now stands.

In 1924, Louisville High School again moved to a much larger campus, which included ten classrooms, an auditorium, a gymnasium, and a library. This school was located on the corner of Gorgas and Mill Streets, just down the street from the previously used school building. A third floor was added to the building in 1930, and a bussing system for the students began in 1936. In 1949, the school built an addition which linked the school to the Louisville City School District Administration Building on Main Street. Louisville High School remained at this location until 1967, when it became solely a middle school. Louisville Middle School was housed within this building until 2004, when a new middle school was constructed on South Chapel Street. The old building was demolished in 2009.

The construction of Louisville High School's present campus commenced in 1964, and the new building opened in 1967. Additions and renovations to LHS occurred in 2004 and 2011.

== Academics ==
Louisville was a 2008 Bronze Medal Winner of America's Best High Schools, given by the U.S. News & World Report.

== Athletics ==
Louisville High School formed its first athletic club in 1916, and the boys' basketball team became a member of the Ohio High School Athletic Association in 1922. The OHSAA's records for the school's football team date back to the 1924 season.

Louisville's first conference membership was with the former Stark County League. In 1932, Louisville became a charter member of the Tri County League (which later became a part of the Inter-Tri County League). By 1938, Louisville's athletic teams had become known as the "Blue Raiders". Louisville adopted its current athletics nickname, the "Leopards", in 1948. The name change was due to problems with designing a Blue Raider mascot.

During the 1960s, the Louisville Leopards football team achieved a particularly high level of dominance. From the period of 1962–1966, the Leopards' record was 48-1-1. This includes an unbeaten streak of 38 games, which is still the fourteenth-longest in Ohio high school football history. These teams were led by head coaches Gaylord ("Hap") Lillick from 1962–1964 and Paul Starkey from 1965–1966. Star players included future Notre Dame and NFL running back Bob Gladieux and future Ohio State linebacker Mark Stier.

In order to find a more competitive league, Louisville High School left the Tri County League after the 1966–1967 school year, moving to the Federal League. When the league split into two divisions in 1988, the Leopards became a member of the National ("Small-School") Division. By this time, Louisville's sports teams had mostly begun to struggle against Federal League competition, as their enrollment was among the smallest of the league's schools. In 1989, Louisville High School decided to leave the Federal League for the newly formed Northeastern Buckeye Conference. However, due to league scheduling commitments, the Leopard sports teams did not begin NBC league play until 1990. On February 5, 2016, it was announced that the Northeastern Buckeye Conference would disband, as all of Louisville's league rivals agreed to form a new league (the Eastern Buckeye Conference) without Louisville, starting with the 2018–2019 school year, which caused Louisville's athletic teams to compete independent of a league.

As of the end of the 2016 season, Louisville High School's football team was the twenty-fifth winningest high school program in the state of Ohio. Their 600th win came in a 51-0 win over West Branch on October 3, 2014. As of the end of the 2017 season, the Leopards' all-time record stands at 626 wins, 284 losses, and 35 ties.

=== Rivalries ===
Louisville High School maintains long-standing sports rivalries with the North Canton Hoover Vikings and the Minerva High School Lions. Louisville and Hoover were Federal League-mates from 1968 until 1989. Louisville and Minerva were both charter Tri County League members in 1932, and remained league rivals until 1967. When the Leopards joined the NBC in 1990, Louisville and Minerva once again became leaguemates, which lasted until June 2018 when the NBC dissolved.

Louisville and Hoover have played every year in football since 1924, with the Leopards leading the all-time series, 55-35-5. Louisville and Minerva's football rivalry also dates back to 1924. For many years, the two teams met during the tenth, and final, week of the OHSAA football regular season. The Leopards also lead that series, 65-20-5.

=== State championships ===
- Boys' cross country – 2010
- Girls' softball - 2019
- Dual-Team wrestling- 2020
- Boys' basketball- 2025

== Arts ==
=== OMEA State Marching Band Competition ===
The Louisville High School Marching Band ("The Pride of Louisville") has qualified for the OMEA State Finals every year since 1985 with a record of 28 Superior (I) and 11 Excellent (II) ratings.
