= Brandon Todd =

Brandon Todd may refer to:

- Brandon Todd (basketball)
- Brandon Todd (politician)
