= Poland Local School District =

School district in Ohio, United States

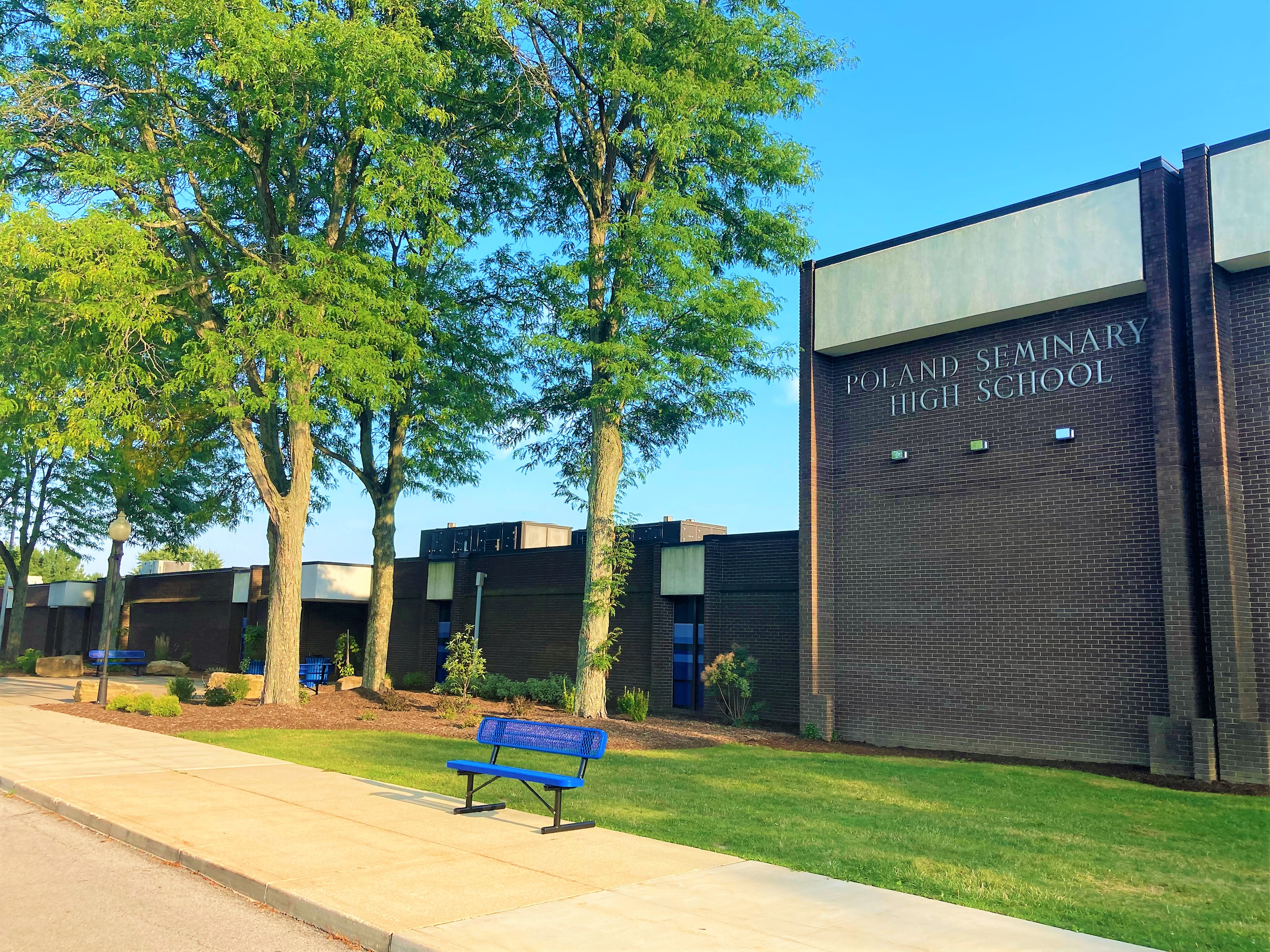
- Poland High School entrance

Address
- 3030 Dobbins Rd Poland, Ohio, 44514; United States

District information
- Type: Public
- Grades: PK–12
- Accreditation: Ohio Department of Education
- NCES District ID: 3904834

Students and staff
- Enrollment: 1,755 (2024–25)
- Staff: 97.66 (FTE)
- Student–teacher ratio: 17.97
- District mascot: Bulldogs
- Colors: Blue and White

Other information
- Website: www.polandbulldogs.com

The Poland Local School District is a school district located in southern Mahoning County, Ohio. It serves students in grades Pre-K through 12 living in Poland, Ohio as well as portions of Boardman, Beaver and Youngstown. the district consists of one high school, one middle school, one elementary and one preschool. All buildings and offices are located in Poland, Ohio.

== History ==
Poland Local Schools was formed in the early 1900s. Although the current high building was built in 1972, Poland Seminary High School owes its name to an earlier institution, Poland Seminary, which was one of the first private colleges to admit women. In the early 1900s, the institution was deeded to The Poland Schools for $1.00 with the stipulation that it forever be called "Poland Seminary". This former institution matriculated US President William McKinley, and the present high school claims McKinley as an alumnus. In 1999, students from the high school visited the Ohio Seventh District Court of Appeals.

== Schools ==
Schools within the district includes:

=== High school ===
- Poland Seminary High School

=== Middle school ===
- Poland Middle School

=== Elementary school ===
- McKinley Elementary School

=== Preschool ===
- Dobbins Early Learning Center
