= Girard City School District =

Location
- 100 W Main St Ste 2 Girard, Ohio 44420; United States
- Coordinates: 41°09′18″N 80°42′10″W

Information
- Type: Public
- Established: 1861
- Teaching staff: 106.01 (FTE)
- Grades: K-12
- Enrollment: 1,489 (2024-25)
- Student to teacher ratio: 14.05
- Colors: Red and black
- Team name: Indians
- Website: girardcityschools.org

The Girard City School District is a school district located in Girard, Trumbull County, Ohio United States. The school district serves one high school, one junior high school, one middle school, and one elementary school. The districts office is located at 100 W Main St Ste 2 Girard OH, 44420

== History ==
Girard's first high school was opened in 1861 as Girard Union High School; its current variation was originally opened in the 1920s. It was closed following the construction of its current junior/senior high school building in 2010.

The Girard City School District at one point has six neighborhood elementary schools, the consolidation and closures of those schools led to one lone elementary school in the district prospect elementary.

== Schools ==
=== High School ===
- Girard Senior High School

=== Middle Schools ===
- Girard Junior High School
- Girard Intermediate School

=== Elementary Schools ===
- Prospect Elementary School

=== Former Schools ===
- Girard Union High School
- Maple School
- North Ave School
- Washington School
