= Louisville City School District =

School district in Ohio

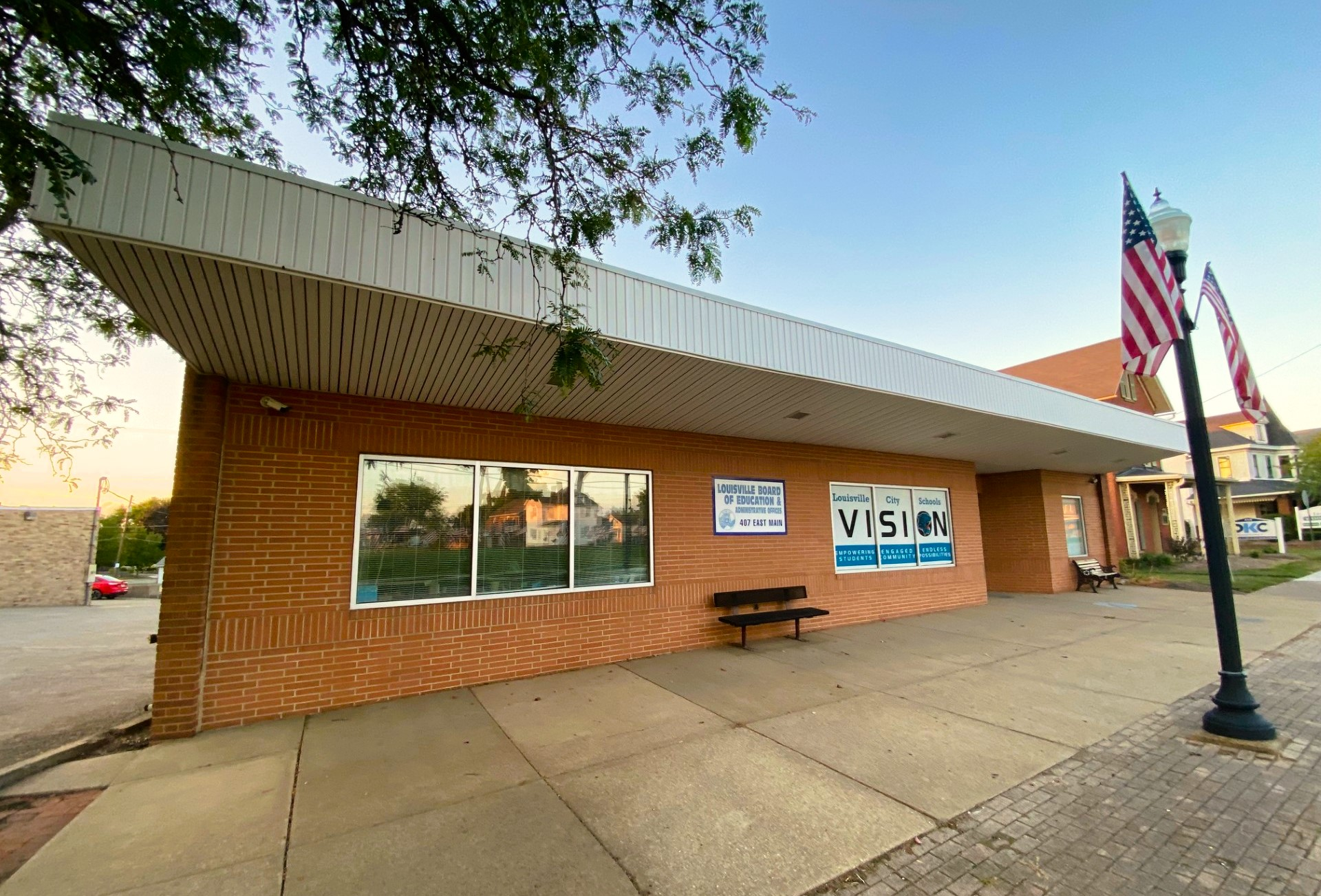
Louisville Board of Education

Louisville City School District is a public school district serving students in Louisville, Ohio, United States. Serving over 1,000 students, the district is centered on the city of Louisville and includes most of the surrounding Nimishillen Township.

== Schools ==
=== Elementary schools ===
- Louisville Elementary School - newly constructed and opened in 2012, the new Louisville Elementary replaces the former Louisville Elementary School, Fairhope Elementary School, and Pleasant Grove Elementary School.
- North Nimishillen Elementary School

=== Middle schools ===
- Louisville Middle School - newly constructed and opened in 2004, this building replaces the former Louisville Middle School, built in 1924.

=== High schools ===
- Louisville High School - originally built in 1964, this school has undergone numerous additions and renovations, in 1967, 2004, and 2011.

=== Former Schools ===
- Fairhope Elementary School (closed and demolished in 2012)
- Pleasant Grove Elementary School (closed and demolished in 2012)

== State Report Card ==
2016-2017 Report Card
