= Larry Savage (gridiron football) =

American gridiron football player (born 1957)

No. 52
- Position: Linebacker

Personal information
- Born: June 18, 1957 (age 69); Connellsville, Pennsylvania, U.S.
- Listed height: 6 ft 2 in (1.88 m)
- Listed weight: 225 lb (102 kg)

Career information
- High school: Howland (OH)
- College: Michigan State
- NFL draft: 1980: 8th round, 216th overall pick

Career history
- Dallas Cowboys (1980)*; Cleveland Browns (1981)*; Toronto Argonauts (1981)
- * Offseason or practice squad member only

Career CFL statistics
- Games played: 1

Lawrence Edward Savage (born June 18, 1957) is an American former football linebacker in the Canadian Football League (CFL) for the Toronto Argonauts. He played college football at Michigan State University.

== Early life ==
Savage attended Howland High School, where he was a starter at defensive end.

He accepted a football scholarship from Michigan State University. As a freshman, he suffered a knee injury and was lost for the season. As a sophomore, he was a backup at inside linebacker.

As a junior, he was named a starter at outside linebacker and helped the team achieve a Big Ten co-championship. He finished his college career with 12 sacks (fourth in school history), 3 interceptions and 4 fumble recoveries.

== Professional career ==
Savage was selected by the Dallas Cowboys in the eighth round (216th overall) of the 1980 NFL draft. He was waived on August 25.

In 1981, he was signed as a free agent by the Cleveland Browns. He was released on August 18.

In August 1981, he was signed as a free agent by the Toronto Argonauts of the Canadian Football League. He was released on September 11.
