= East Central Ohio League =

- Classification: OHSAA Divisions I-IV
- Founded: 1987
- No. of teams: 4
- Region: Ohio

Locations
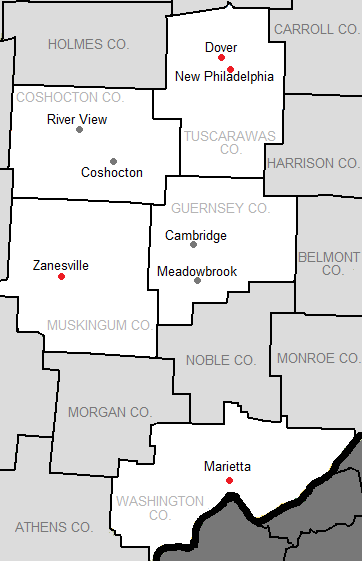
- Map of members (2017-2020)

The East Central Ohio League (ECOL) was an athletic conference of high schools in Ohio sponsored by OHSAA that existed from 1987 to 2022. Its final member schools were located in Tuscarawas and Washington Counties. Former members were located in Guernsey, Coshocton, Muskingum, and Belmont Counties.

== History ==
The ECOL was formed in 1987 with the original members being Cambridge, Coshocton, Meadowbrook, and St. Clairsville. Claymont joined the league in 1989, followed by Dover in 1993, who left the Northeastern Buckeye Conference.

After the 1996 season, St. Clairsville dropped out. Indian Valley High School left the PAC-7 to replace St. Clairsville for the 1996-97 school year. A year later New Philadelphia left the Federal League and joined. The next addition was River View, which fully completed a transition to the East Central Ohio League from the Muskingum Valley League in 2005.

Indian Valley departed the ECOL following the 2006-07 school year, joining the PAC-7, which it had been a member of prior to joining the ECOL. Following the departure of the Braves, the conference negotiated a partnership with the Muskingum Valley League to provide a full, even schedule for conference members. This would allow for even numbers of home and away games for member schools.

On October 20, 2009, it was announced that Zanesville would be joining the ECOL. On December 1, 2009, Marietta and Rosecrans were accepted as the 9th and 10th members. All 3 schools gradually joined the league with their sports, starting with track, wrestling, swimming, golf, soccer and tennis in 2010-11; basketball, baseball, softball and volleyball in 2011-12, and football in 2012.

After being extended an invitation as well, Steubenville High School ultimately declined to join the ECOL as its 11th member on May 18, 2010.

Following the expansion to ten, the conference would be split into two divisions: Scarlet and Gray. The Scarlet Division (big schools) would consist of Cambridge, Dover, Marietta, New Philadelphia and Zanesville. The Gray Division (small schools) would consist of Claymont, Coshocton, Meadowbrook, River View, and Rosecrans.

In February 2015, Claymont announced that they would join the Inter-Valley Conference beginning with the 2016-17 school year. Later, Bishop Rosecrans announced that it would leave the league as well and join the Mid-State League for the 2017-18 season, leaving the ECOL with 8 members. Realignment then shifted Cambridge to the Gray Division for the 2017-18 school year.

In 2018, it was officially announced that Coshocton, Meadowbrook, and River View would leave the ECOL to join the Muskingum Valley League (MVL) beginning with the 2020 season. Zanesville also announced that they were leaving after the 2020 season to join the Licking County League.

In 2020-2021, the Warriors of Warren Local joined the ECOL after being independent since exiting the SEOAL.

Cambridge left in 2021 for the Buckeye 8, and New Philadelphia announced they would be leaving to join the Ohio Cardinal Conference starting in 2022.

With potentially only three teams remaining (Dover, Marietta, and Warren) for the 2022 school year, the league disbanded after the 2021-22 school year. Dover would become an independent, while Marietta and Warren would join the newly formed Twin State League.

== Members ==
The following are final members of the conference:

- Dover Tornadoes (1993-2022)
- New Philadelphia Quakers (1997-2022)
- Marietta Tigers (2011-2022)
- Warren Warriors (2020-2022)

The following are former members of the conference:

- St. Clairsville Red Devils (1987-1996)
- Indian Valley Braves (1996-2007)
- Claymont Mustangs (1989-2016)
- Bishop Rosecrans Bishops (2011-2017)
- Zanesville Blue Devils (2011-2020)
- Coshocton Redskins (1987-2020)
- Meadowbrook Colts (1987-2020)
- River View Black Bears (2005-2020)
- Cambridge Bobcats (1987-2021)

Membership Timeline:

== Conference rivalries ==
- Dover vs New Philadelphia
- Claymont vs Indian Valley
- Coshocton vs River View
- Cambridge vs Meadowbrook
- Zanesville vs Cambridge
- Marietta vs Warren

== State championships ==
This table only includes state championships won by schools while a member of the East Central Ohio League:

School	Sport	Year(s)
Cambridge	Boys Golf	1994 2018
Claymont	Wrestling	1992
Coshocton	none	
Dover	Girls Track; Girls Golf	1995; 2014
Indian Valley	none	
Meadowbrook	Girls Basketball	1989
New Philadelphia	none	
River View	Girls Basketball	2006, 2007
St. Clairsville	none	

== See also ==
Ohio High School Athletic Conferences
