= A. E. Lee =

American politician

A. E. Lee was an American from Delaware, Ohio, who served as a Republican member of the Ohio House of Representatives from Delaware County, Ohio.

He graduated from the Poland Seminary in Poland, Ohio.

The collected letters of Rutherford B. Hayes include a February 16, 1870, letter to Lee (addressed and referred to as "Captain") in which Hayes expresses dubiety that his recommendation will bear any weight with "Delano" (presumably Columbus Delano, newly appointed United States Secretary of the Interior), but encloses a more generic reference letter which Hayes describes as "strong but general", praising Lee's "ability, integrity, and business experience" and "capital record as a soldier", and "soundness and effective work" as a Republican.
