= Marlington Local School District =

School district in Ohio

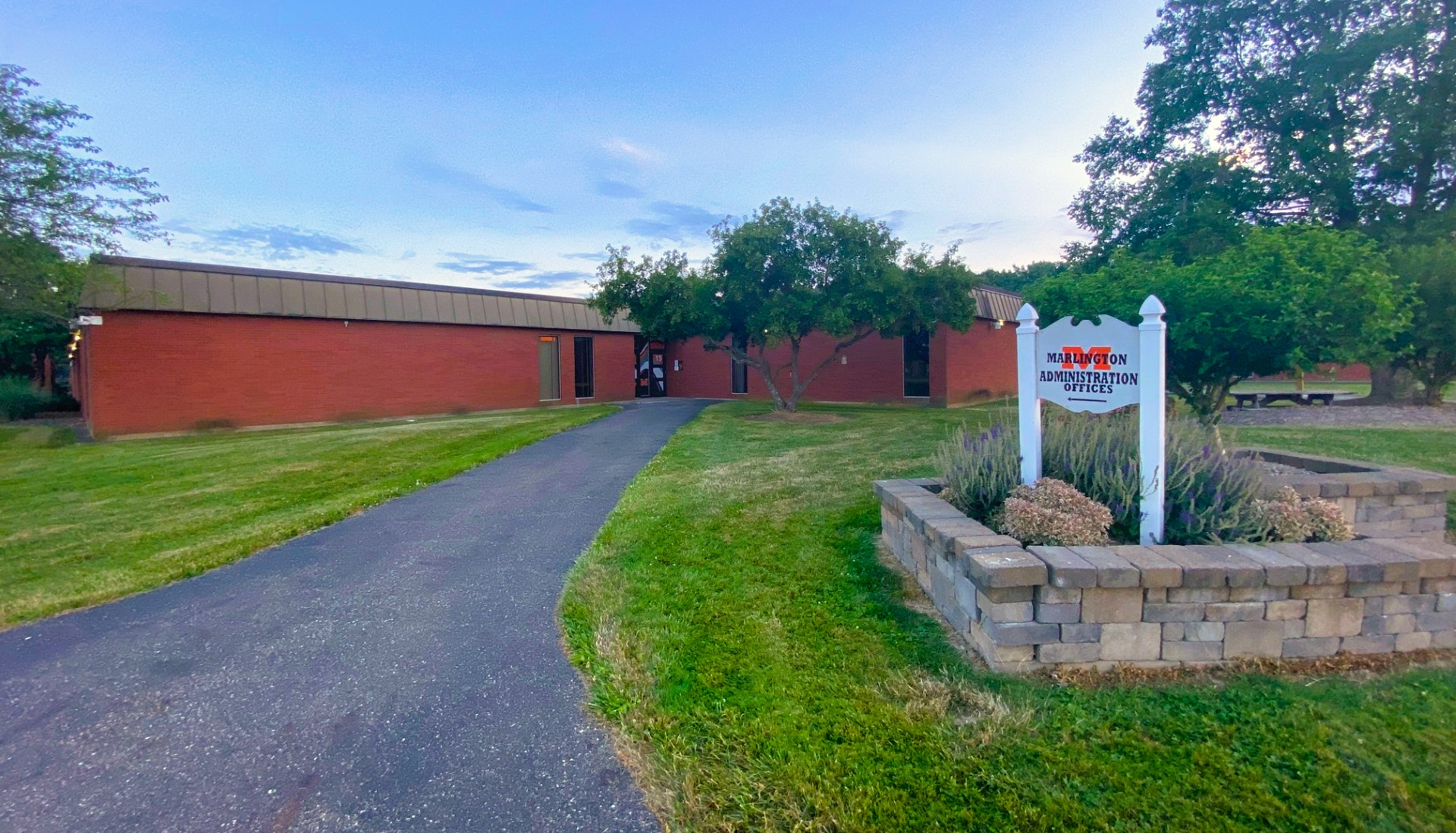
Marlington Local School District

Marlington Local Schools is a school district located in Stark County, Ohio, United States.

There are five schools in the Marlington district: Washington Elementary School, Marlboro Elementary School, Lexington Elementary School, Marlington Middle School, and Marlington High School. The sports team names are Little Dukes for the elementary schools and Dukes for Marlington Middle School and Marlington High School.
