= Howland High School =

Coordinates: 41°14′23″N 80°44′42″W

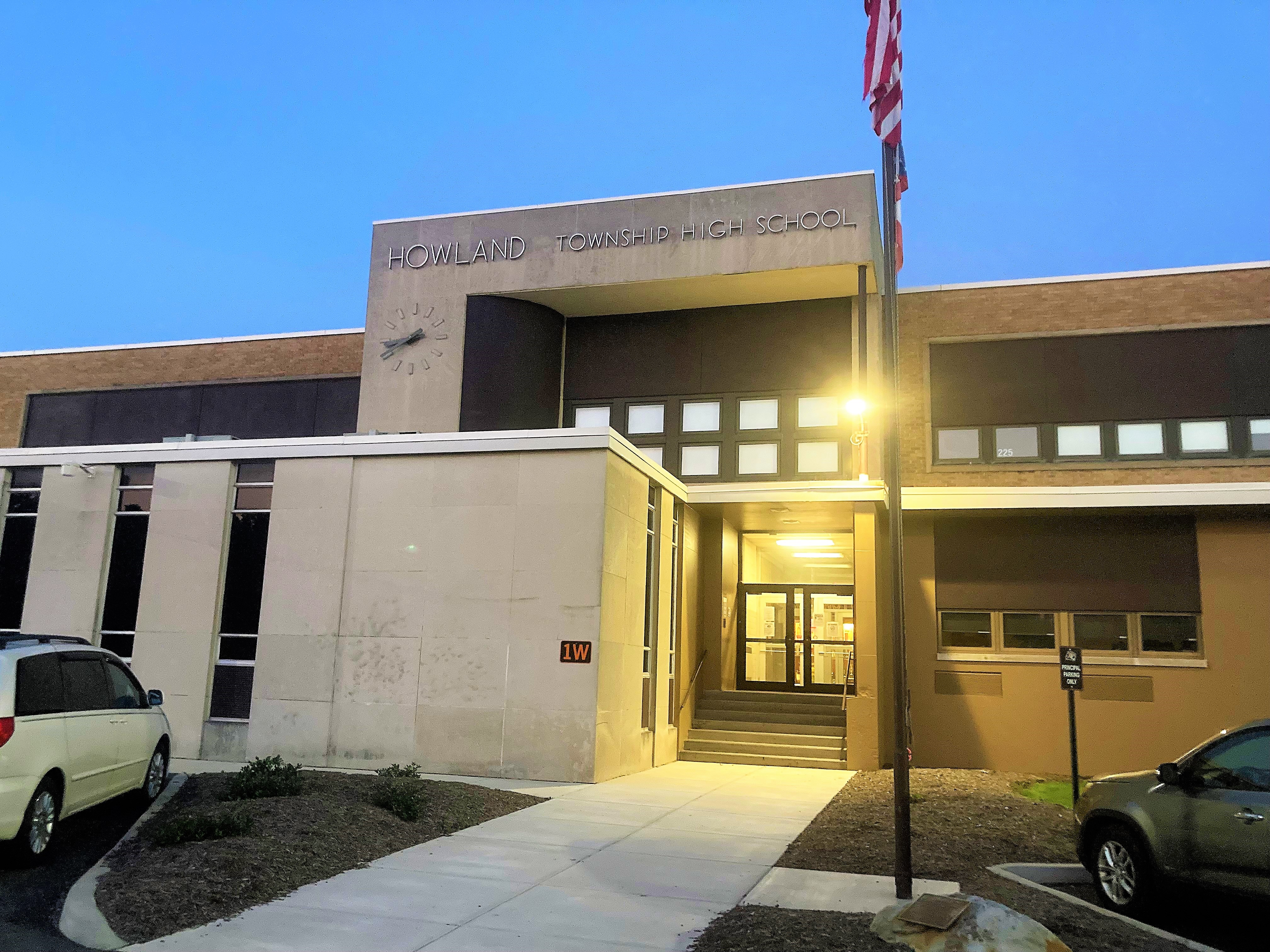

Location
- 200 Shaffer Drive; Warren, Ohio 44484; United States

Information
- Type: Public
- Opened: 1949
- School district: Howland Local School District
- NCES School ID: 390502303882
- Principal: Joe Simko
- Teaching staff: 43.75 (FTE)
- Grades: 9–12
- Enrollment: 696 (2024–25)
- Student to teacher ratio: 15.91
- Colors: Black and orange
- Athletics conference: All-American Conference; Eastern Buckeye Conference (football only)
- Team name: Tigers
- Newspaper: The Wave
- Yearbook: The Scroll
- Website: www.howlandschools.com/o/hhs

Howland High School is a public high school in Howland Township, near Warren, Ohio, United States. It is the only high school in the Howland Local School District. Athletic teams are known as the Tigers, and they compete as a member of the Ohio High School Athletic Association in the All-American Conference, and concurrently in the Eastern Buckeye Conference for football.

== History ==
Early education in Howland Township began in the early 20th century, with the consolidation of several one-room schoolhouses into two buildings, Center School and Bolindale School. By 1917, students in Howland attended the first Howland Centralized High School, with transportation being provided through horse-drawn vans. The first graduation of the Howland High School was held in 1921, with Anna Mary Strudoff serving as the school's first ever graduate, and the schools lone graduate of the class of 1921.

Following population growth during the first half of the 20th century, a new and larger high school opened at its current location in 1949.

== Extracurricular activities ==
=== Speech and debate ===
Howland High School's Speech & Debate team won OHSSL State Championships in the 2008-2009 and 2010–2011 seasons.

== Athletics ==
Howland High School currently offers:

- Baseball
- Basketball
- Bowling
- Cheerleading
- Cross country
- Golf
- Football
- Soccer
- Softball
- Tennis
- Track and field
- Volleyball

=== State championships ===
- Boys' soccer – 2020

== Notable alumni ==
- Willie Davenport - U.S. Olympic sprinter in 1964, 1968, 1972, and 1976; gold medal winner in 1968, bronze medal in 1976
- Tony Davis - former professional football player in the Canadian Football League (CFL)
- Filip Filipović - former professional football player in the National Football League (NFL)
- Vincent Mauri, distance runner
- Larry Savage - former professional football player in the CFL
- Tanner Scott, professional baseball player in Major League Baseball (MLB)
- De'Veon Smith - college football player and professional football player in the NFL and United Football League
- Chris Zylka - film and television actor, model
