= Hoover High School (Ohio) =

Public high school in North Canton, Ohio

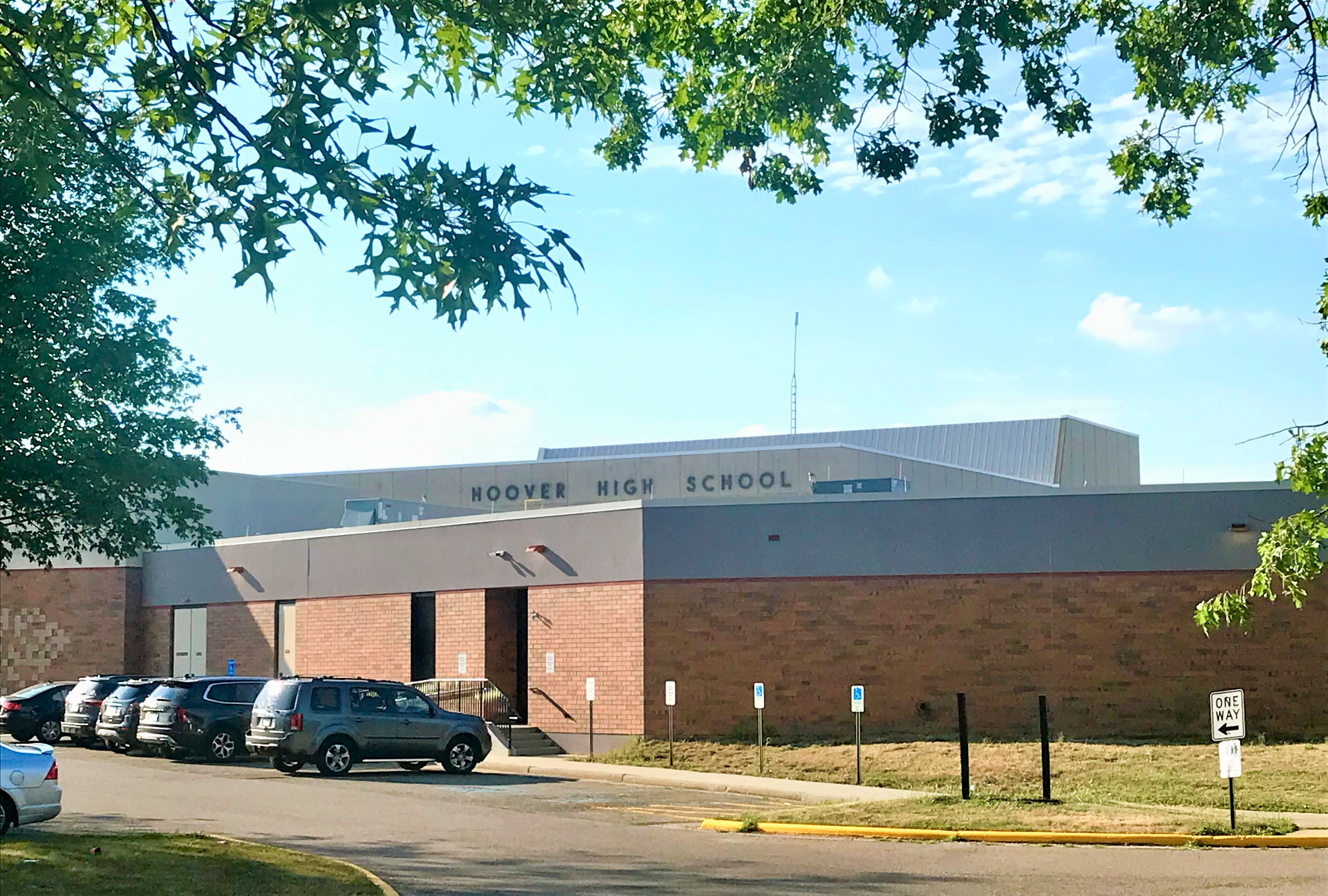

Location
- 525 7th Street NE; North Canton, Ohio 44720; United States; 40°53′07″N 81°23′43″W

Information
- Type: Public
- Established: 1929
- School district: North Canton City School District
- Principal: Henry Householder
- Teaching staff: 85.86 (FTE)
- Grades: 9–12
- Enrollment: 1,533 (2023–2024)
- Student to teacher ratio: 17.85
- Campus: Suburban
- Colors: Black and orange
- Athletics conference: Federal League
- Team name: Vikings
- Rivals: Jackson High School; Louisville High School
- Accreditation: Ohio Department of Education
- Newspaper: Viking Views
- Website: www.northcantonschools.org/home/schools/hoover-high-school/

Hoover High School, often referred to as North Canton Hoover, is a public high school in North Canton, Ohio, United States.

== Name ==
The school's original name was North Canton High School which students referred to as "No. Ca. Hi." In 1957, a new high school building was named in dedication to local resident William Henry "Boss" Hoover, founder of The Hoover Company whose world headquarters was in the area at that time.

== Academics ==
Hoover High School had an "A" achievement rating for the 2013–2014 school year on their Ohio Report Card and also an "A" for graduation rate.

== Athletics ==
Hoover athletics teams compete as a member of the Ohio High School Athletic Association (OHSAA) and as a member of the Federal League. Hoover's girls softball team has won the state championship eight times, in 1998, 1999, 2006, 2008, 2011, 2012, 2013 and 2014. In addition, the girls cross country team placed second in the state championships in 2008. The boys lacrosse team won the Ohio High School Lacrosse Association (non-OHSAA) state championship in 2006, going 18-2 overall. The Hoover girls lacrosse team finished second in the state in 2010 and again in 2011.

In 1985, the Vikings reached the state finals in football and state was state runner-up in basketball. The baseball team reached the Ohio Final Four in 1992 and 1999. Since joining the Federal League in 1968, the Hoover football program has claimed 22 Federal League Championships.

The Hoover High track & field team has also had success over the years, producing three individual state champions.

=== State championships ===
- Boys basketball – 1939 (When known as North Canton H.S.)
- Girls basketball - 2002
- Softball – 1998, 1999, 2006, 2008, 2011, 2012, 2013, 2014
- Wrestling – 1965

== Music ==
The instrumental music department consists of many performing ensembles. In fall, the band members participate in the Viking Marching Band which marches in all Hoover football games, OMEA marching competitions, and the Pro Football Hall of Fame Grand Parade. The band received an 'Excellent' rating at the OMEA state finals adjudicated competition in 2013, 2014, and 2015. When football season ends, the band splits up into a Concert Band and Symphonic Band. Both bands have consistently received superior ratings at OMEA non-marching competitions. Other ensembles in the instrumental department include Pep Band, two jazz bands, String Orchestra, and Full Orchestra as well as numerous small ensembles. The band and orchestra students take trips to places such as Walt Disney World and Universal Studios Orlando every two years.

The choirs in the vocal department are the Concert Choir, Symphonic Choir, Men's Chorus, Women's Chorus, Hi-Notes, Lo-Notes, Women's Chorale, and the elite Hi-Lo's ensemble. The Symphonic Choir, Men’s Chorus, and Women’s Chorus consistently earn Superior and Excellent ratings at District and State Contests. Along with these choirs, the vocal music department puts on an annual musical. They also put on the annual Spring Sing concert, which highlights all ensembles in the district as well, musical numbers by the years' seniors, and several poems.

== Notable alumni ==
- Austin Appleby, college football coach
- Todd Blackledge, professional football player in the National Football League (NFL) and sports broadcaster
- Jud Logan, 4-time Olympian and former American Record holder in the hammer throw
- Sarah Matthews, former White House deputy press secretary
- Eddie McClintock, actor
- Jeffrey Mylett, actor and songwriter
- Dick Snyder, professional basketball player in the National Basketball Association (NBA)
- Rabbit Warstler, professional baseball player in Major League Baseball
