= Brandon Todd (basketball) =

American basketball player

- Born: August 13, 1985 (age 41)
- Occupations: Fitness expert, exercise instructor, Rehabilitation Specialist
- Years active: 2006–present
- Height: 5 ft 5 in (1.65 m)
- Website: http://www.brandontodd.tv

Brandon Michael Todd (born August 13, 1985) is an athlete known for his high vertical jump and ability to slam dunk a basketball despite being 5'5" tall. Brandon was a four-year starter on the Cambridge High School (CHS) basketball team and a breakout star at Muskingum College. In March 2013 Brandon trained Lenny Bernstein of The Washington Post. Larry got Brandon to talk about his love of jumping, his 44-inch vertical, and his first dunk story at 5'2 at the age of 13. Yahoo Sports' Head of Sports, Entertainment & Studies, David H. Katz wrote an article in June about Todd, in which he challenged an old teammate and competitor LeBron James to take the FlytRight Challenge. In Oct 2013, Marci Ien of Canada AM CTV did a Special sharing his challenge and efforts to prove that anyone could dunk.

== High school career ==
During his first year as a starter he was fifth in scoring and third in assists. He helped his experienced team reach the State Tournament. The following year Brandon came into his own as one of the top performers at his position and in the E.C.O.L conference. Brandon was second in scoring with 398 points, reaching double-figures in 20 games. He scored 20+ points eight times, with a season-high of 31 in the district championship versus Steubenville. Todd also led the Bobcats in steals with 39, three-pointers with 45, and tied for the team lead in assists with 69.

During his sophomore season Brandon was named Honorable Mention All-Ohio by the AP and Division II Second Team All-Eastern District; also receiving a Second Team Selection in the E.C.O.L. His Junior season saw Brandon break out from a young player into a dominant scorer. Brandon Todd led the Bobcats in scoring with 473 points, reaching double-figures in all 21 games. He scored 20+ points 14 times, and 30+ points four times, with a season-high of 33 at home vs. Indian Creek. Todd also led the Bobcats in steals with 65 and three-pointers with 74. Brandon Todd became the eleventh player in CHS history to score 900 points in his career. Todd finished the season ninth on the CHS career scoring list with 998 points.

- - Todd's season total of 473 points is the tenth-highest single-season total in CHS history.
- - Todd ties the CHS single-season steals record with 65, tying the one set by Dustin Ford in 1994-95.
- - Todd sets a CHS single-season record for three-pointers with 74, breaking the previous record of 72 set by Geno Ford in 1991-92.
- - Todd is named First Team All-Ohio by the AP and Division II Eastern District Co-Player Of The Year.
- - Todd is named ECOL Player of the Year.

In Brandon's final season, he led the Bobcats in scoring with 449 points, reaching double-figures in 20 games. He scored 20+ points 12 times, and 30+ points three times, with a season-high of 42 in the sectional win over Morgan. Todd also led the Bobcats in assists with 69, steals with 57, and three-pointers with 58. He became the second All-Time leading scorer in school history with 1,447 pts. (1999-2003) He was co-captain of the first team, and an all-star that season in the OVAC

- - Todd finishes his career as the CHS career steals leader with 184.
- - Todd finishes his career second on the CHS career three-pointers list with 182.
- - Todd finishes his career third on the CHS career assists list with 258.
- - Todd becomes the fourth player in CHS history to score 500 field goals. He finishes his career third on the list with 536.
- - Todd is named First Team All-Ohio by the AP and Division II Eastern District Co-Player Of The Year.

== College career ==
=== Recruiting ===
"Well out of high school I was recruited by some schools but my size and everything was a big factor so I didn't get much exposure," said Todd. "The best thing for me to do was to go to junior college." This move landed him at Olney Central College in Illinois but only for a year, after which Todd decided to get into fitness by moving to Maryland and working with his uncle who was a personal trainer. While working in the gym, he continued to blaze on the basketball court. He was even recruited by a couple of local collegiate programs. "I got some looks from a school called Salisbury State University, and Howard University actually wanted me to sign," said Todd. "As I was going down to sign with Howard their coaching staff got fired and they went on an 18 game losing streak." Todd decided not to sign with Howard and instead continued to lift weights with his uncle until he was contacted by Geno Ford in 2005. Coach Ford had just been named the new head basketball coach at Muskingum and called Brandon to see if he wanted to come back to southeastern Ohio to play basketball. "I thought about it for a while and I kept telling him no and he kept calling and Coach Kirby kept calling and I kept saying no, I wasn't going to play and I finally talked to my mom and they had been hinting that they wanted to see me play some more," Todd recalled. "Next thing you know, I came back."

=== Player ===
Brandon decided to play basketball at Muskingum College in New Concord Ohio. During his time at Muskingum College Brandon transformed his body & his athletic ability to become the best point guard in the Ohio Athletic Conference (O.A.C). It's during this summer that Brandon really developed his training methods and began to engulf himself into fitness. From 2006 until 2008 Brandon was an All-Conference guard, twice earning first team ballots. During his entire career at Muskingum College he led the conference in assists, assist-to-turnover-ratio, and twice in the steals category. The Cambridge native scored 20 or more points on nine occasions in his first season and made his Muskie debut with a 34-point, 11 assist, nine rebound outburst in a game against the University of Redlands.

Gene Ford, father of Geno Ford, a member of Muskingum's Athletic Hall of Fame, coached Brandon for four years at Cambridge High School and the past two seasons as an assistant coach here at Muskingum. While at Cambridge, Ford compiled 400 wins and was inducted to the Ohio High School Basketball Coaches Association Hall of Fame. "Brandon has grown as an individual tremendously from a high school senior to a college senior," Ford explained. "I mean it's fun to see that his leadership skills have developed."

Brandon Todd selected to first team all AOC. He became the 27th Muskingum player to reach 1,000 points on January 4, 2008. He stated when asked about LeBron James in an article by David H. Katz of Yahoo! Sports, "How much better might the King's game be if he decided to use FlytRight this offseason? "Don't even get me started," Todd jokes. "His vertical would be mid-50s, easy... If LeBron took the challenge and did my program, he'd never have to shoot a jumper again."" Todd has faced LeBron on multiple occasions as high school athletes, and was even first team all-Ohio alongside James two years in a row.
