= Filip Filipović (American football) =

Serbian gridiron football player (born 1977)

Filip Filipovic
No. 10
- Position: Punter

Personal information
- Born: November 5, 1977 (age 49); Belgrade, SR Serbia, SFR Yugoslavia (now Serbia)
- Listed height: 6 ft 2 in (1.88 m)
- Listed weight: 216 lb (98 kg)

Career information
- High school: Howland (Warren, Ohio, U.S.)
- College: South Dakota
- NFL draft: 2002: undrafted

Career history
- Dallas Cowboys (2002); San Francisco 49ers (2004)*; Minnesota Vikings (2004)*; Philadelphia Eagles (2005)*; Houston Texans (2006)*; Chicago Bears (2007)*
- * Offseason or practice squad member only

Career NFL statistics
- Games played: 9
- Stats at Pro Football Reference

Filip Filipovic (Serbian Cyrillic: Филип Филиповић) (born November 5, 1977) is a Serbian former professional American football punter in the National Football League for the Dallas Cowboys. He played college football at the University of South Dakota.

== Early life ==
Filipovic moved from Yugoslavia to the United States as a foreign exchange student in 1992. He attended Howland High School. As a junior, he broke his foot in the season opener. As a senior, he served as the team's placekicker and punter, making 13 field goals and averaging 35 yards per punt.

He enrolled at Urbana College where although he was named the starter at placekicker, he instead decided to give up football and transfer to Eastern Michigan University. In 1999, he walked on at Division II University of South Dakota.

As a sophomore, he became the starter at punter, posting 57 punts for a 38.1-yard average and a long of 56 yards. As a junior, he registered 73 punts for a 40.7-yard average (seventh in Division II) and a long of 62 yards.

As a senior, he served as the team's placekicker and punter, making 7-of-10 field goals for a 62.5 percent (third in the conference), 18-of-19 extra points for a 92.3 percent (fifth in the conference) and 53 punts for a 40.1-yard average (fourth in the conference). He finished his career with 183 punts for a 39.7-yard average and a long of 66 yards.

== Professional career ==
Filipović was signed as an undrafted free agent by the Dallas Cowboys after the 2002 NFL draft. He was waived on September 1. On October 23, he was re-signed to replace a struggling Micah Knorr. Against the Detroit Lions, he had 10 punts (tied for second in franchise history) for a 41.4-yard average and downed two kicks inside the 10-yard line. He finished the season with a 40.6-yard average, 14 punts downed inside the 20-yard line, a long of 60 yards and 2 special teams tackles. On August 17, 2003, he was released after being passed on the depth chart by Toby Gowin.

On January 7, 2004, he signed a futures contract with the San Francisco 49ers. He was cut on April 27.

On July 23, 2004, he was signed as a free agent by the Minnesota Vikings. He was released on August 3.

On February 10, 2005, he was signed by the Philadelphia Eagles with the intention of allocating him to NFL Europe. He was cut on March 7.

On March 28, 2006, he signed with the Houston Texans. He was released on July 29.

On April 9, 2007, he was signed by the Chicago Bears. He was released on August 1.

== Personal life ==
After football he trained several kickers and punters, developing skills to break into professional football leagues. Filipovic also works with agents that sign and negotiate NFL contracts.
