= Poland Seminary High School =

Public school in Ohio, United States

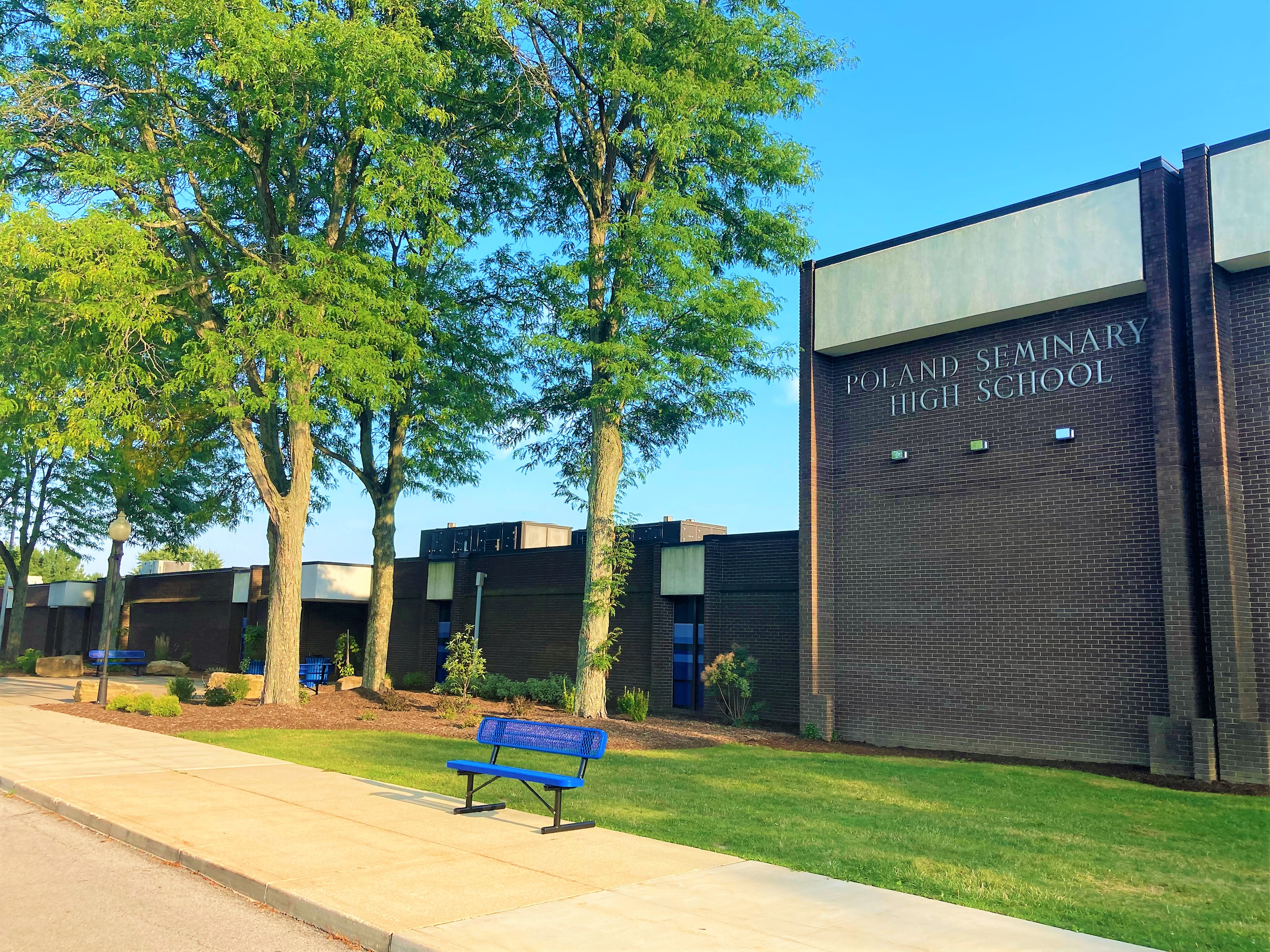

Location
- 3199 Dobbins Road; Poland, Ohio 44514; United States; 41°00′17″N 80°35′26″W

Information
- Type: Public high school
- Opened: 1972
- School district: Poland Local School District
- Superintendent: Craig Hockenberry
- CEEB code: 362988
- Principal: Kevin Snyder
- Teaching staff: 42.03 (FTE)
- Grades: 7-12
- Student to teacher ratio: 19.34
- Campus type: Large Suburb
- Colors: Blue and White
- Athletics conference: Northeast 8 Athletic Conference
- Team name: Bulldogs
- Athletic Director: Brian Banfield
- Website: hs.polandbulldogs.com

Poland Seminary High School is a public high school in Poland, Ohio, United States. It is the only high school in the Poland Local School District. Athletic teams are known as the Bulldogs, and they compete as a member of the Ohio High School Athletic Association in the Northeast 8 Athletic Conference.

== History ==
Although the current building was built in 1972, Poland Seminary High School owes its name to an earlier institution, Poland Seminary, which was one of the first private colleges to admit women. In the early 1900s, the institution was deeded to The Poland Schools for $1.00 with the stipulation that it forever be called "Poland Seminary". This former institution matriculated US President William McKinley, and the present high school claims McKinley as an alumnus. In 1999, students from the high school visited the Ohio Seventh District Court of Appeals.

== Athletics ==
=== OHSAA state championships ===
- Boys Track and field – 1947, 1951, 2000
- Football – 1999
- Girls golf – 2008
- Girls softball – 2011

Associated Press state championships

- Football – 1999

== Notable alumni ==
- William McKinley – 25th President of the United States
- Michael Rulli – member of the U.S. House of Representatives from Ohio's 6th district
- Helen Murray Free – former chemist and educator
- Logan Flament - US Naval Academy Cross Country Team Captain
