= Alliance High School (Ohio) =

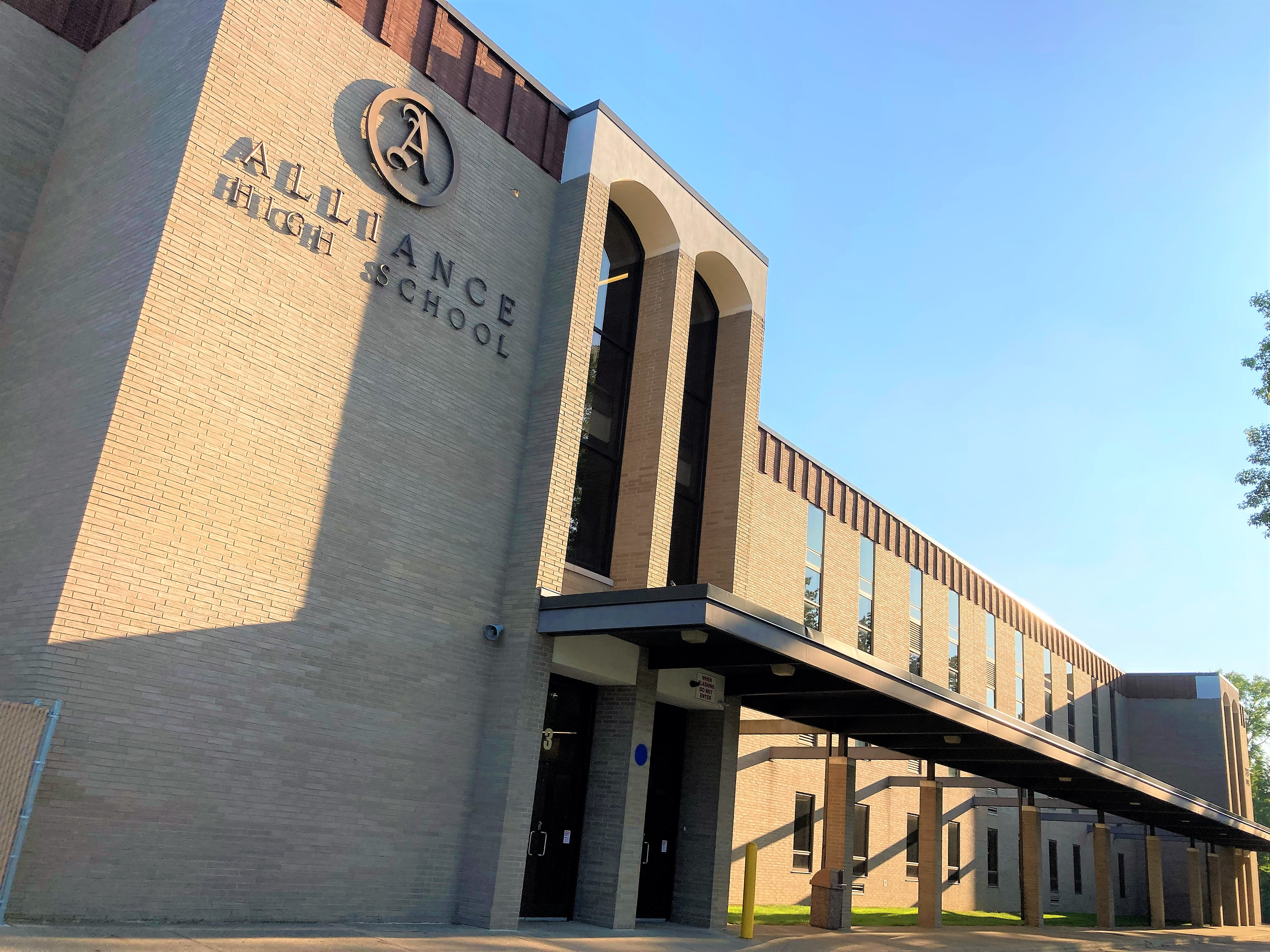

Location
- 400 Glamorgan Street; Alliance, Ohio 44601; United States
- 40.9113°N 81.1114°W

Information
- Type: Public
- Established: 1868
- Status: Open
- School district: Alliance City School District
- CEEB code: 360120
- Principal: Shaun Fontaine
- Teaching staff: 50.00 (FTE)
- Grades: 9–12
- Enrollment: 957 (2023–2024)
- Average class size: 25
- Student to teacher ratio: 19.14
- Campus type: Fringe Town
- Colors: Fighter Red, Battle Blue, and Historical Blue
- Fight song: The Air Force Song ("Wild Blue Yonder")
- Athletics conference: Eastern Buckeye Conference
- Team name: Aviators
- Rival: Marlington Dukes
- Yearbook: The Chronicle
- Website: www.alliancecityschools.org/o/high-school

Alliance High School is a public high school in Alliance, Ohio, United States. It is the only high school in the Alliance City School District. Its athletic teams compete as the Alliance Aviators in the Ohio High School Athletic Association as a member of the Eastern Buckeye Conference.

== Athletics ==
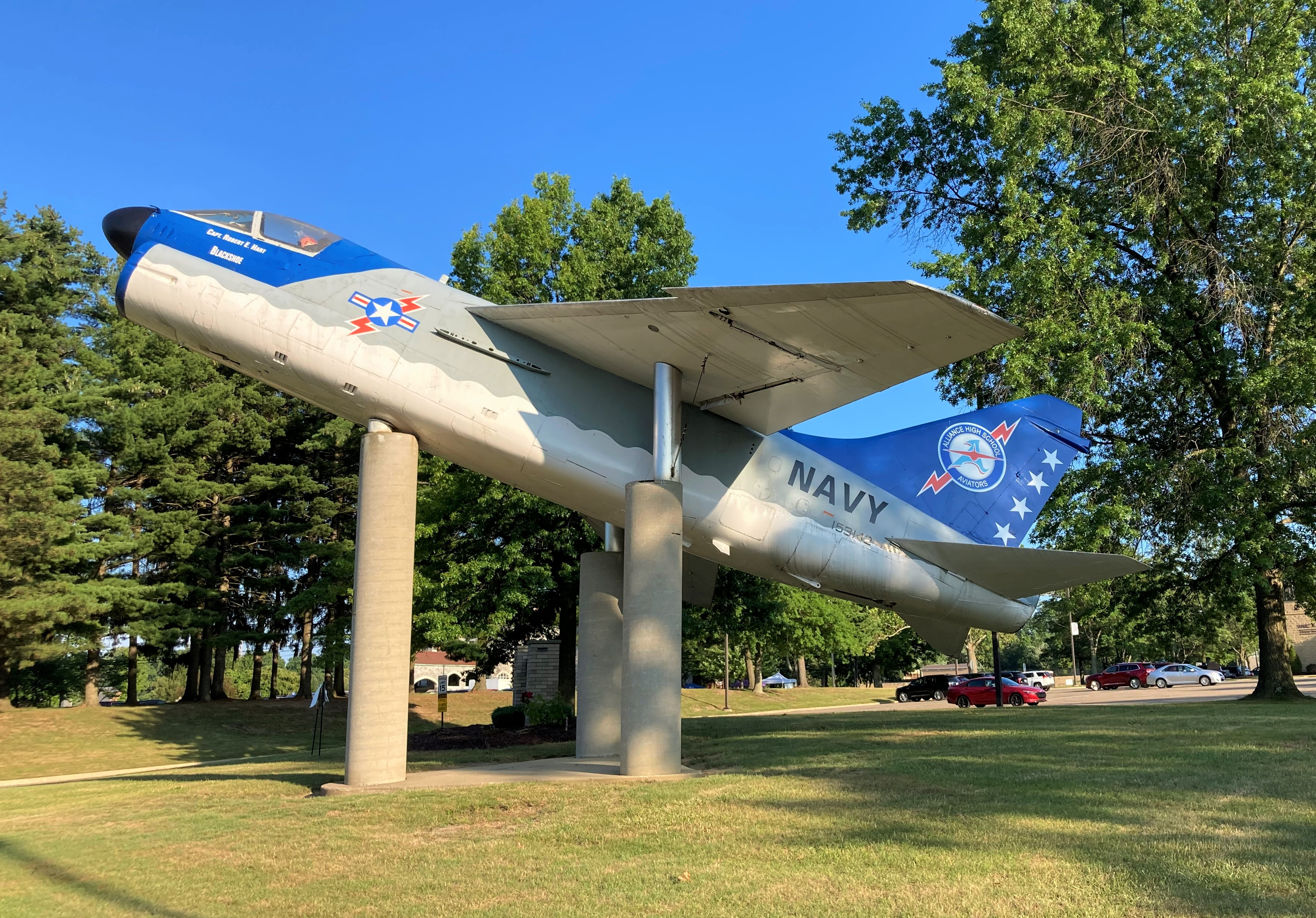
The A-7 Corsair II at Alliance High School.

The school's sports teams are known as the Aviators, a name reflecting the area’s aircraft production plants during the 1920s. The school has its own A-7 Corsair II outside the building.

=== State championships ===
- Boys track and field – 1976, 1984, 2005

== Notable alumni ==
- Len Dawson, Pro Football Hall of Fame quarterback
- Gertrude Alice Kay, children's book illustrator and author
- Perry King, actor
