= Eastern Buckeye Conference =

High school athletic conference in Ohio

The Eastern Buckeye Conference is an OHSAA athletic league that began competition in the 2018–19 school year and is made up of member schools from Carroll, Columbiana, Mahoning, and Stark Counties in Ohio. This conference is made up of members of the former Northeastern Buckeye Conference. The conference will transition into a football-only conference beginning the 2028–29 school year.

== Members ==
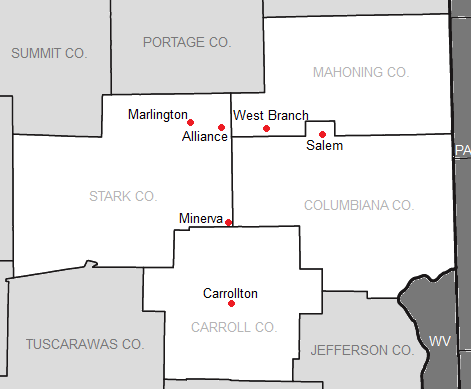
Member Schools since 2018

School	Nickname	Location	Colors	Year joined	Notes
Alliance	Aviators	Alliance	Red, columbia blue	2018	Transitioning to football-only participant in 2028
Carrollton	Warriors	Carrollton	Black, white	2018	Leaving in 2028 for Northeast Senate League
Howland	Tigers	Howland Township	Orange, black	2026	Member for football only
Marlington	Dukes	Lexington	Orange, black	2018	Leaving in 2028 for Northeast Senate League
Minerva	Lions	Minerva	Crimson, gray	2018	Leaving in 2028 for Northeast Senate League
Salem	Quakers	Salem	Red, black	2018	Leaving in for Northeast 8 in 2027 for all sports except football
West Branch	Warriors	Beloit	Green, white	2018	Transitioning to football-only participant in 2028

Future members

School	Nickname	Location	Colors	Year joining	Notes
Central Catholic	Crusaders	Canton	Green, white	2028	joining for football only in 2028
Crestview	Rebels	Columbiana	Black & gold	2028	joining for football only in 2028

== Former Members ==
School	Nickname	Location	Colors	Tenure	Notes
Canton South	Wildcats	Canton	Red, gray	2018–2022	Left for Principals Athletic Conference

== History ==
In December 2015, discussions began between members of the Northeastern Buckeye Conference to create a new league that didn't include member school Louisville. February 2016, the Northeastern Buckeye Conference disbanded, the other members in the league at the time (Alliance, Canton South, Carrollton, Marlington, Minerva, Salem, and West Branch) voted to form the Eastern Buckeye Conference that would begin play in the fall of 2018. Other nearby schools were invited to join the league such as Crestview and Beaver Local. Those schools would decline their invitations, joining other conferences instead. South Range had originally accepted their invitation to become the leagues eighth member but retracted its invitation and instead joined the newly formed Northeast 8 Conference.

In July 2020, Canton South announced that they had accepted an invitation to the Principals Athletic Conference and would be leaving following the 2021–22 school year. East Liverpool was offered to replace Canton South beginning the 2022–23 school year but declined their invitation after internal discussions with coaches, ultimately remaining in the Buckeye 8.

Howland announced in May 2024 that they would be joining the Eastern Buckeye Conference for football only starting the 2026 season, after years of being an independent school.

Carrollton, Marlington and Minerva announced their intention to leave the EBC effective the 2028–29 school year for a new athletic conference called the Northeast Senate League with Claymont, Fairless, Sandy Valley, Tuscarawas Valley and Tuslaw, all of them being former Senate League members. West Branch and Salem announced on February 14, 2026, that they would be searching for a new league as a result of the news, both schools applied to become the eighth and ninth members of the Northeast 8 Athletic Conference, however, on March 13, 2026, the Northeast 8 denied both schools. The Northeast 8 citied that "it was not in the best interest of the conferences core members at this time." West Branch also applied to the All-American Conference and the Metro Athletic Conference in late March 2026, with Alliance also looking toward joining Stark County leagues. Salem announced in May 2026, they will be leaving the EBC in favor of the Northeast 8, beginning the 2027–28 school year. West Branch and Alliance opted to remain EBC members for football-only beginning in 2028, while also adding schools such as Salem, Howland, Canton Central Catholic and Crestview, pending approval from respective school board's approval

== Conference Championships ==
List of Conference Champions since 2018.

Year	Football	Volleyball	Girls Basketball	Boys Basketball	Baseball	Softball
2018–19	Alliance	Salem/Marlington	Salem/Canton South	Alliance	Marlington	West Branch
2019–20	Alliance	Marlington	West Branch	West Branch	NO SEASON- COVID	NO SEASON- COVID
2020–21	West Branch	Marlington	Marlington	West Branch/Canton South/Salem	Salem	West Branch
2021–22	West Branch	Marlington	Marlington	Alliance	Marlington	Marlington
2022–23	West Branch	Marlington	Marlington/Salem	Carrollton/Alliance	Alliance	Marlington
2023–24	West Branch	Marlington	West Branch	West Branch	Alliance	Marlington
2024–25	West Branch	Marlington	West Branch	Carrollton/Alliance	Carrollton	West Branch
2025–26	West Branch	Marlington	West Branch	Alliance	Alliance	Marlington
2026–27	West Branch	West Branch				
