= Poland Seminary =

Coordinates: 41°00′17″N 80°35′26″W

Poland Seminary, originally Poland Academy, was a name used for a series of schools operated in Poland, Ohio.

== First academy ==
The original Poland Academy was created in 1830 by a Presbyterian minister named Bradley (first name unknown), in a room over a general store, teaching English, classical languages, philosophy and literature. After five years of operation, it was taken over by a man named Lynch who moved it to a site on what would be named College Street. This Academy closed in 1845 due to a lack of funding.

== Second academy ==
In 1849, Barnabus F. Lee opened his proprietary Lee's Girls Academy on College Street, and the Presbyterians opened a new Academy for boys. Lee's Girls Academy incorporated in 1854 as the Poland Female College and moved into a larger building. In 1855, the Boy's Academy building burnt down and was never rebuilt, while the Female College moved into a new three-story brick structure elsewhere on College Street. Despite the name, the "Female College" appears to have begun taking male students at some time during this era, as contemporary biographies chronicle prominent males who were educated there. At some point, it seems to have shifted to the older name of Poland Academy, although the name of Poland Institute seems also to have been used.

The Ohio Law College, sometimes called the Poland Law School opened in 1855 in the building vacated by the Female College, but failed to attract funding, and in 1859 moved to Cleveland, Ohio. The Poland Medical College which briefly operated on the third floor of the same building seems to have shut down at that time.

In the late 1850s, William McKinley attended the Academy, graduating in 1859. Lee apparently had financing problems, as the Academy had to be reorganized in 1862. A new board of trustees took over, adopted the name "Poland Seminary," and paying off the debts of the old Academy; but by 1871, the school was once again suffering from a lack of cash. The Presbytery of Mahoning now took control of the school, operating it under the name Poland Seminary School or Poland Union Seminary as a Christian school teaching at a high school and junior college level. A dormitory for boys from out of town was built, but female students had to room and board in nearby private housing. From 1881-1883, Ida Tarbell was the preceptress or head teacher there.

== Decline ==
In 1895, portions of the aging school building collapsed; the remainder was demolished, and a building built on the foundation. The seminary continued to struggle, and on June 21, 1909, the facility was sold to Poland's city school district under the condition that the high school retain the name of Poland Seminary. That school is Poland Seminary High School.

== Notable alumni and faculty ==
- A. E. Lee - Ohio state legislator
- William McKinley - 25th President of the United States
- Ida Tarbell - muckraker journalist
