= Carrollton High School (Carrollton, Ohio) =

Public high school in Carrollton, Ohio, United States

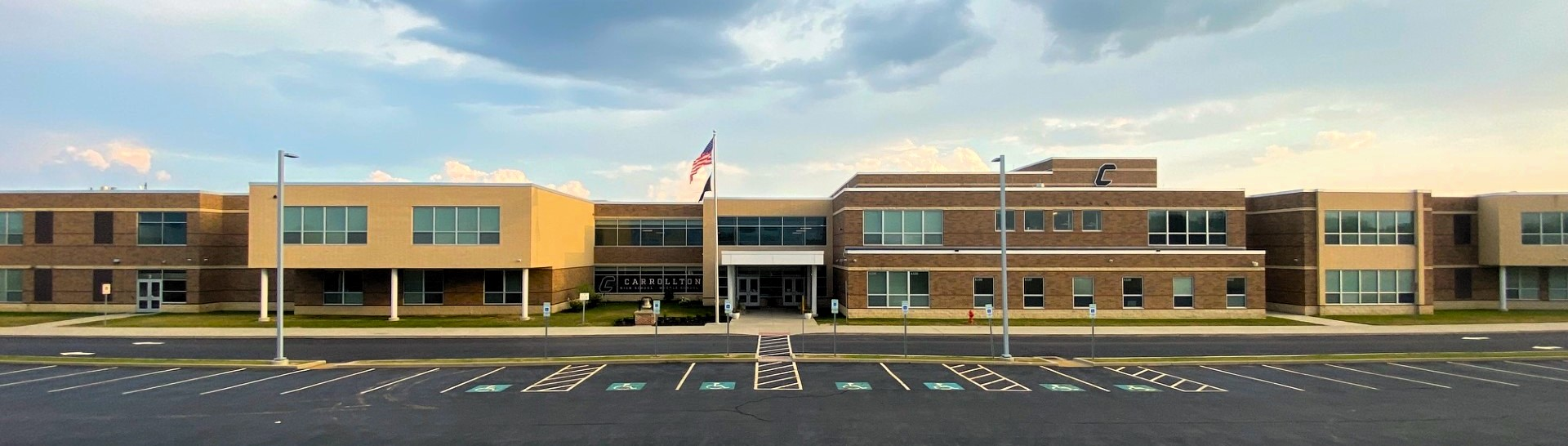

Location
- 252 Third Street NE; Carrollton, (Carroll County), Ohio 44615; United States
- Coordinates: 40°34′23″N 81°4′56″W

Information
- Type: Public, Coeducational high school
- School district: Carrollton Exempted Village School District
- Superintendent: Dave Davis
- Principal: Jason Eddy
- Teaching staff: 35.00 (FTE)
- Grades: 9-12
- Student to teacher ratio: 14.77
- Colors: Black and White
- Athletics conference: Eastern Buckeye Conference
- Mascot: Warrior
- Team name: Warriors
- Accreditation: North Central Association of Colleges and Schools
- Website: https://www.carrolltonschools.org/o/chs

Carrollton High School is a public high school in Carrollton, Ohio. The construction of a new Carrollton High School began in December 1935 and the school opened on September 14, 1936. It is the only high school in the Carrollton Exempted Village School District. Carrollton HS is in the central part of Carroll County, Ohio. It is located near Bell-Herron Middle School and is connected to Carrollton Elementary School. The athletic teams are named the Warriors and are members of the Eastern Buckeye Conference,
