= North Canton, Ohio =

- City
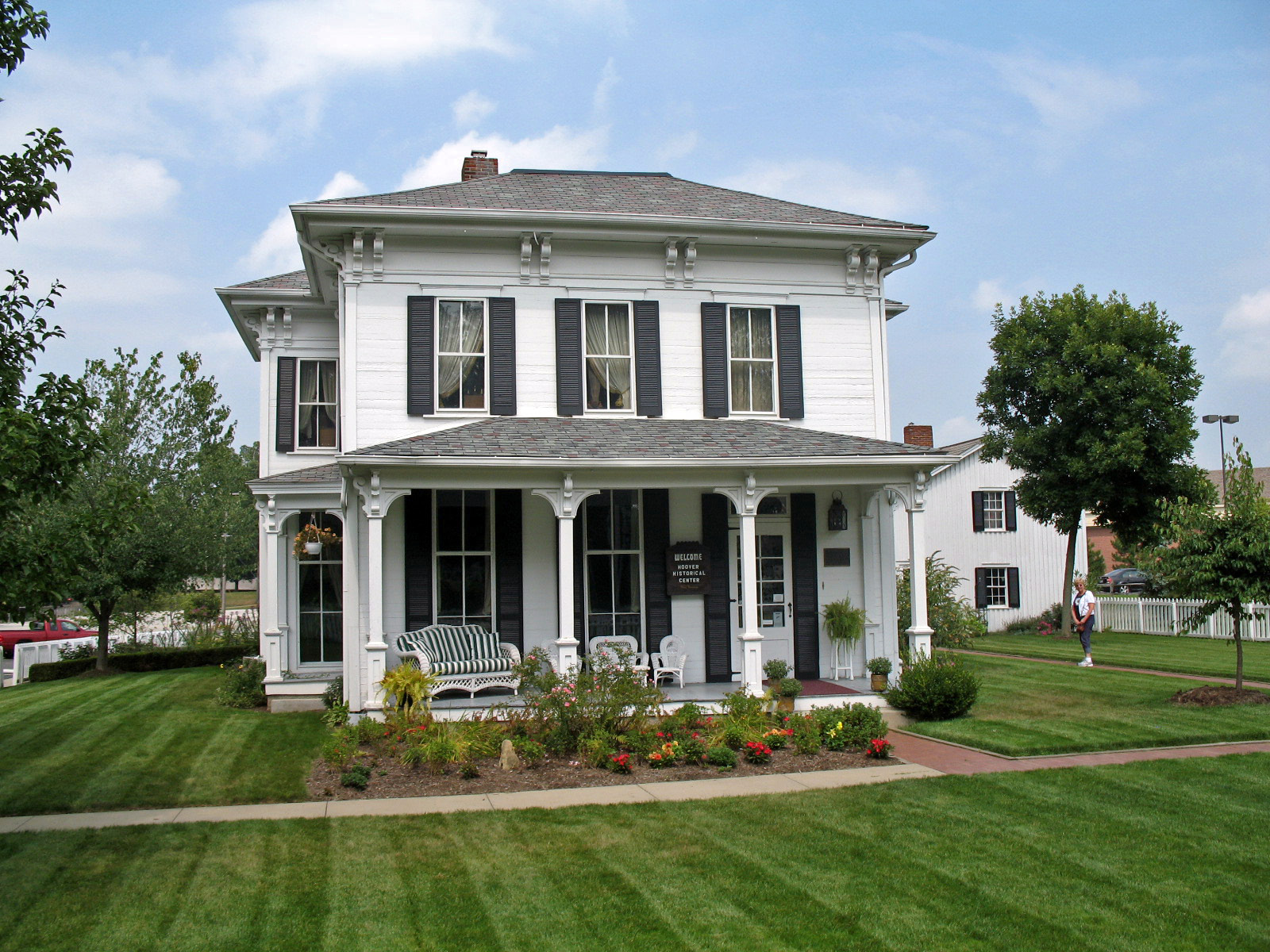
- Hoover Historical Center

- Seal Logo
- Nickname: The Dogwood City
- Interactive map of North Canton, Ohio
- Location within Ohio Location within the United States
- Coordinates: 40.874177°N 81.397228°W
- Country: United States
- State: Ohio
- County: Stark
- Township: Plain
- Platted: February 19, 1831
- Incorporated (village): November 21, 1905 as the village of New Berlin
- Renamed: January 1918 as the village of North Canton
- Incorporated (city): January 1, 1962 as the city of North Canton

Government
  - Type: Mayor–Council
  - Mayor: Matthew Stroia
  - Vice President: Christina Weyrick
  - Councilmembers: Jamie McCleaster; David Metheney; John Orr

Area
  - Total: 6.426 sq mi (16.642 km^{2})
  - Land: 6.426 sq mi (16.642 km^{2})
  - Water: 0 sq mi (0.000 km^{2}) 0.0%
- Elevation: 1,129 ft (344 m)

Population (2020)
  - Total: 17,842
  - Estimate (2024): 17,677
  - Density: 2,776.7/sq mi (1,072.1/km^{2})
- Time zone: UTC–5 (Eastern (EST))
  - Summer (DST): UTC–4 (EDT)
- ZIP Codes: 44709, 44720, 44799
- Area codes: 330 and 234
- FIPS code: 39-56294
- GNIS feature ID: 2395252
- Website: northcantonohio.gov

North Canton is a city in Stark County, Ohio, United States. The population was 17.842 at the 2020 census, and was estimated at 17.677 in 2024. It is a suburb in the Canton–Massillon metropolitan area.

== History ==
North Canton was established by "German settlers" February 19, 1831, as the Village of New Berlin; the first village platted in Plain Township in Stark County. Residents were primarily of German descent. During World War I, it became unfashionable to be associated with German culture via namesakes, so in 1918, the community changed the name of the town to North Canton.

William H. "Boss" Hoover moved his tannery business from his family farm to the center of the New Berlin village in 1873. The first upright vacuum cleaner was invented in June 1908 in North Canton by department store janitor James M. Spangler. Hoover bought the patent, and The Hoover Company became the world's largest manufacturer of vacuum cleaners by the 1930s. In 2007, Hoover officially shut down its production facility in North Canton due to a financial incentive to outsource work.

In 2008, North Canton withdrew from Plain Township by forming a paper township named Hoover Township.

== Geography ==
The West Branch of Nimishillen Creek flows through the city.

According to the United States Census Bureau, the city has a total area of 6.425 square miles (16.64 km^{2}), all land.

== Demographics ==
Historical population
Census	Pop.	Note	%±
1910	865		—
1920	1,597		84.6%
1930	2,648		65.8%
1940	2,988		12.8%
1950	4,032		34.9%
1960	7,727		91.6%
1970	15,228		97.1%
1980	14,189		−6.8%
1990	14,748		3.9%
2000	16,369		11.0%
2010	17,488		6.8%
2020	17,842		2.0%
2025 (est.)	17,692		−0.8%
U.S. Decennial Census; 2020 Census

According to realtor website Zillow, the average price of a home as of November 30, 2025, in North Canton is $277,559.

As of the 2023 American Community Survey, there are 8,271 estimated households in North Canton with an average of 2.00 persons per household. The city has a median household income of $72,193. Approximately 6.2% of the city's population lives at or below the poverty line. North Canton has an estimated 62.2% employment rate, with 38.1% of the population holding a bachelor's degree or higher and 97.8% holding a high school diploma. There were 8,552 housing units at an average density of 1,331.05 per square mile (513.9/km^{2}).

The top five reported languages (people were allowed to report up to two languages, thus the figures will generally add to more than 100%) were English (97.5%), Spanish (0.6%), Indo-European (1.5%), Asian and Pacific Islander (0.4%), and Other (0.0%).

The median age in the city was 45.9 years.

=== Racial and ethnic composition ===
North Canton, Ohio – racial and ethnic composition Note: the US Census treats Hispanic/Latino as an ethnic category. This table excludes Latinos from the racial categories and assigns them to a separate category. Hispanics/Latinos may be of any race.
Race / ethnicity (NH = non-Hispanic)	Pop. 1990	Pop. 2000	Pop. 2010	Pop. 2020	% 1990	% 2000	% 2010	% 2020
White alone (NH)	14,430	15,762	16,408	15,610	97.84%	96.29%	93.82%	87.49%
Black or African American alone (NH)	77	179	347	514	0.52%	1.09%	1.98%	2.88%
Native American or Alaska Native alone (NH)	10	11	22	25	0.07%	0.07%	0.13%	0.14%
Asian alone (NH)	133	169	200	255	0.90%	1.03%	1.14%	1.43%
Pacific Islander alone (NH)	—	0	4	3	—	0.00%	0.02%	0.02%
Other race alone (NH)	3	11	13	86	0.02%	0.07%	0.07%	0.48%
Mixed race or multiracial (NH)	—	103	235	701	—	0.63%	1.34%	3.93%
Hispanic or Latino (any race)	95	134	259	648	0.64%	0.82%	1.48%	3.63%
Total	14,748	16,369	17,488	17,842	100.00%	100.00%	100.00%	100.00%

=== 2024 estimate ===
As of the 2024 estimate, there were 17,677 people, 8,271 households, and _ families residing in the city. The population density was 2,751.28 inhabitants per square mile (1,062.3/km^{2}). There were 8,552 housing units at an average density of 1,331.05 per square mile (513.9/km^{2}). The racial makeup of the city was 94.7% White (94.5% NH White), 1.8% African American, 0.0% Native American, 0.6% Asian, 0.0% Pacific Islander, _% from some other races and 2.3% from two or more races. Hispanic or Latino people of any race were 1.6% of the population.

=== 2020 census ===
As of the 2020 census, there were 17,842 people in North Canton, with a median age of 42.2 years; 17.5% of residents were under the age of 18 and 23.8% were 65 years of age or older. For every 100 females there were 88.9 males, and for every 100 females age 18 and over there were 85.3 males. 100.0% of residents lived in urban areas, while 0.0% lived in rural areas.

There were 7,766 households in the city, of which 22.6% had children under the age of 18 living in them; 44.1% were married-couple households, 17.8% were households with a male householder and no spouse or partner present, and 31.8% were households with a female householder and no spouse or partner present. About 36.8% of all households were made up of individuals and 17.8% had someone living alone who was 65 years of age or older, with 4,427 families residing in the city. The population density was 2,788.25 inhabitants per square mile (1,076.5/km^{2}). There were 8,232 housing units at an average density of 1,286.45 per square mile (496.7/km^{2}), of which 5.7% were vacant; the homeowner vacancy rate was 0.9% and the rental vacancy rate was 9.0%.

Racial composition as of the 2020 census
Race	Number	Percent
White	15,745	88.2%
Black or African American	518	2.9%
American Indian and Alaska Native	35	0.2%
Asian	255	1.4%
Native Hawaiian and Other Pacific Islander	3	0.0%
Some other race	165	0.9%
Two or more races	1,121	6.3%
Hispanic or Latino (of any race)	648	3.6%

=== 2010 census ===
As of the 2010 census, there were 17,488 people, 7,557 households, and 4,426 families residing in the city. The population density was 2,732.50 inhabitants per square mile (1,055.0/km^{2}). There were 8,078 housing units at an average density of 1,262.19 per square mile (487.3/km^{2}). The racial makeup of the city was 94.84% White, 2.04% African American, 0.16% Native American, 1.14% Asian, 0.02% Pacific Islander, 0.34% from some other races and 1.46% from two or more races. Hispanic or Latino people of any race were 1.48% of the population.

There were 7,557 households, of which 23.9% had children under the age of 18 living with them, 46.2% were married couples living together, 9.2% had a female householder with no husband present, 3.1% had a male householder with no wife present, and 41.4% were non-families. 36.3% of all households were made up of individuals, and 17.2% had someone living alone who was 65 years of age or older. The average household size was 2.15 and the average family size was 2.82.

The median age in the city was 42.5 years. 18.6% of residents were under the age of 18; 12.2% were between the ages of 18 and 24; 21.8% were from 25 to 44; 25.8% were from 45 to 64; and 21.5% were 65 years of age or older. The gender makeup of the city was 46.3% male and 53.7% female.

Of the city's population over the age of 25, 34.3% hold a bachelor's degree or higher.

=== 2000 census ===
As of the 2000 census, there were 16,369 people, 7,114 households, and 4,382 families residing in the city. The population density was 2,697.1 inhabitants per square mile (1,041.4/km^{2}). There were 7,506 housing units at an average density of 1,236.8 per square mile (477.5/km^{2}). The racial makeup of the city was 96.90% White, 1.12% African American, 0.07% Native American, 1.04% Asian, 0.00% Pacific Islander, 0.18% from some other races and 0.69% from two or more races. Hispanic or Latino people of any race were 0.82% of the population.

There were 7,114 households, out of which 23.5% had children under the age of 18 living with them, 51.7% were married couples living together, 7.5% had a female householder with no husband present, and 38.4% were non-families. 33.8% of all households were made up of individuals, and 15.2% had someone living alone who was 65 years of age or older. The average household size was 2.18 and the average family size was 2.80.

In the city, the population was spread out, with 19.3% under the age of 18, 9.5% from 18 to 24, 25.1% from 25 to 44, 23.6% from 45 to 64, and 22.6% who were 65 years of age or older. The median age was 42 years. For every 100 females, there were 87.5 males. For every 100 females age 18 and over, there were 83.1 males.

The median income for a household in the city was $42,013, and the median income for a family was $53,268. Males had a median income of $39,517 versus $29,250 for females. The per capita income for the city was $24,045. About 3.5% of families and 5.7% of the population were below the poverty line, including 7.7% of those under age 18 and 5.6% of those age 65 or over.

== Economy ==
Companies headquartered in North Canton include the Timken Company, a global manufacturer of bearings and power transmission products; Diebold Nixdorf, a multinational financial and retail technology company; and the Kenan Advantage Group, a bulk cargo trucking company. Cargo airline Castle Aviation is also based in the city, as was former charter airline Ultimate Jet.

== Government ==
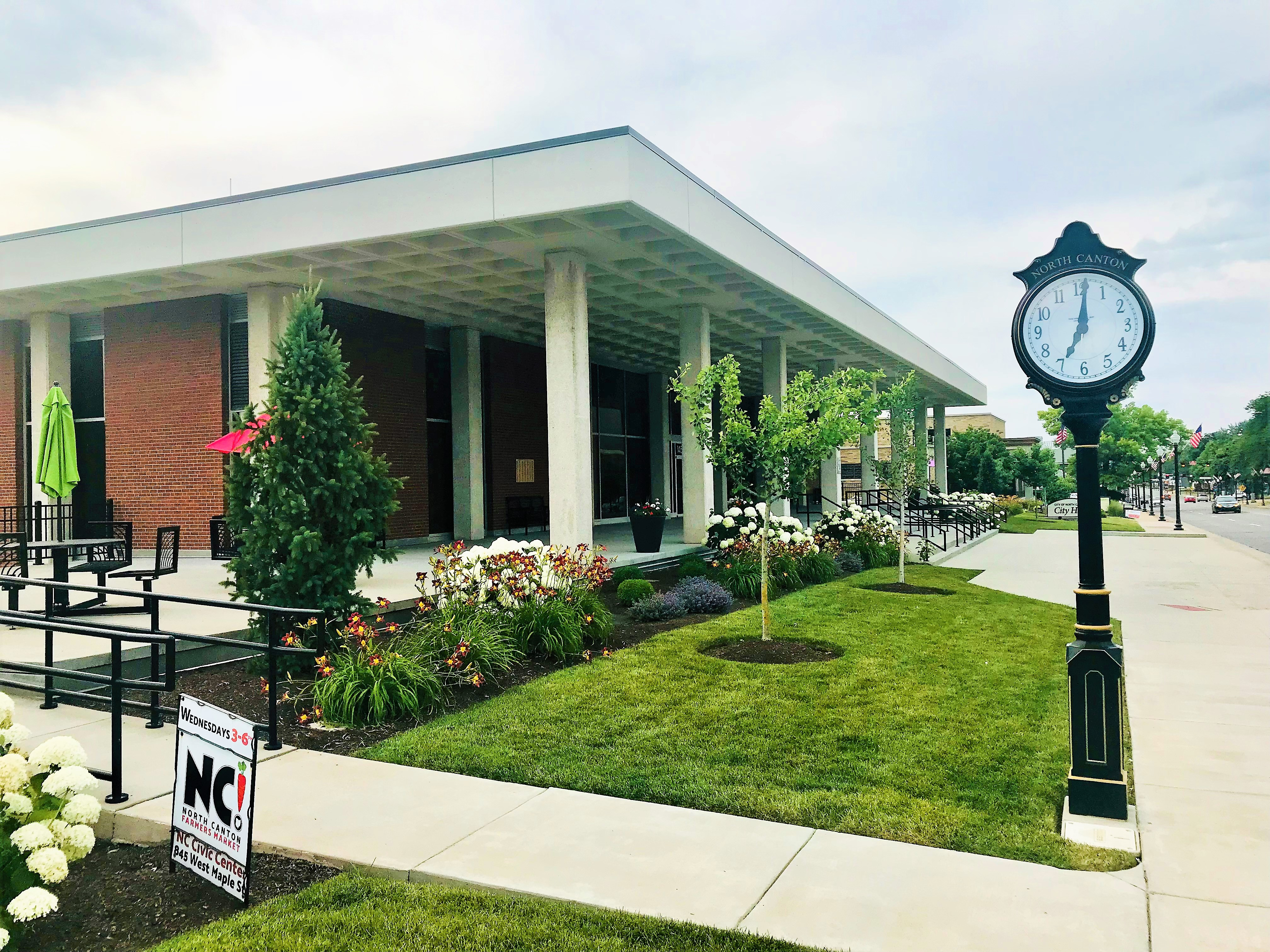
North Canton City Hall

The current mayor of North Canton is Matthew Stroia, who became mayor on July 25, 2025. North Canton City Council consists of three at-large seats and four ward districts.

The city is in Ohio's 13th congressional District, which since 2023 is represented by Democrat Emilia Sykes. North Canton is in Ohio House of Representatives District 48, represented by Republican and North Canton resident Scott Oelslager. In the Ohio Senate, North Canton is in the 29th district, represented by Republican senator Jane Timken.

== Education ==
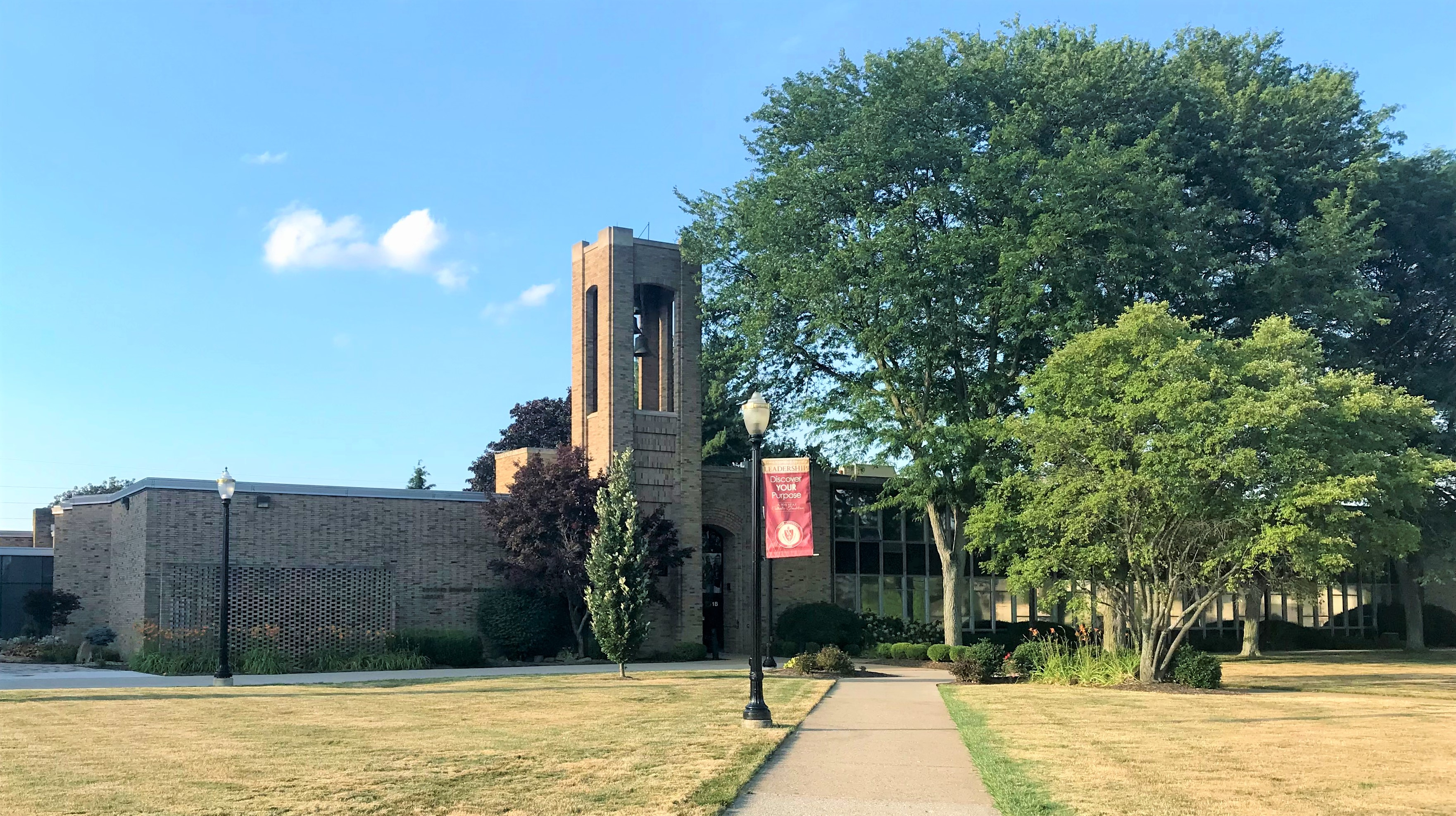
Walsh University

Most students attend North Canton City Schools, which consists of North Canton Primary School, North Canton Intermediate School, North Canton Middle School and North Canton Hoover High School. Also in the city limits is St. Paul School, which offers a private, parochial education, in the Catholic tradition, for students in grades K–8.

Walsh University is a private, Catholic university that offers undergraduate and graduate degrees. Enrollment is about 2,500. Men's and women's athletic teams are members of the NCAA Division II and Great Midwest Athletic Conference.

Plain Local Schools and Jackson Local Schools also exist in the 44720 zip code.

== Notable people ==
- Todd Blackledge, professional football player and television sports analyst
- Joe DeRosa, official in the National Basketball Association
- Jehu Grubb, pioneer settler and politician
- Diana Al-Hadid, Syrian-born American artist
- Marty Lee Hoenes, rock musician
- Ray Kolp, professional baseball player
- Eddie McClintock, actor
- Tony Migliozzi, ultra-marathoner and 2015 IAU 50 km World Champion
- Jeffrey Mylett, actor and songwriter
- Dick Snyder, professional basketball player
- Rabbit Warstler, professional baseball player
