= Girard High School =

Location
- 1244 Shannon Road; Girard, Ohio 44420; United States; 41°10′17″N 80°41′33″W

Information
- Type: Public
- Established: 1861
- School district: Girard City School District
- CEEB code: 362315
- NCES School ID: 390440601005
- Principal: Sam Caputo
- Teaching staff: 35.00 (FTE)
- Grades: 9–12
- Enrollment: 421 (2024–25)
- Student to teacher ratio: 12.03
- Campus type: Large suburb
- Colors: Red and black
- Athletics conference: Northeast 8 Athletic Conference
- Team name: Indians
- Yearbook: Reflector
- Website: www.girardcityschools.org/high-school/

Girard High School is a public high school in Girard, Ohio, United States. It is the only high school in the Girard City School District. Athletic teams compete as the Girard Indians as a member of the Ohio High School Athletic Association in the Northeast 8 Athletic Conference

== History ==
Girard High School opened in 1861, originally housed in the Girard Union School. The original campus was used until 1925, when Girard opened a new high school on North Ward Avenue. The Union School campus was demolished in 1938.

After 85 years of use, in May 2007, voters approved a $3.8 million levy, with the state of Ohio paying $26 million to replace the aging North Ward Avenue campus. Girard began construction on their new junior/senior high school campus in 2010, located at 1244 Shannon Road, a previously undeveloped 25-acre (10 ha) property, which was annexed by Girard from Liberty Township. The new 130,000-square-foot (12,000 m^{2}) facility was opened beginning the 2010–11 school year. The campus features 47 classrooms, 4 computer laboratories, and athletic facilities including 2 gyms. The former North Ward Avenue building was demolished in 2011. In 2022 the school board named Scott Libert, a former teacher as principal of the school after the former principal was promoted to supervisor of the district's Continuity of Service plan.

== Athletics ==
Girard High School currently offers:

- Baseball
- Basketball
- Bowling
- Cheerleading
- Cross country
- Golf
- Football
- Soccer
- Softball
- Swimming
- Tennis
- Track and field
- Volleyball
- Wrestling

=== State championships ===
- Boys basketball – 1993
- Boys cross country – 1998, 2000
- Girls track and field – 1980
