= Northeast 8 Athletic Conference =

High school athletic conference in Ohio U.S.

The Northeast 8 Athletic Conference is an Ohio High School Athletic Association athletic league that began competition for the 2018–19 school year and is made up of member schools from Trumbull and Mahoning counties in Ohio.

== Members ==
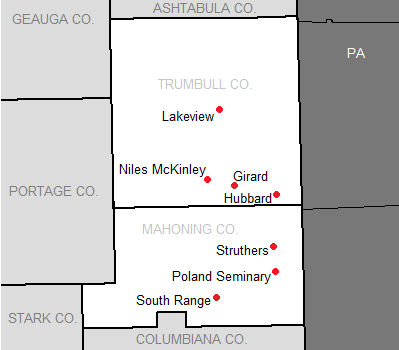
Northeast 8 Athletic Conference as of 2022

School	Nickname	Location	Colors	Tenure
Girard	Indians	Girard	Black, red	2018–
Hubbard	Eagles	Hubbard	Blue, silver	2018–
Lakeview	Bulldogs	Cortland	Blue, white	2018–
Niles McKinley	Red Dragons	Niles	Red, blue	2018–
Poland Seminary	Bulldogs	Poland	Blue, white	2018–
South Range	Raiders	Canfield	Burgundy, gold	2018–
Struthers	Wildcats	Struthers	Red, white	2018–

=== Future members ===
School	Nickname	Location	Colors	Year joining	Notes
Salem	Quakers	Salem	Red, black	2027	Joining from Eastern Buckeye Conference for all sports except football

== Former members ==
School	Nickname	Location	Colors	Tenure	Notes
Jefferson Area	Falcons	Jefferson	Red, black	2018–2023	Left for Chagrin Valley Conference

== History ==
The idea for the NE8 was created in May 2017 when members of the All-American Conference's Blue and White divisions decided to break away and form their own league. South Range was previously set to join the newly created Eastern Buckeye Conference in 2018, but then received an invitation to join the AAC Blue tier with Crestview High School at the same time they were invited to join the NE8. With three league invitations, South Range decided to help form the Northeast 8.

Jefferson announced in 2022 that they would be leaving the NE8 after five years to join the Chagrin Valley Conference effective the 2023–24 school year.

West Branch and Salem, both of the Eastern Buckeye Conference, applied to join the Northeast 8 in February 2026, after several members of the EBC announced their intended departure following the 2028–29 school year, to help form the Northeast Senate League. On March 13, 2026, the Northeast 8 declined their applications, citing "it was not in the best interest of the conferences core members at this time." Around this time, Crestview of the Mahoning Valley Athletic Conference also applied to join the Northeast 8, but were denied as well. Salem was accepted into the Northeast 8, after previously being denied in May 2026, and is expected to join beginning the 2027–28 school year.
