= Minerva High School (Ohio) =

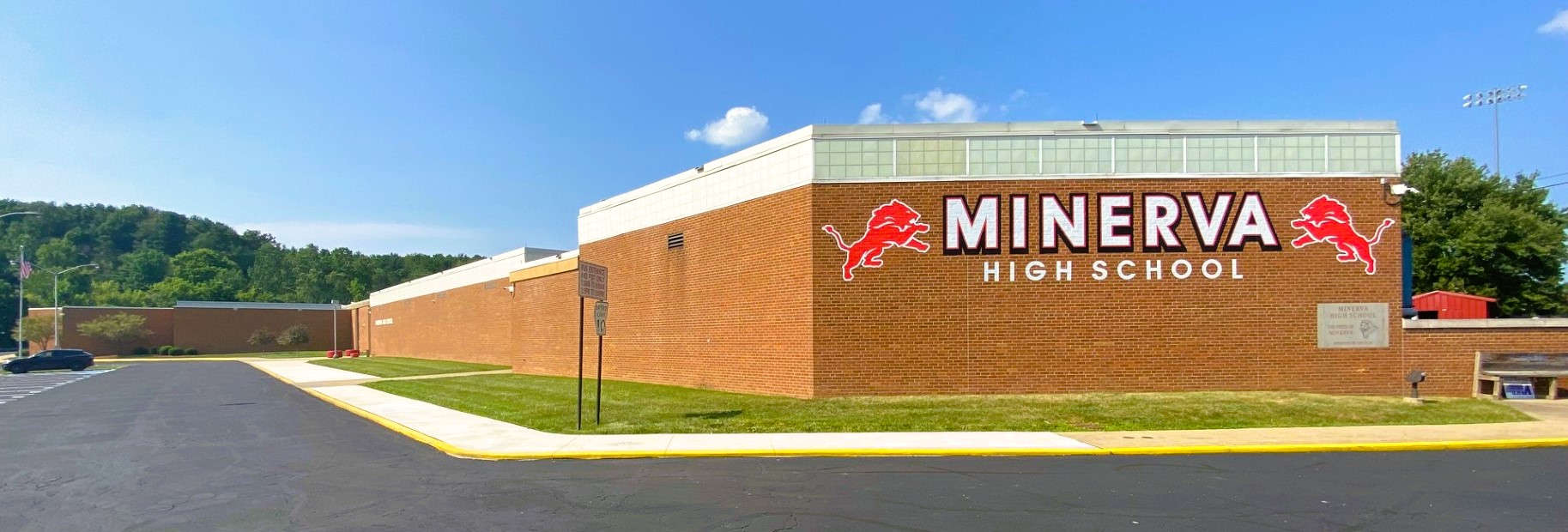

Location
- 501 Almeda Drive; Minerva, Ohio 44657; United States; 40°44′08″N 81°05′52″W

Information
- Type: Public high school
- Established: 1915
- School district: Minerva Local School District
- Superintendent: Gary Chaddock
- CEEB code: 363470
- Principal: Andrew Mangun
- Teaching staff: 25.86 (FTE)
- Grades: 9-12
- Enrollment: 447 (2023-2024)
- Student to teacher ratio: 17.29
- Campus type: Fringe Town
- Colors: Crimson and gray
- Athletics conference: Eastern Buckeye Conference
- Mascot: Lion
- Team name: Lions
- Rival: Carrollton Warriors
- Website: mhs.mlsd.sparcc.org/o/mhs

Minerva High School is a public high school in Minerva, Ohio, United States. It is the only high school in the Minerva Local School District. Athletic teams compete as the Minerva Lions in the Ohio High School Athletic Association as a member of the Eastern Buckeye Conference.

== Athletics ==
=== State Championships ===
Girls' Cross Country (3): 2021, 2022, 2023

== Notable alumni ==
- Jeff Wallace - former MLB pitcher for the Pittsburgh Pirates and the Tampa Bay Devil Rays
- Carol Costello - American news anchor and former host of CNN Newsroom
