= Ohio high school athletic conferences =

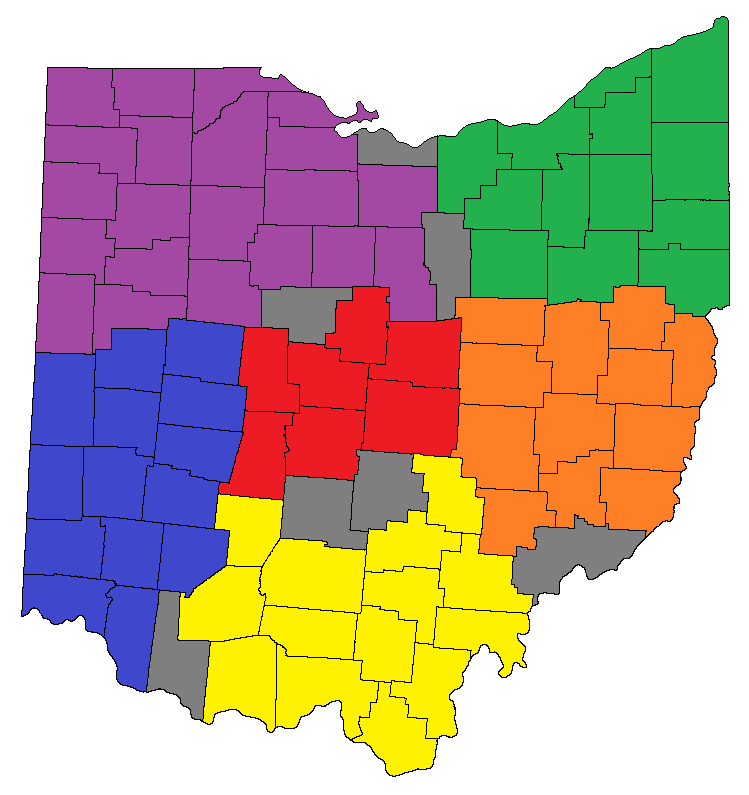
The six OHSAA regions with the Central in red, the East in orange, Northeast in green, Northwest in purple, South in yellow, and Southwest in blue. Counties that are in gray are split between two regions.

This is a list of high school athletic conferences in Ohio, separated by Ohio High School Athletic Association (OHSAA) region. Some conferences have schools in multiple regions, and will be listed in all applicable regions. However, the conference information is on the region page where the most schools are classified in.

Conference membership in Ohio is voluntary, rather than assigned by the state association like in some states. While this ensures that many rivalries stay intact regardless of classification changes, it also means schools can choose to change conferences pending acceptance into a different conference, or in rare cases, can be forced out of a conference. This can explain why some conferences have a lengthy list of former members, and the number of defunct conferences.

== Central Region ==
This region includes the counties of Delaware, Franklin, Knox, Licking, Madison, Morrow, and Union, as well as schools within Fairfield, Marion, and Pickaway counties. While the Central Region includes a small number of conferences, many of these leagues contain many schools with multiple divisions.

- Central Buckeye League
- Central Catholic League
- Columbus City League
- Knox-Morrow Athletic Conference
- Licking County League
- Mid-Ohio Athletic Conference
- Mid-Ohio Christian Athletic League
- Mid-State League
- Ohio Capital Conference

== East/Southeast Regions ==
The East region includes the counties of Belmont, Carroll, Coshocton, Guernsey, Harrison, Holmes, Jefferson, Monroe, Morgan, Muskingum, Noble, and Tuscarawas, as well as schools within Washington County. The Southeast region includes the counties of Adams, Athens, Fayette, Gallia, Highland, Hocking, Jackson, Lawrence, Meigs, Perry, Pike, Ross, Scioto, and Vinton, as well as schools within Brown, Fairfield, Pickaway, and Washington counties. Due to the low amount of conferences separately, and the number of conferences that contain members of both regions, these two regions are combined onto one page.

- Buckeye 8 Athletic League
- Frontier Athletic Conference
- Inter-Valley Conference
- Mid- Ohio Valley Conference
- Muskingum Valley League
- Ohio Valley Athletic Conference
- Ohio Valley Conference
- Pioneer Valley Conference
- Scioto Valley Conference
- Southern Hills Athletic Conference
- Southern Ohio Conference
- Tri-Valley Conference

== Northeast Region ==
This region includes the counties of Ashtabula, Columbiana, Cuyahoga, Geauga, Lake, Lorain, Mahoning, Medina, Portage, Stark, Summit, Trumbull, and Wayne, as well as schools within Ashland and Erie counties.

- Akron City Series
- All-American Conference
- Chagrin Valley Conference
- Cleveland Senate Athletic League
- Cleveland West Conference
- Eastern Buckeye Conference
- Eastern Ohio Athletic Conference
- Federal League
- Greater Cleveland Conference
- Independents
- Lake Erie League
- Lorain County League
- Metro Athletic Conference
- Mahoning Valley Athletic Conference
- North Coast League
- Northeastern Athletic Conference
- Northeast 8 Athletic Conference
- Northern 8 Football Conference
- Principals Athletic Conference
- Southwestern Conference
- Suburban League
- Wayne County Athletic League
- Western Reserve Conference

== Northwest Region ==
This region includes the counties of Allen, Auglaize, Crawford, Defiance, Fulton, Hancock, Hardin, Henry, Huron, Lucas, Mercer, Ottawa, Paulding, Putnam, Richland, Sandusky, Seneca, Van Wert, Williams, Wood, and Wyandot, as well as schools within Ashland, Erie, and Marion counties.

- Blanchard Valley Conference
- Buckeye Border Conference
- Firelands Conference
- Green Meadows Conference
- Mid-Buckeye Conference
- Midwest Athletic Conference
- Northern 10 Athletic Conference
- Northern 8 Football Conference
- Northern Buckeye Conference
- Northern Lakes League
- Northwest Central Conference
- Northwest Conference
- Northwest Ohio Athletic League
- Northwest Ohio Catholic School Association
- Ohio Cardinal Conference
- Putnam County League
- Sandusky Bay Conference
- Toledo Area Athletic Conference
- Toledo City League
- Western Buckeye League
- Western Ohio Soccer Conference

== Southwest Region ==
This region includes the counties of Butler, Champaign, Clark, Clermont, Clinton, Darke, Greene, Hamilton, Logan, Miami, Montgomery, Preble, Shelby, and Warren, as well as schools within Brown County.

- Central Buckeye Conference
- Cincinnati Hills League
- Cincinnati Metro Athletic Conference
- Dayton City League
- Eastern Cincinnati Conference
- Greater Catholic League
- Greater Miami Conference
- Greater Western Ohio Conference
- Independents
- Metro Buckeye Conference
- Miami Valley Conference
- Miami Valley League
- Ohio Heritage Conference
- Shelby County Athletic League
- Southern Buckeye Athletic/Academic Conference
- Southwest Ohio Conference
- Southwestern Buckeye League
- Three Rivers Conference
- Western Ohio Athletic Conference
