= Marlington High School =

School in Ohio, United States

Coordinates: 40°55′22″N 81°10′52″W

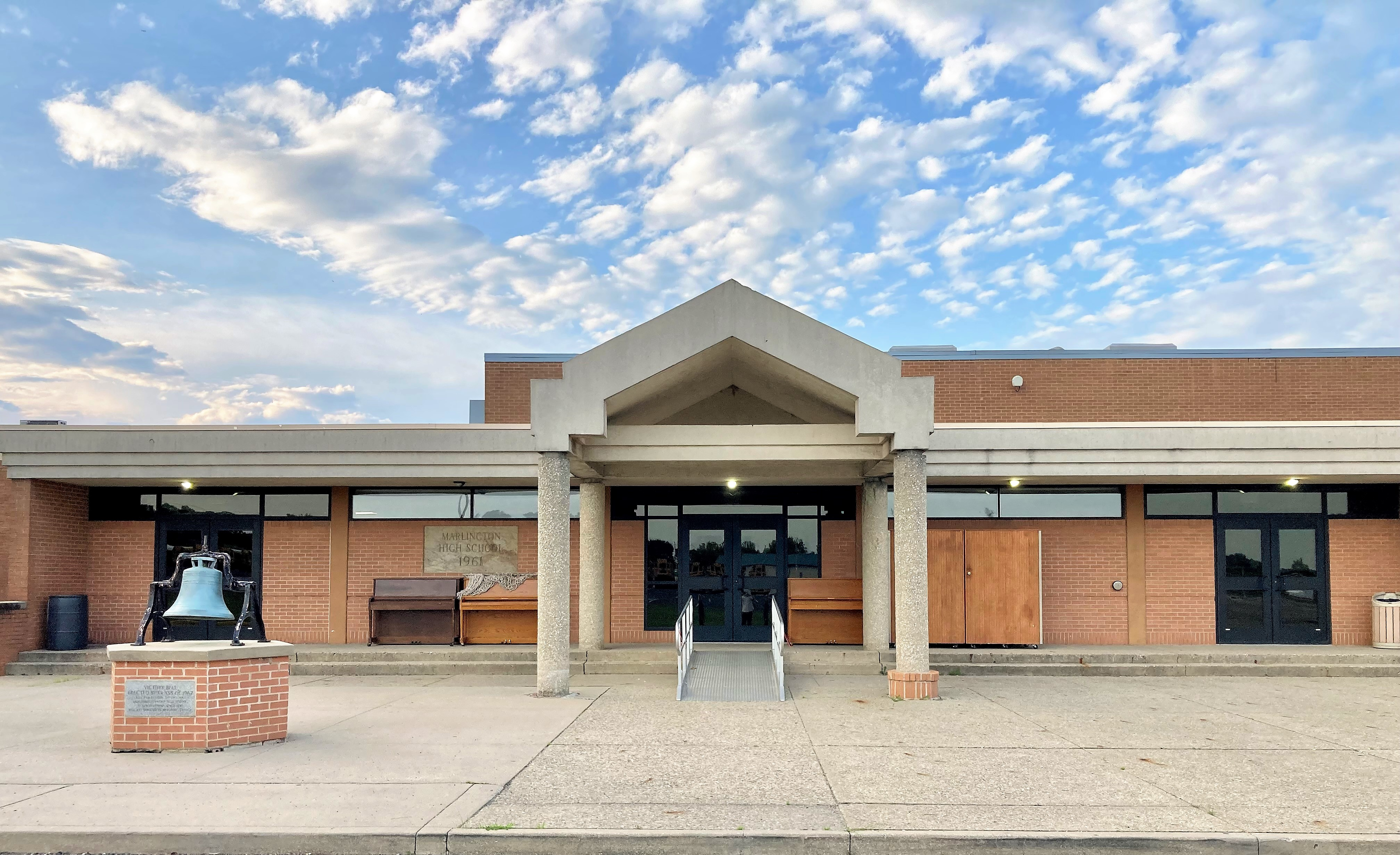

Location
- 10450 Moulin Avenue Northeast; Alliance, (Stark County), Ohio 44601; United States

Information
- Type: Public high school
- Principal: Mike Farrell
- Staff: 36.60 (FTE)
- Enrollment: 707 (2023-2024)
- Student to teacher ratio: 19.32
- Colors: Orange and black
- Athletics conference: Eastern Buckeye Conference
- Nickname: Dukes

Marlington High School is a public high school in Lexington Township, Ohio near Alliance. It is the only high school in the Marlington Local School District. The name is a portmanteau of Marlboro and Lexington or Washington townships, and the district actually covers those mostly rural areas and northern, western, and southern parts of Alliance itself (the middle and high schools are located just outside the city limits, and there is an elementary school in each of the three townships). Marlington's sports teams are nicknamed the Dukes. The sports affiliation is the Eastern Buckeye Conference.

== Notable alumni ==
- Zach Dezenzo, professional baseball player in Major League Baseball (MLB)
- Paul Stuffel, former professional baseball player in Major League Baseball (MLB)
- Dymonte Thomas, former professional football player in the National Football League (NFL)
- Luke Witte, former professional basketball player in the National Basketball Association (NBA), church minister

== Athletics ==
=== State championships ===
- Softball – 1996
- Boys cross country – 2021, 2022, 2023
