= Hastings Middle School =

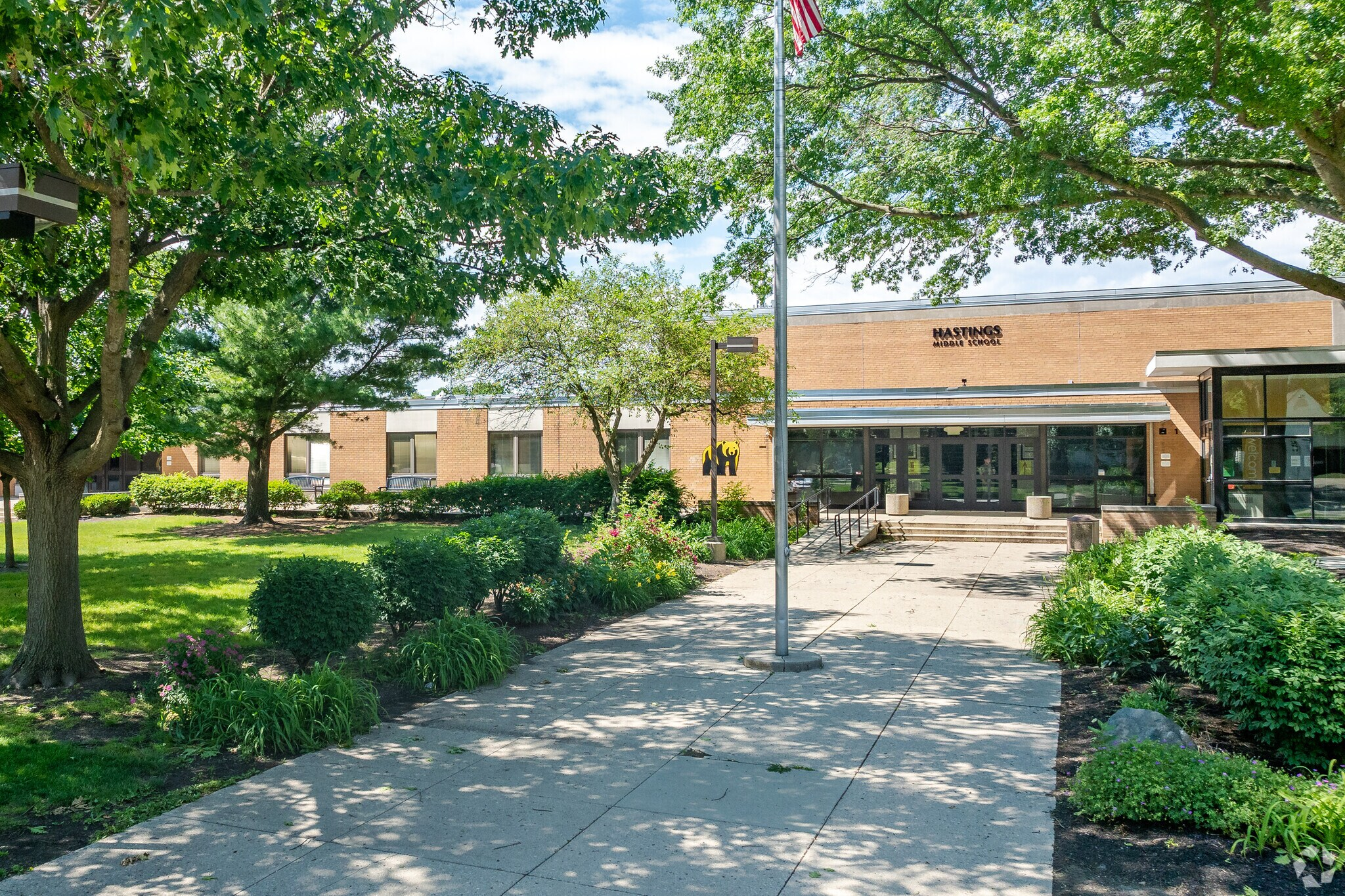

Location
- 1850 Hastings Lane; Upper Arlington, Ohio 43220; United States; 40°1′58″N 83°4′5″W

Information
- Type: Public middle school
- Established: 1961
- School district: Upper Arlington City School District
- NCES School ID: 390449301863
- Faculty: ~32 FTE
- Grades: 6–8
- Enrollment: ~720 (2023–24)
- Colors: Gold and Black
- Mascot: Golden Bears
- USNWR ranking: Ranked #79 out of middle schools in Ohio
- Website: hastings.uaschools.org

Hastings Middle School is a public middle school located in Upper Arlington, Ohio, a northwest suburb of Columbus. It is part of the Upper Arlington City School District and serves students in grades 6 through 8. Since opening in 1961, the school has grown to enroll approximately 720 students and is one of two middle schools in the district, alongside Jones Middle School, feeding into Upper Arlington High School.

== History ==
The Upper Arlington City School District was founded in 1918, when residents of the newly incorporated village petitioned the Franklin County Board of Education to establish an independent school district. The district's first permanent building and former Camp Willis is now known as Jones Middle School. It opened to grades 1-6 on March 24, 1924 and grades 7-12 in 1928. As Upper Arlington's population expanded through the mid-twentieth century, the district required additional facilities to accommodate its growing student body.

Hastings Middle School opened in 1961. The school takes its name from Hastings Lane, the street on which it sits. Graduates of Hastings proceed to Upper Arlington High School, the district's sole high school, which shares the Golden Bear mascot and black-and-gold colors with the wider district.

== Academics ==
Hastings Middle School offers a comprehensive academic program aligned with Ohio's Learning Standards, covering core subjects including English language arts, mathematics, science, and social studies. The school provides a Gifted and Talented program as well as a Project Lead The Way (PLTW) curriculum, a nationally recognized STEM-focused sequence designed to develop critical thinking and problem-solving skills in pre-engineering and biomedical contexts.

84% of students scored at or above the proficient level in mathematics and 81% in reading on state assessments, placing the school among the highest-performing middle schools in Ohio. U.S. News ranked Hastings 79th among all Ohio middle schools. SchoolDigger placed the school 66th out of 1,046 Ohio public middle schools, noting particularly strong outcomes for students of both genders, multi-racial students, and students with disabilities.

For the 2023–24 school year, the school reported 720 students and approximately 32 full-time equivalent classroom teachers, yielding a student-to-teacher ratio of roughly 22:1. Three full-time school counselors support the social-emotional and academic needs of students, working collaboratively with teachers, administrators, and families.

== Extracurricular activities ==
The school offers a wide range of extracurricular and co-curricular opportunities spanning the arts, community service, and student leadership. Community service and service-learning experiences are an important element of the Hastings program, as part of a district initiative of developing students who are uniquely accomplished and prepared to serve, lead, and succeed. The school's music and arts programs offer students performance and creative outlets across multiple disciplines. Students also participate in a variety of clubs and interest-based activities throughout the academic year.

Hastings Middle School fields interscholastic athletic teams under the Golden Bears nickname, competing in a range of sports throughout the school year. Offered sports include baseball, boys and girls basketball, boys and girls cross country, field hockey, football, soccer, volleyball, and wrestling, among others.
