= UA Archives (Upper Arlington, Ohio) =

Coordinates: 40°00′45″N 83°04′06″W

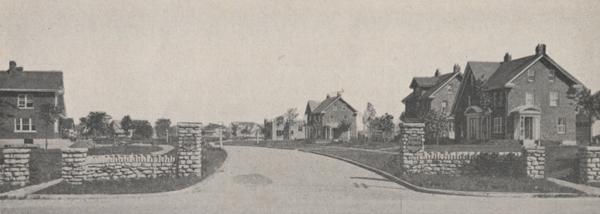
A stone entryway and newly built houses mark the entrance to Upper Arlington at the intersection of Fifth Avenue and Cambridge Boulevard in 1918.

The UA Archives program provides access to materials related to the culture and history of Upper Arlington, Ohio, and is part of the Upper Arlington Public Library's digital library initiative. Free online access to these materials via the UA Archives website is provided in accordance with the Library's mission to help the community explore Upper Arlington's heritage and grow through a lifetime of learning.

Through the UA Archives, the Library cultivates ongoing partnerships with the Upper Arlington Historical Society, the City of Upper Arlington, community organizations, and individuals to digitize items of historical interest and make them available to the public. By working with the Historical Society and other community groups, the UA Archives digital library initiative supports the goal of preserving Upper Arlington's history as well as the Upper Arlington Historic District's listing on the National Register of Historic Places.

== Mission statement ==
The goal of the UA Archives digital library program is to preserve original documents, photographs, maps, and other media related to the history and culture of Upper Arlington, Ohio, while offering increased visibility and improved access to these valuable primary reference sources.

== History ==
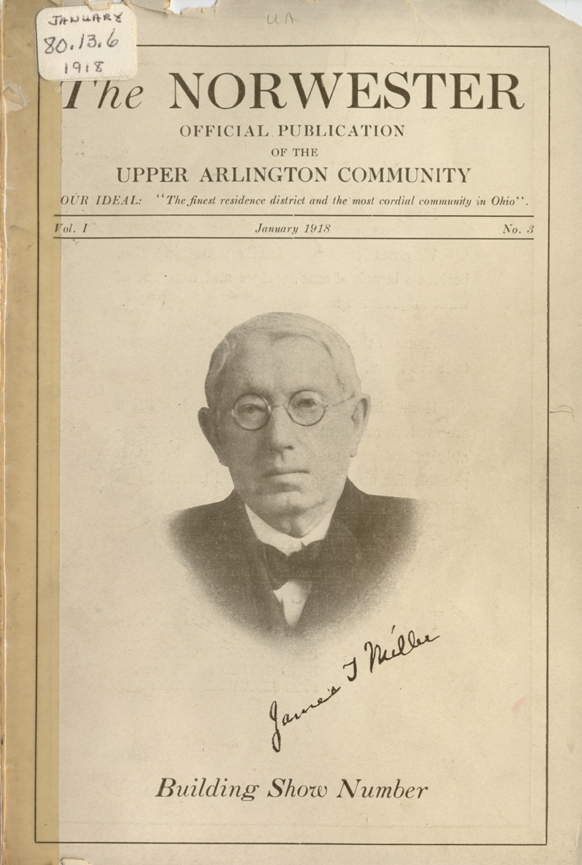
The Norwester magazine was published monthly in Upper Arlington, Ohio, from November 1917 through March 1922 and chronicled early suburban life. (read this issue >)

The Upper Arlington Public Library began preliminary work on their digitization program in November 2002. These initial preparations included researching existing digital library initiatives and standards. Digitization program management was appointed, a formal collection development plan was drafted, and potential users, partnerships, and program goals were identified. Through the UA Archives, the Library would lend their expertise to other community organizations and individuals by digitizing, cataloging, and providing access to historically and culturally significant materials related to Upper Arlington.

The Upper Arlington Historical Society was a natural choice as the first community organization with which the Library would partner. The Society and its members play an active role in the community, which is also a reflection of residents' interest in the history of their city. In addition to their local history archives, the Historical Society maintains preservation guidelines; a historical home inventory; and the Upper Arlington Wall of Honor, a tribute to notable area residents. Due to the volunteer nature of the organization, however, the rich resources of the Historical Society were not always easily accessible to the community. The Library approached the Upper Arlington Historical Society in the spring of 2003 with an offer to digitize and provide online access to their holdings. In November of that year the Library penned a formal agreement with the Historical Society.

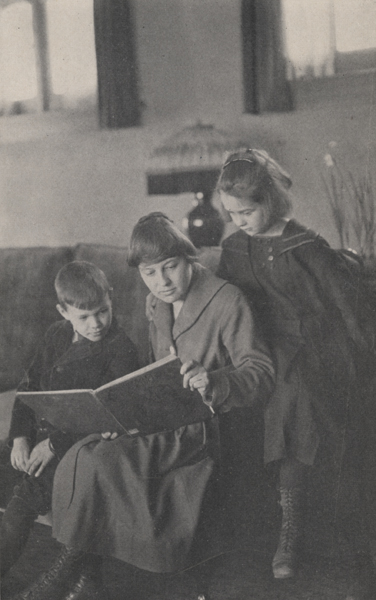
Mary Boyer, the first teacher in Upper Arlington, held class in the basement of King Thompson's home. (view this photo >)

The UA Archives website launched on September 15, 2004, after two years of planning and over 1,500 hours of work. At that time it included historical photographs depicting little known facts about early life in the community. One photograph shows the Marble Cliff Depot, a railroad station known originally as the Scioto Depot. This station house served the Upper Arlington area until the late 1920s and was located on the south side of Fifth Avenue just east of the Pennsylvania tracks, near the present day entrance to First Community Village. Another photograph shows the first teacher and students in Upper Arlington at a time when classes were held in the basement of the home of King Thompson, one of Upper Arlington's founders. Yet another captures a scene from Camp Willis, a military training camp located in Upper Arlington during the community's early development in 1916. Ohio Guardsmen were trained at this camp to defend the United States against cross-border attacks from Pancho Villa's Mexican troops.

The debut of the UA Archives website also included approximately 2,000 pages of text and photographs from the Norwester magazine, the original community newspaper, published from November 1917 through March 1922. Among other topics, the Norwester magazine covered local residents, homes, schools, sports, and daily life. The magazine also included first-hand accounts of World War I, received from local residents stationed in Europe, and chronicled life on the home front as community members bought Liberty Bonds and war savings stamps, planted backyard war gardens, and debated the patriotic virtues of continuing to spend their money versus saving.

== Collection Development ==
Upper Arlington Public Library staff select materials for the UA Archives, subject to the policies and mandates of the Library's Board of Trustees. The UA Archives program actively solicits materials relating to the history of Upper Arlington, Ohio, from local government, community organizations, businesses, and individuals. Historical materials in all formats are considered and may consist of photographs, documents, arts and crafts, and audio or video recordings. Selection criteria include historical significance and relevance of the subject or its depiction of daily life, the educational or entertainment value of the subject, and the availability of sufficient and reliable descriptions of the material. All items must either be in the public domain or have written copyright permissions granted before inclusion in the UA Archives.

The UA Archives encourages the digitization of items even if a potential donor wishes to retain the original source materials. In this case, the original items remain in the ownership of the donor, and the Upper Arlington Public Library assumes ownership of the digital representations. When materials are acquired through permanent donation, the Library encourages the transfer of original items to the Upper Arlington Historical Society for permanent storage after the digitization process has been completed.

In addition to the Norwester magazines and historical photographs included when the UA Archives site launched, new materials are continually incorporated. The City of Upper Arlington has provided maps depicting the community's annexation history and historic district, and the Library has added historic 1880s plat maps from its own collection. The Library has also partnered with the Upper Arlington City School District, which granted permission for digitization of the Upper Arlington High School yearbooks from 1923–present. All volumes through 1999 were added to the UA Archives site on October 7, 2009, with one subsequent volume to be added each year. Oral histories from early residents and local war veterans will also eventually be added to the UA Archives site.

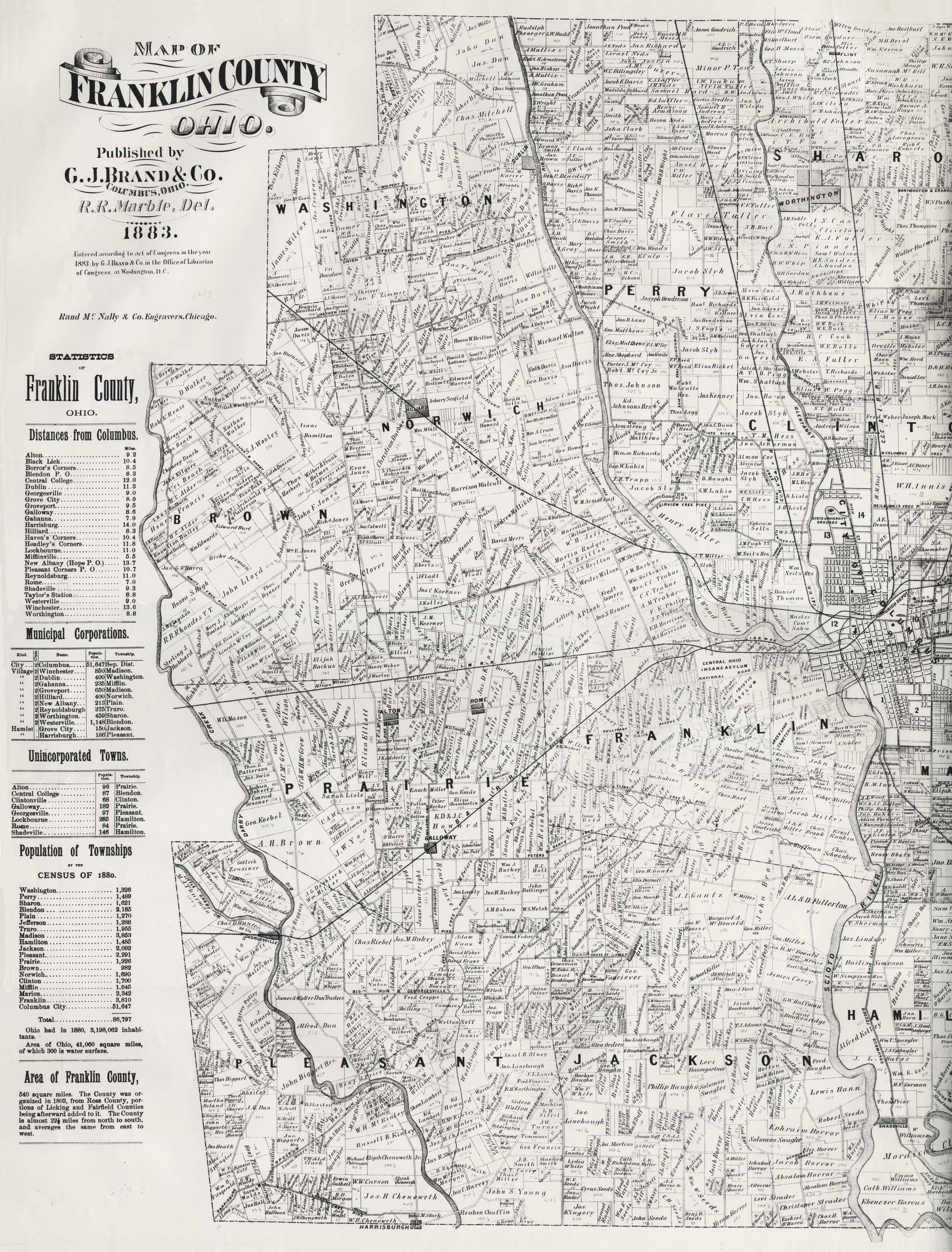
Map of Franklin County, Ohio (1883).
(view this map >)

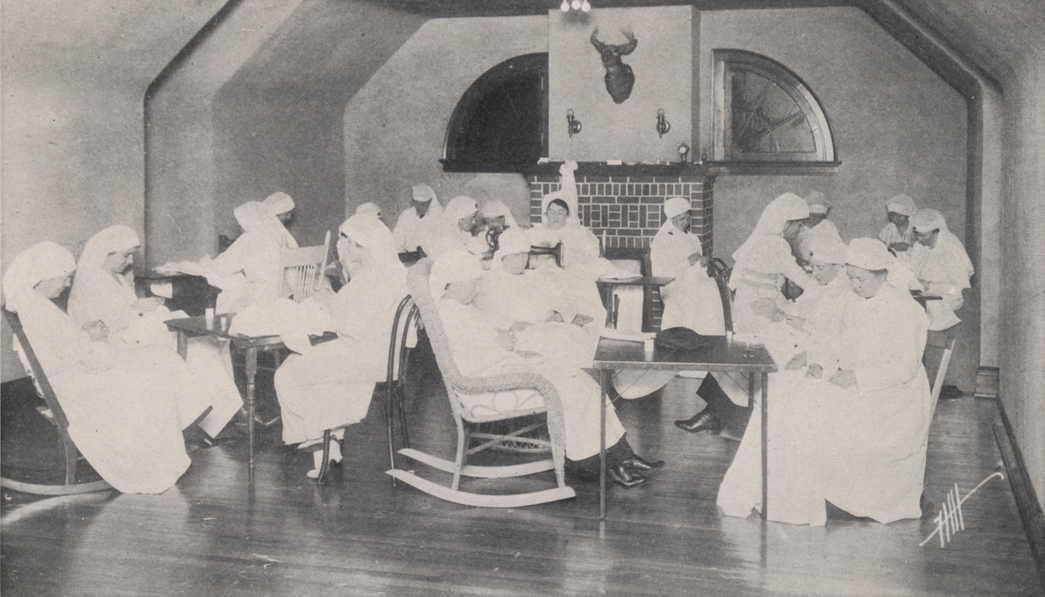
Upper Arlington World War I Red Cross Unit (c. 1918).
(view this photo >)

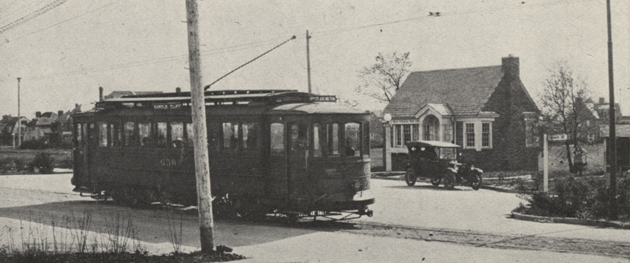
Trolley Line Terminus at Miller Park (c. 1921).
(view this photo >)

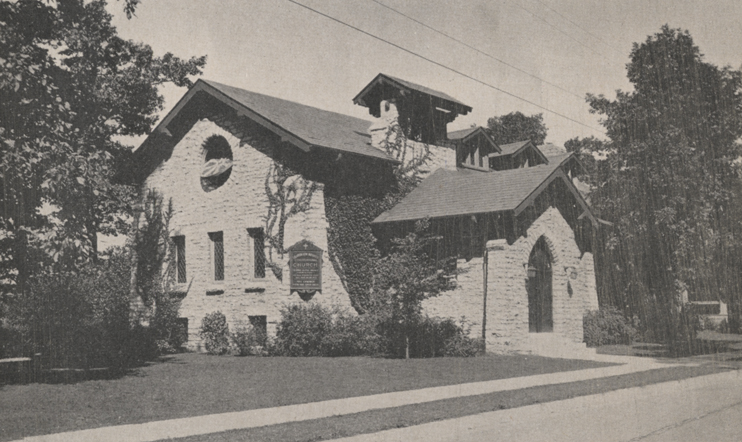
First Community Church, Lincoln Road Chapel (c. 1917).
(read the full article >)

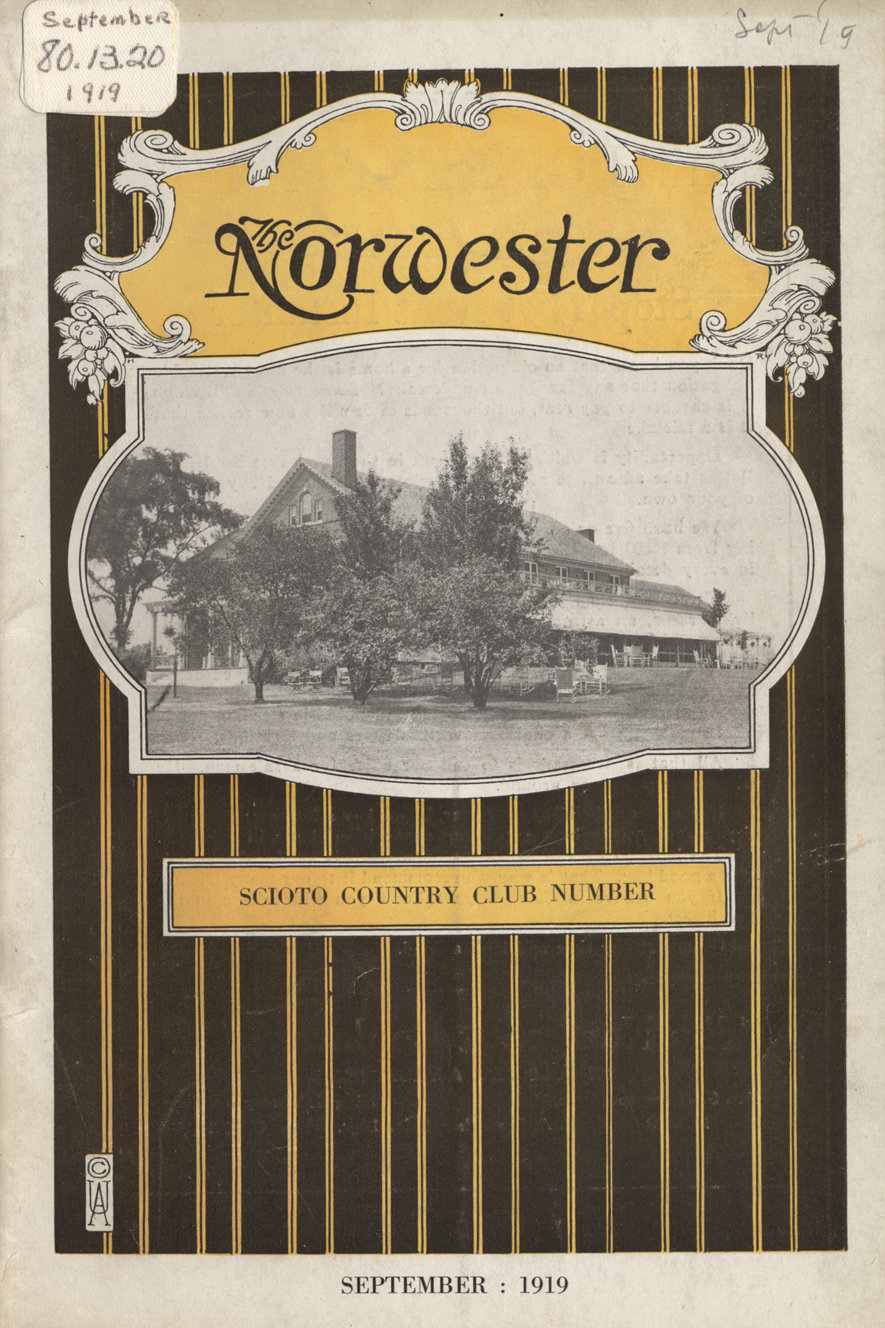
Scioto Country Club (Norwester, September 1919).
(read this issue >)

== Technical information ==
Photographs and most text-based items in the UA Archives collection have been scanned by Upper Arlington Public Library staff and volunteers as 600 dpi TIFF files with 24-bit color using an Epson Expression 1640XL 11" x 17" flatbed scanner. Optical character recognition (OCR) was performed using OmniPage Pro, and low-resolution JPEG files were generated for onscreen display. CONTENTdm is used as the digital collection management software for the UA Archives project, and Adobe Photoshop is used for image manipulation, rotation, and cropping. Starting in 2009, derivative lossless JPEG2000 images, OCR text (using ABBYY FineReader), and PDF files are generated via CONTENTdm.
