= Union Cemetery (Columbus) =

Historic cemetery in Franklin County, Ohio

Details
- Established: 1847
- Location: Columbus, Ohio
- Country: United States
- Coordinates: 40°01′13″N 83°01′21″W
- Owned by: Union Cemetery Association
- No. of interments: >66,000
- Website: https://www.unioncemeterycolumbus.com
- Find a Grave: Union Cemetery

Union Cemetery is a historic cemetery on Olentangy River Road near Riverside Methodist Hospital in Columbus, Ohio. Owing to its location near the Ohio State University, it has been the chosen resting place for numerous Buckeye luminaries and Columbus politicians.

== History ==
Balser Hess, a veteran of the American Revolutionary War, established a farm on the site in the early 19th century. Hess is thought to be the first burial there, in 1806. It was established as a public cemetery in 1847.

The cemetery lies just east of State Route 315, and is responsible for that highway's infamous "hospital curve." The Ohio Department of Transportation had sought for years to seize cemetery land for the road, but the Supreme Court of Ohio sided with the cemetery. Eventually a compromise was reached resulting in a short east–west leg of the route running between the cemetery to the south and Riverside Hospital to the north.

== Notable burials ==
Notable individuals buried at the cemetery include:

- Myron B. Gessaman, Mayor of Columbus
- Hank Gowdy, Professional baseball player for New York Giants and Boston Braves
- Chic Harley, Ohio State football player
- Woody Hayes, Ohio State football coach
- Paul M. Herbert, Three-time Lieutenant Governors of Ohio, Ohio Supreme Court Justice
- Arthur G. James, Surgeon, founder of The James Cancer Hospital
- Benny Kauff, Professional baseball player for New York Giants
- Hank Marr Jazz Musician
- Nichole C. Thiele, Miss Ohio U.S.A. International 1988
- Joel Parsons, Civil War recipient of the Medal of Honor
- Buck Rinehart, Mayor of Columbus
- Lynn St. John, Ohio State basketball coach
- Fred Taylor, Ohio State basketball player and coach
- Dave Thomas, Founder of Wendy's
- Nathan A. McCoy, United States Postmaster at Columbus, Ohio
