= Dave Thomas (businessman) =

Founder of Wendy's (1932–2002)

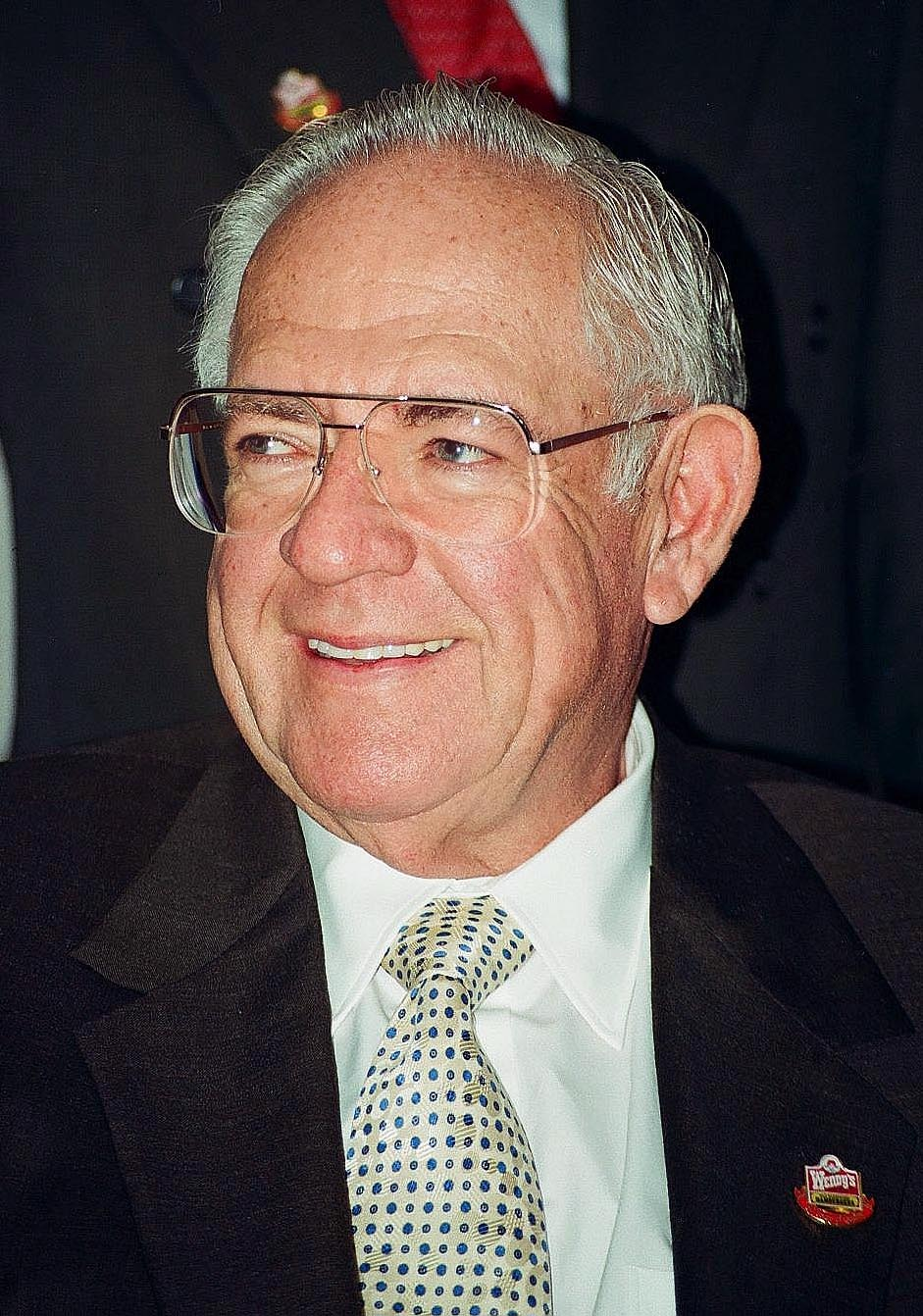
- Thomas in 1998
- Born: Rex David Thomas; July 2, 1932; Atlantic City, New Jersey, U.S
- Died: January 8, 2002 (aged 69); Fort Lauderdale, Florida, U.S
- Burial place: Union Cemetery; Columbus, Ohio, U.S
- Occupations: Businessman; philanthropist
- Years active: 1953–2002
- Known for: Founder of Wendy's
- Spouse: Lorraine
- Children: 5, including Wendy

Rex David Thomas (July 2, 1932 – January 8, 2002) was an American businessman, philanthropist, and fast-food tycoon who was the founder and chief executive officer of Wendy's, a fast-food restaurant chain specializing in hamburgers. In this role, Thomas appeared in more than 800 commercial advertisements for the chain from 1989 to 2002, more than any other company founder in television history.

== Early life ==
Rex David Thomas was born July 2, 1932, in Atlantic City, New Jersey. His biological father's name was Sam and his biological mother's name was Molly. Thomas was adopted between six weeks and six months later by Rex and Auleva Thomas, and as an adult became a well-known advocate for adoption, founding the Dave Thomas Foundation for Adoption. After his adoptive mother's death when he was five, his father moved around the country seeking work. Thomas spent some of his early childhood near Kalamazoo, Michigan, with his grandmother, Minnie Sinclair, whom he credited with teaching him the importance of service and treating others well and with respect, lessons that helped him in his future business life.

At age 12, Thomas had his first job at Regas Restaurant, a fine dining restaurant in downtown Knoxville, Tennessee, then lost it in a dispute with his boss. He vowed to never lose another job. Decades later, Regas Restaurant installed a large autographed poster of Thomas just inside their entrance, which remained until the business closed in 2010. By 15, he was moving with his father and working at the Hobby House Restaurant in Fort Wayne, Indiana, owned by Phil Clauss, who became his mentor. When his father prepared to move again, Thomas decided to stay in Fort Wayne, dropping out of high school to work full-time at the restaurant. Thomas, who considered ending his schooling the greatest mistake of his life, did not graduate from high school until 1993, when he obtained a GED.

He subsequently became an education advocate and founded the Dave Thomas Education Center in Coconut Creek, Florida, which offers GED classes to young adults.

== Career ==
=== U.S. Army ===
At the outbreak of the Korean War in 1950, rather than waiting for the draft, he volunteered for the U.S. Army at age 18 to have some choice in assignments. Having food production and service experience, Thomas requested the Cook's and Baker's School at Fort Lee, Virginia. He was sent to West Germany as a mess sergeant and was responsible for the daily meals of 2,000 soldiers, rising to the rank of staff sergeant. After his discharge in 1953, Thomas returned to Fort Wayne and the Hobby House.

=== Fast food career ===
==== Kentucky Fried Chicken ====
In the mid-1950s, Kentucky Fried Chicken founder Col. Harland Sanders came to Fort Wayne, hoping to find restaurateurs with established businesses to whom he could try to sell KFC franchises. At first, Thomas – who was the head cook at a restaurant – and the Clauss family declined Sanders' offer, but Sanders persisted, and the Clauss family franchised their restaurant with KFC; they also later owned many other KFC franchises in the Midwest. During this time, Thomas worked with Sanders on many projects to make KFC more profitable and give it brand recognition. Among other ideas for improvements, Thomas suggested that KFC reduce the number of items on its menu and instead focus on a signature dish; he also proposed that KFC make commercials in which Sanders would personally appear. Thomas was sent by the Clauss family in the mid-1960s to help turn around four of their failing KFC stores in Columbus, Ohio.

By 1968, Thomas had increased sales in the four fried chicken restaurants so much that he sold his share in them back to Sanders for more than $1.5 million. This experience would prove invaluable to Thomas when he began Wendy's about a year later.

==== Arthur Treacher's ====
After serving as a regional director for Kentucky Fried Chicken, Thomas became part of the investor group which founded Arthur Treacher's. His involvement with the new restaurant lasted less than a year before he went on to found Wendy's.

==== Wendy's ====
Thomas opened his first Wendy's in Columbus, Ohio, November 15, 1969. This original restaurant remained operational until March 2, 2007, when it was closed due to lagging sales. Thomas named the restaurant after his eight-year-old daughter Melinda Lou, whose nickname was "Wendy", stemming from the child's inability to say her own name at a young age. According to Bio TV, Dave claims that people nicknamed his daughter "Wenda. Not Wendy, but Wenda. 'I'm going to call it Wendy's Old Fashioned Hamburgers'." Before his death in 2002, Thomas admitted regret for naming the franchise after his daughter, saying "I should've just named it after myself, because it put a lot of pressure on [her]."

In 1982, Thomas resigned from his day-to-day operations at Wendy's. However, by 1985, several company business decisions, including an awkward new breakfast menu and loss in brand awareness due to fizzled marketing efforts, led the company's new president to urge Thomas back into a more active role with Wendy's. Thomas began to visit franchises and espouse his hardworking, so-called "mop-bucket attitude". In 1989, he took on a significant role as the TV spokesperson in a series of commercials for the brand. Thomas was not a natural actor, and initially, his performances were criticized as stiff and ineffective by advertising critics.

By 1990, after efforts by Wendy's advertising agency, Backer Spielvolgel Bates, to get humor into the campaign, a decision was made to portray Thomas in a more self-deprecating and folksy manner, which proved much more popular with test audiences. Consumer brand awareness of Wendy's eventually regained levels it had not achieved since octogenarian Clara Peller's highly popular "Where's the beef?" campaign of 1984.

With his natural self-effacing style and his relaxed manner, Thomas quickly became a household name. A company survey during the 1990s, a decade during which Thomas starred in every Wendy's commercial that aired, found that 90% of Americans knew who Thomas was. After more than 800 commercials, it was clear that Thomas played a major role in Wendy's' status as the third most popular burger restaurant in the U.S.

==== Authorship ====
In 1999 Thomas wrote "Franchising for Dummies" with co-author Michael Seid, to offer practical advice and insights from his experiences as a franchise owner and industry leader. The book explains the fundamentals of franchising, navigating its legal and operational complexities, and making informed decisions about franchise opportunities.

==== The Wellington School ====
In 1982, Thomas and a consortium of entrepreneurs created and launched The Wellington School in Upper Arlington, Ohio. The group of entrepreneurs spent three years refining plans, raising money, finding a property, and recruiting teachers and students.

The school opened with 137 students and 19 employees as the first co-ed independent school in the greater Columbus metropolitan area. The first graduating class was in 1989 with 32 students. In 2010, a new 76,000 sq ft (7,100 m^{2}) building opened. In 2012, the Little Jags preschool program for 3-year-olds began.

== Personal life ==
Thomas was a Christian. He was married for 47 years to Lorraine Thomas and started his family with her in Upper Arlington, Ohio. In addition to Melinda, they had three more daughters – Pam, Lori, and Molly – and a son, Kenny. After Kenny died in 2013, his sisters still continued to own and run multiple Wendy's locations. Thomas founded the chain Sisters Chicken and Biscuits in 1978, named in reference to his other three daughters.

=== Death ===
He had been afflicted with a carcinoid neuroendocrine tumor for a decade, before it metastasized to his liver. Thomas died at his home in Fort Lauderdale, Florida on January 8, 2002, at the age of 69. He was buried in Union Cemetery in Columbus, Ohio. At the time of his death, there were more than 6,000 Wendy's restaurants operating in North America.

== Honors and memberships ==
In 1979, Thomas received the Horatio Alger Award for his success with his restaurant chain Wendy's, which had reached annual sales of US$1 billion with franchises then.

In 1980, Thomas received the Golden Plate Award of the American Academy of Achievement.

Thomas, realizing that his success as a high school dropout might convince other teenagers to quit school (something he later claimed was a mistake), became a student at Coconut Creek High School. He earned a GED in 1993. Thomas was inducted into the Junior Achievement U.S. Business Hall of Fame in 1999.

Thomas was an honorary Kentucky colonel, as was former boss Harland Sanders.

Thomas was posthumously awarded the Presidential Medal of Freedom in 2003.

Thomas was raised a Master Mason in Sol. D. Bayless Lodge No. 359 of Fort Wayne, Indiana, and became a 32° Mason, N.M.J., on November 16, 1961, in the Scottish Rite Bodies of Fort Wayne. He was unanimously elected to the Scottish Rite's highest honor, the Grand Cross, by The Supreme Council, 33°, in Executive Session on October 3, 1997, in Washington, D.C.

A small triangular block and the surrounding streets and traffic pattern in the Northeast quadrant of Washington, D.C., was unofficially known in the D.C. area as Dave Thomas Circle, due to the longtime presence of a Wendy's franchise and its parking lot on that block.
