= Upper Arlington City School District =

School district in Ohio, United States

Address
- 1619 Zollinger Road Upper Arlington, Ohio, 43221; United States

District information
- Type: Public
- Grades: PK–12
- Schools: 10
- NCES District ID: 3904493

Students and staff
- Students: 6,669 (2025–2026)
- Teachers: 363.90 (on an FTE basis) (2025–2026)
- Staff: 994.71 (on an FTE basis) (2025–2026)
- Student–teacher ratio: 18.33 (2025–2026)

Other information
- Website: www.uaschools.org

Upper Arlington City School District is a public school district in the U.S. state of Ohio. It serves the entire city of Upper Arlington, Ohio in Franklin County.

== High school ==
- Upper Arlington High School

== Middle schools ==
There are two middle schools in Upper Arlington:

- Hastings Middle School
- Jones Middle School

== Elementary schools ==
- Barrington Elementary School
- Greensview Elementary School
- Tremont Elementary School
- Wickliffe Progressive Elementary School
- Windermere Elementary School

== Other schools ==
- Burbank Early Childhood School
