= Upper Arlington, Ohio =

- City
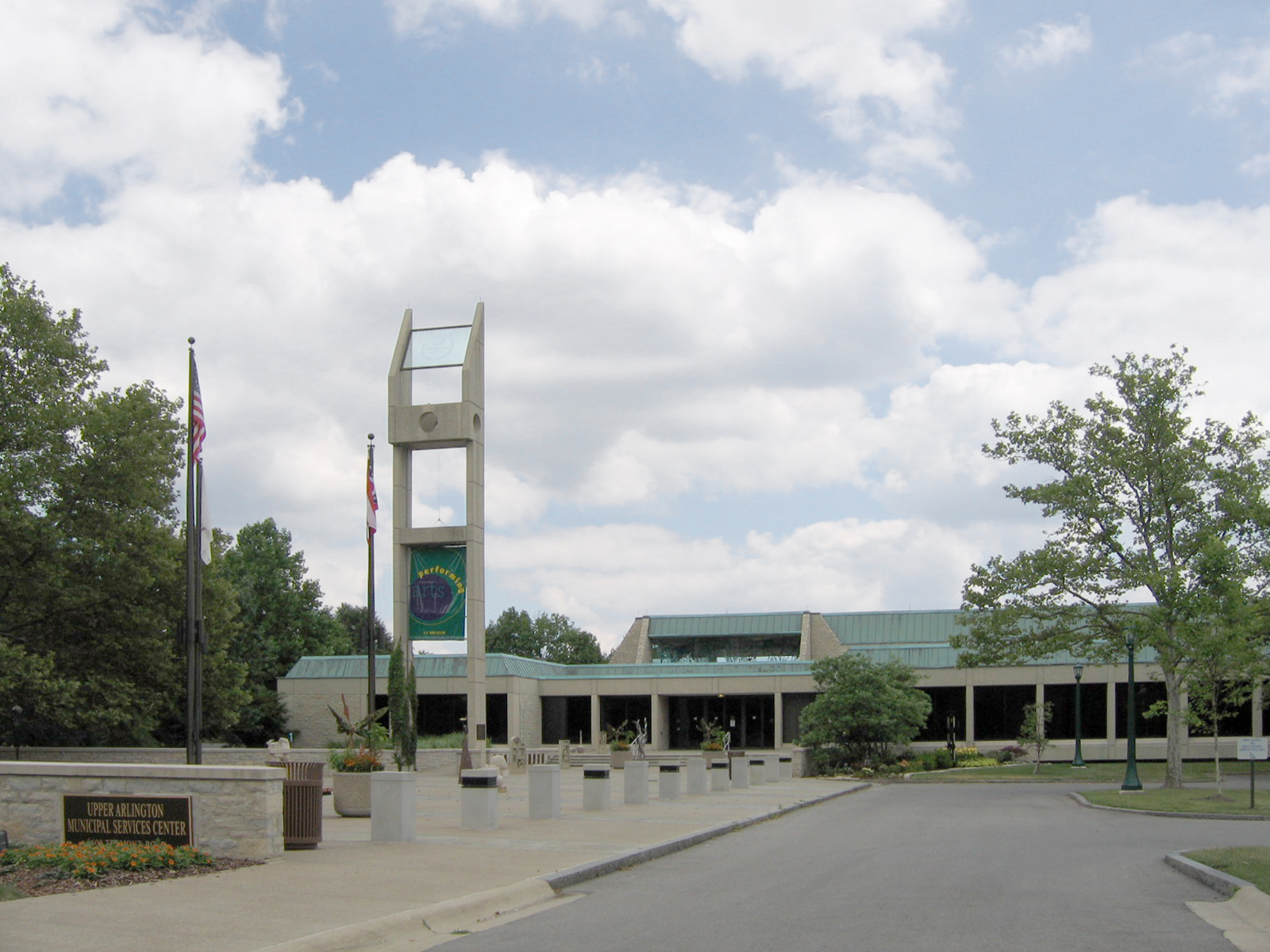
- The Upper Arlington Municipal Services Center

- Flag Logo
- Motto: "Contendite Ductum" (Latin) "Strive for Leadership"
- Interactive map of Upper Arlington, Ohio
- Location within Ohio Location within the United States
- Coordinates: 40°1′14″N 83°3′59″W
- Country: United States
- State: Ohio
- County: Franklin

Area
  - Total: 9.83 sq mi (25.45 km^{2})
  - Land: 9.80 sq mi (25.37 km^{2})
  - Water: 0.031 sq mi (0.08 km^{2})
- Elevation: 814 ft (248 m)

Population (2020)
  - Total: 36,800
  - Density: 3,756.9/sq mi (1,450.53/km^{2})
- Time zone: UTC-5 (Eastern (EST))
  - Summer (DST): UTC-4 (EDT)
- Postal code: 43212 43220 43221
- Area codes: 614 and 380
- FIPS code: 39-79002
- GNIS feature ID: 1075125
- Website: https://upperarlingtonoh.gov/

Upper Arlington (often known by its initials U.A.) is a city in Franklin County, Ohio, United States, on the northwest side of the Columbus metropolitan area. As of the 2020 census, the population was 36,800. The Old Arlington neighborhood is listed on the National Register of Historic Places.

== History ==
The land on which present-day Upper Arlington sits was first known to be inhabited by the Adena people. Centuries later the Wyandot lived there, eventually being expelled after the U.S. Government gave land grants to Revolutionary War soldiers in lieu of pay. Property originally bestowed in this area to Elijah Backus, Jonathan Dayton and Andrew Marker was sold as farm property to a number of different families in the 1800s.

Brothers and real estate developers King and Ben Thompson founded Upper Arlington. They purchased the original 840 acres of land, south of present-day Lane Avenue, from James T. Miller in 1913. It was directly adjacent to the Marble Cliff Quarry Co. The development proceeded according to the Garden City–inspired plan by landscape architect William Pitkin Jr. They first referred to the area as the "Country Club District" modeled after the Country Club development in Kansas City, but by 1917 the community had become known as "Upper Arlington" in reference to its southern neighbor of Arlington (now known as Marble Cliff).

In 1916 development was interrupted when the National Guard used the area as a temporary training camp called Camp Willis so named after Ohio's governor at the time, Frank B. Willis. Thousands of servicemen were trained at Camp Willis and then dispatched against Pancho Villa on the Mexican border. The camp was dismantled by September 1916.

The Upper Arlington Company was incorporated in 1917 and by 1920 operated out of a field office built in Miller Park; that building also served as a streetcar shelter house and is presently the Miller Park branch of the Upper Arlington Library.

On March 20, 1918, Upper Arlington incorporated as a village with a population of 200. Miller served as the first mayor. The Mallway business district, constructed in the 1920s, became the first commercial district in Upper Arlington.

From 1920 to 1945, the city enforced racially restrictive covenants in property deeds. Other restrictions Upper Arlington included green spaces, maintenance of parks, generous setbacks ensuring large front and corner lawns, and carefully controlled development of separate areas for businesses and multi-family housing.

Upper Arlington became a city on February 8, 1941, and annexed surrounding land as its population grew. In the 1940s, Upper Arlington withdrew from Perry Township by forming a paper township called Upper Arlington Township. Most annexation occurred in the late 1940s through 1960. The two largest annexations occurred in 1954 and 1955, by which the city nearly doubled its surface area. Henderson Road has been Upper Arlington's northern border since 1969.

The annexed property was part of Perry Township, which had been home to numerous farm residents and their families in the 1800s. One such resident was Pleasant Litchford, a former slave who migrated north after buying his freedom, and who became a notable citizen in the African-American community. The current high school sits on property owned by Pleasant Litchford until his death in 1879. The property was annexed into Upper Arlington in the 1950s.

Other Perry Township farming family names from the 1800s include Kennedy, Kenny, Legg, and Trapp. The McCoy, Richards, Lakin, Matthews, Delashmutt, Phenegar, Slyh, Zollinger, Bickett, Wills and Walcutt families were connected in some way by marriage and have descendants living in Upper Arlington. Richards and McCoy family reunions were held for decades; their first was in 1895, with 109 in attendance.

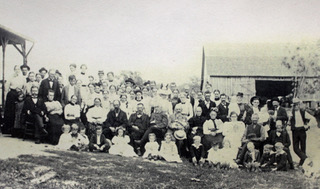
Richards & McCoy reunion

The post–World War II housing boom led to the development of many new housing tracts north of Lane Avenue. The newer developments took on a much different character from the older core of the city, being mostly organized along normal street grids and with classic ranch-style houses like those found in the area called River Ridge. By the 1960s, as the city grew north, the houses were larger and the neighborhoods more consistent with the intent, if not style, of the original section south of Lane Avenue. The southern half of the city, designated as the "Upper Arlington Historic District" (or colloquially "Old Arlington" or "South of Lane"), was listed on the National Register of Historic Places in 1985.

== Geography ==
Upper Arlington is bordered on the west by the Scioto River, on the north and east by Columbus, and on the south by Marble Cliff and Grandview Heights. The Olentangy River and the main campus of the Ohio State University are a short distance to the east of Upper Arlington.

The city is around 800 ft elevation located between the Olentangy and Scioto rivers. Two ravines cut through the city. The Slate Run in the northwest corner flows into the Scioto River. Turkey Run originates in the north then runs southwards until it makes an eastward bend around Reed Rd. Then, it flows eastwards through the OSU Golf Course. The run is used as a storm drain at points, has been dammed in the Ohio State course and runs through concrete pipes at two points. The soil is glacial till and is suitable for agriculture, supporting a research farm operated by Ohio State University.

According to the United States Census Bureau, the city has a total area of 9.87 square miles (25.56 km^{2}), of which 9.84 square miles (25.49 km^{2}) is land and 0.03 square miles (0.08 km^{2}) is water.

== Demographics ==
Historical population
Census	Pop.	Note	%±
1920	620		—
1930	3,059		393.4%
1940	5,370		75.5%
1950	9,024		68.0%
1960	28,486		215.7%
1970	38,727		36.0%
1980	35,648		−8.0%
1990	34,128		−4.3%
2000	33,686		−1.3%
2010	33,771		0.3%
2020	36,800		9.0%

=== 2020 census ===
As of the 2020 census, Upper Arlington had a population of 36,800, a median age of 40.4 years, and 26.0% of residents under the age of 18 while 18.1% of residents were 65 years of age or older; for every 100 females there were 94.2 males and for every 100 females age 18 and over there were 89.8 males age 18 and over.

As of the 2020 census, 100.0% of residents lived in urban areas while 0.0% lived in rural areas.

As of the 2020 census, there were 14,106 households in Upper Arlington, of which 36.8% had children under the age of 18 living in them; 61.2% were married-couple households, 12.0% were households with a male householder and no spouse or partner present, and 22.8% were households with a female householder and no spouse or partner present, and 23.9% of all households were made up of individuals with 11.8% having someone living alone who was 65 years of age or older.

As of the 2020 census, there were 14,831 housing units, of which 4.9% were vacant; the homeowner vacancy rate was 1.2% and the rental vacancy rate was 7.7%.

Racial composition as of the 2020 census
Race	Number	Percent
White	31,686	86.1%
Black or African American	374	1.0%
American Indian and Alaska Native	32	0.1%
Asian	2,412	6.6%
Native Hawaiian and Other Pacific Islander	12	0.0%
Some other race	225	0.6%
Two or more races	2,059	5.6%
Hispanic or Latino (of any race)	886	2.4%

=== 2010 census ===
As of the 2010 census, the population was 33,771 persons, 16,157 male (47.84%) and 17,614 female (52.16%). The following table summarizes census findings for age with the median being 42.8 years.

Age group	Number of persons	Percentage
16+	26,343	78.00%
18+	25,304	74.93%
21+	24,511	72.60%
62+	6,916	20.50%
65+	5,636	16.69%

Race	Number of persons	Percentage
White	31,635	93.7%
Black or African American	418	1.2%
Native American or Alaskan Native	152	.5%
Asian	1,957	5.8%
Native Hawaiian or Pacific Islander	16	0%
Some Other Race	182	.5%

Housing category	Number of homes	Misc
Total Housing Units	14,544	-
Occupied Homes	13,754	2.46 residents per occupied home
Owner Occupied Homes	11,117	80.83% of homes (83.27% of residents) are owner occupied
Rented Homes	2,637	19.17% of homes (16.73% of residents) are rented
Family Households (with own children) under 18 years	4,486	33.40%
Vacant Homes	790	5.43% of homes were vacant, including 260 for sale, 201 for rent, and 44 occasional use

=== 2000 census ===
As of the census of 2000, there were 33,686 people, 13,985 households, and 9,509 families households in the city. The population density was 3,450.2 inhabitants per square mile (1,332.1/km^{2}). There were 14,432 housing units at an average density of 1,478.2 per square mile (570.7/km^{2}). The racial makeup of the city was 94.7% White, 3.5% Asian, 1% Hispanic or Latino, 0.6% African American, 0.10% Native American, 0.0% Pacific Islander, 0.3% from other races, and 0.8% from two or more races.

There were 13,985 households, out of which 31.9% had children under the age of 18 living with them, 59.1% were married couples living together, 6.9% had a female householder with no husband present, and 32.0% were non-families. 28.2% of householders were living alone, 12.9% had someone living alone who was 65 years of age or older. The average household size was 2.39 and the average family size was 2.95.

In the city the population was spread out, with 75% over the age of 18 years, 2.6% 20 to 24 years, 15.5% 25–44 years, 16.9% were 45–54 years, and 21.1% were 62 years and older. The median age was 43 years.

== Arts and culture ==
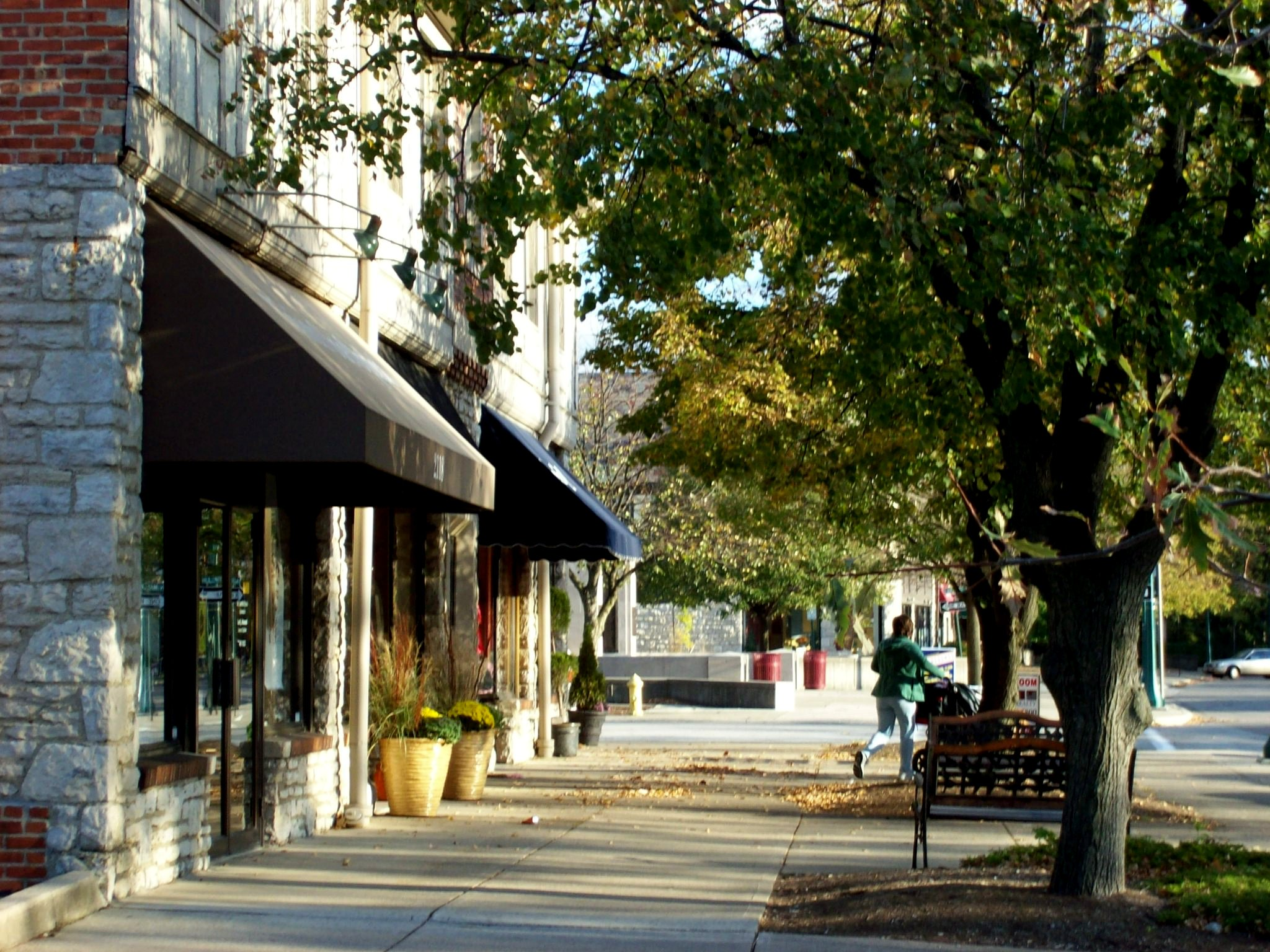
Downtown Upper Arlington

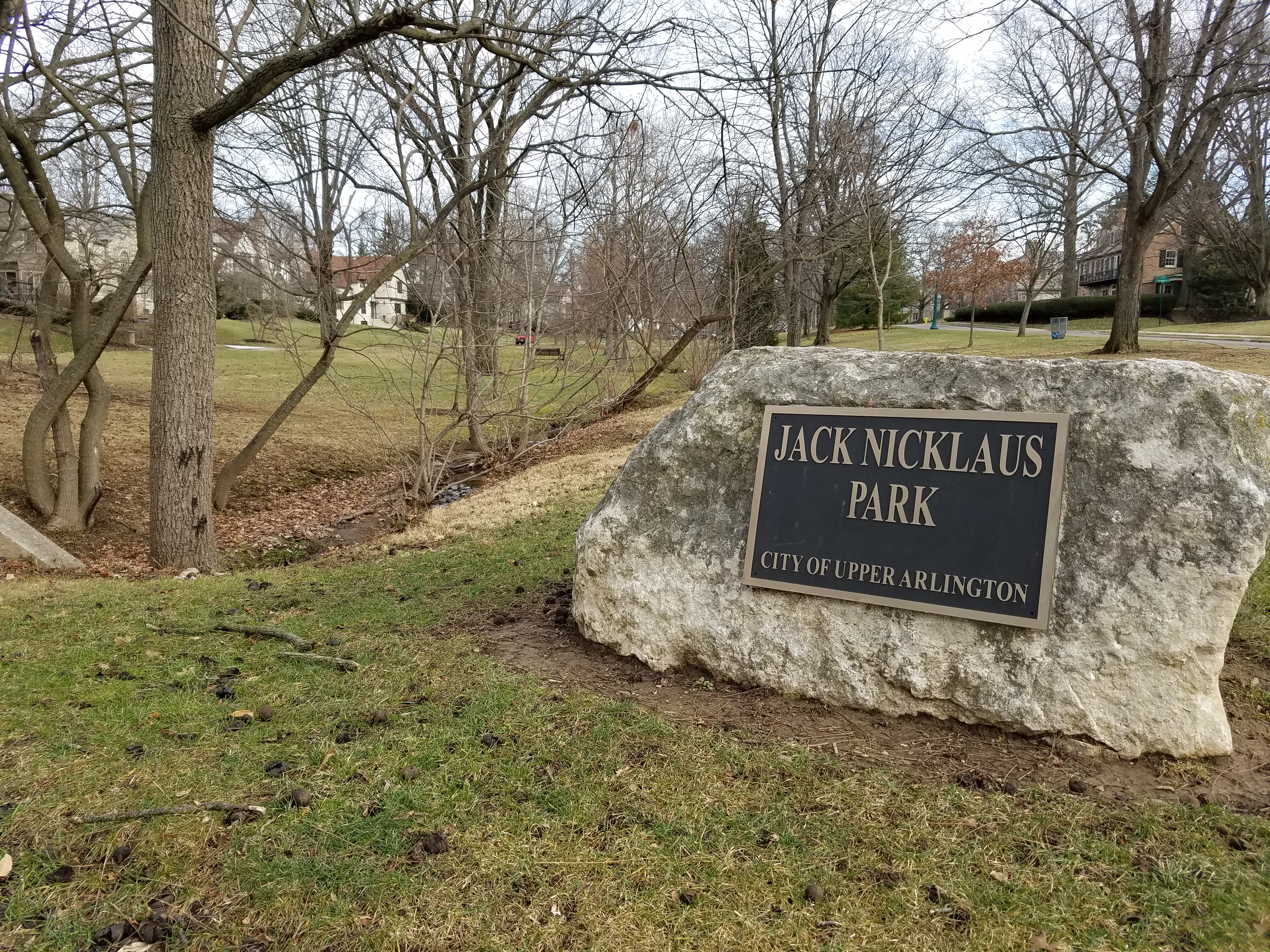
Jack Nicklaus Park, named for Upper Arlington resident Jack Nicklaus

Upper Arlington has a public gallery at the Municipal Services Center, temporary and permanent public art projects, educational programming in the schools, summer outdoor concerts, and the Labor Day Arts Festival. Established in 1966, the Arts Festival attracts more than 25,000 visitors to Northam Park to purchase fine arts and crafts from approximately 200 artist vendors, enjoy art activities, interactive performances, live music and more.

The Parks & Recreation Department—in consultation with the Cultural Arts Commission—hosts family oriented community events throughout the year, including Winter Fest, holiday tree lighting, Fall Fest, Spring Fling and Summer Celebration. The city hosts a free, outdoor summer concert series in June and July, bringing a mix of local and regional musicians to the outdoor stage of the Amelita Mirolo Barn in Sunny 95 Park.

The Upper Arlington Civic Association (UACA), with assistance from the city, hosts the community's annual Fourth of July celebrations. These include a parade along Northwest Boulevard in the morning, and an evening festival – Party in the Park – which features live music and ends with a fireworks display. UACA also hosts an annual Easter Candy Hunt at Thompson Park, the Halloween event "Golden Bear Scare" at Smith Nature Park, visits with Santa at Christmas in the Park, a holiday home decorating contest and more.

=== Upper Arlington Public Library ===
The Upper Arlington Public Library (UAPL) system comprises the Main Library, a 60,000 square foot facility located on Tremont Road near the geographic center of the city, the 10,000 square foot Lane Road Branch, approximately three miles to the north, and the 4,400 square foot Miller Park Branch, one and one half miles south near the center of Old Arlington. Before 1967, the libraries in Upper Arlington were branches of the Grandview Heights Public Library. After circulation at the Upper Arlington branches surpassed their parent library, Mayor John Dunkel spearheaded an effort to challenge a law prohibiting new library systems in Ohio. The Ohio General Assembly passed Ohio House Bill No. 494 in 1967, allowing Upper Arlington to independently establish and govern its own library system.

== Government ==
The City of Upper Arlington operates under the Council/Manager form of government—a system of representative democracy that combines the policy-setting leadership of elected officials with managerial experience of an appointed manager. The City Council is elected by citizens and then hires a professional City Manager to run day-to-day operations and implement policy passed by Council.

Upper Arlington's Community Development Department coordinates the many aspects involved in the city's growth, development and preservation Building, Planning and Property Maintenance divisions. An Economic Development Division provides services to help businesses and amenities available to residents. The Engineering Division manages the city's public infrastructure—such as roads, waterlines, sanitary and storm sewer systems, and public right-of-way. The Public Works Division focuses on minor road repairs, street cleaning, snow removal and leaf collection.

Upper Arlington's Fire Division staffs all medic trucks with at least two paramedics and all fire apparatus with at least one paramedic. The Police Division provides 24-hour service.

The Parks & Recreation Department maintains the city's parks, street trees and other public spaces. They offer programs and activities for youth, adult and senior adults varying from cultural arts, aquatics and tennis, culinary and crafts.

Upper Arlington oversees and maintains 21 parks covering approximately 186 acres. Park facilities include playgrounds, sports fields, shelters and picnic areas, walking paths, fitness trails and wooded areas. In addition, the City owns and operates three outdoor community swimming pools – Tremont Pool, Devon Pool, and the Reed Road Water Park – which are open Memorial Day weekend through Labor Day weekend.

== Education ==
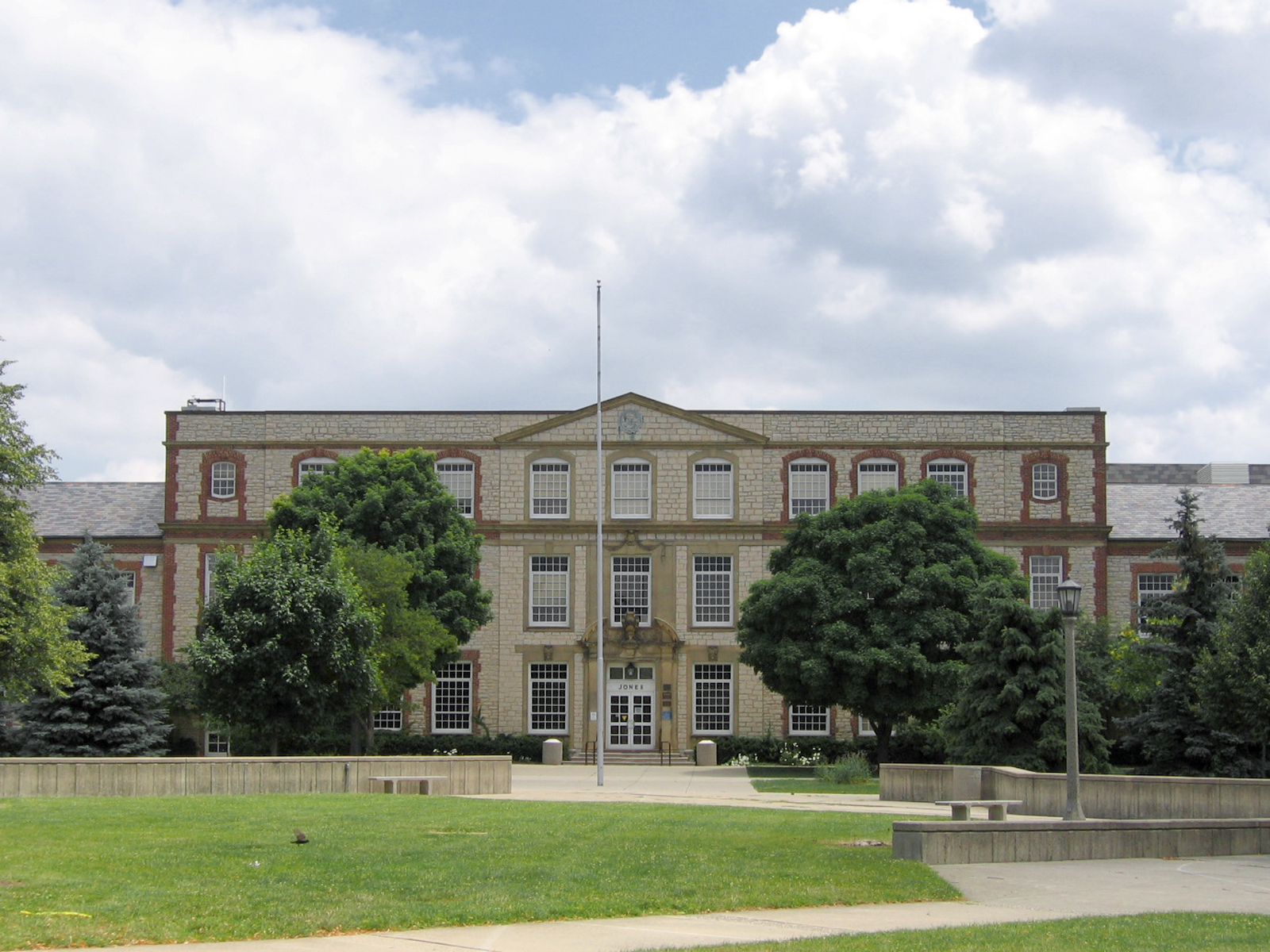
Jones Middle School, located on the former site of Camp Willis. The building, which terminates the mallway at the center of the Historic District, was designed by Ohio Stadium architect Howard Dwight Smith and served as the first permanent school in Upper Arlington upon its completion in 1924.

The Upper Arlington City School District serves the entire municipality. As of 2000, the Upper Arlington Board of Education was the city's largest employer. The district provides an early education school, five elementary schools, two middle schools, and a high school. Burbank Early Education School serves students before the elementary level and was created during a period when the population demanded fewer elementary buildings. The district offers an optional informal/progressive style of education through Wickliffe Progressive Elementary and Barrington Elementary, the latter of which also provides a contemporary program. Other elementary schools include Greensview, Tremont and Windermere.

Hastings Middle School was built in the 1960s and serves the northern area of the district. Jones Middle School is located in the former high school building that was also the site of the Willis National Guard Camp and serves the southern portion. Upper Arlington High School serves students from the entire district and maintains membership in the International Baccalaureate program. It was rebuilt in 2021. The Upper Arlington High School mascot is the Golden Bear, which became the nickname of professional golfer Jack Nicklaus, an alumnus of the school.

Private K-12 schools include; The Wellington School and two Catholic grade schools—St. Agatha and St. Andrew. Both St. Agatha and St. Andrew offer K-8 programs and preschool childcare centers.

== Notable people ==
- John W. Bricker, U.S. Senator and the 54th Governor of Ohio
- Jake Borelli, actor
- Cordelia E Cook, first woman to receive both the Bronze Star Medal and the Purple Heart
- John Cooper, football player and coach for the Ohio State University from 1988 to 2000
- Beverly D'Angelo, actress and singer
- Nick Foligno, ice hockey player for the Chicago Blackhawks and the Columbus Blue Jackets
- Simon Fraser, college and professional football player
- Woody Hayes, head football coach of the Ohio State Buckeyes
- Jon Husted, U.S. Senator and the 66th Lieutenant Governor of Ohio, 50th Secretary of State of Ohio, former state Senator, and former Speaker of the Ohio House of Representatives
- Arthur G. James, surgeon who specialized in treating cancer patients, namesake of the Arthur G. James Cancer Hospital
- Abigail Johnston, USA Olympic silver-medalist synchronized diver
- Jack Nicklaus, professional golfer
- William O'Neill, 59th Governor of Ohio
- Vivek Ramaswamy, businessman and 2024 Republican presidential candidate
- James A. Rhodes, U.S. state governor, served four, four-year terms in office
- Harley Rouda, U.S. House Representative from California (2019–2021)
- Randy Skinner, Broadway Director and Choreographer
- George Smoot, Nobel Prize winning astrophysicist, cosmologist
- Chris Spielman, professional football player, television sports commentator for ESPN and ABC Sports
- Steve Stivers, U.S. House Representative for Ohio's 15th congressional district
- Melinda Lou "Wendy" Thomas, businesswoman and namesake for Wendy's
- Rex Dave Thomas, businessman and founder of Wendy's
- Jim Tressel, 67th Lieutenant Governor of Ohio, head football coach of the Ohio State Buckeyes, President of Youngstown State University

== Sister city ==
The city has one sister city relationship:

- St. Andrews, Scotland, United Kingdom
