= Wendy Thomas =

American restaurant owner

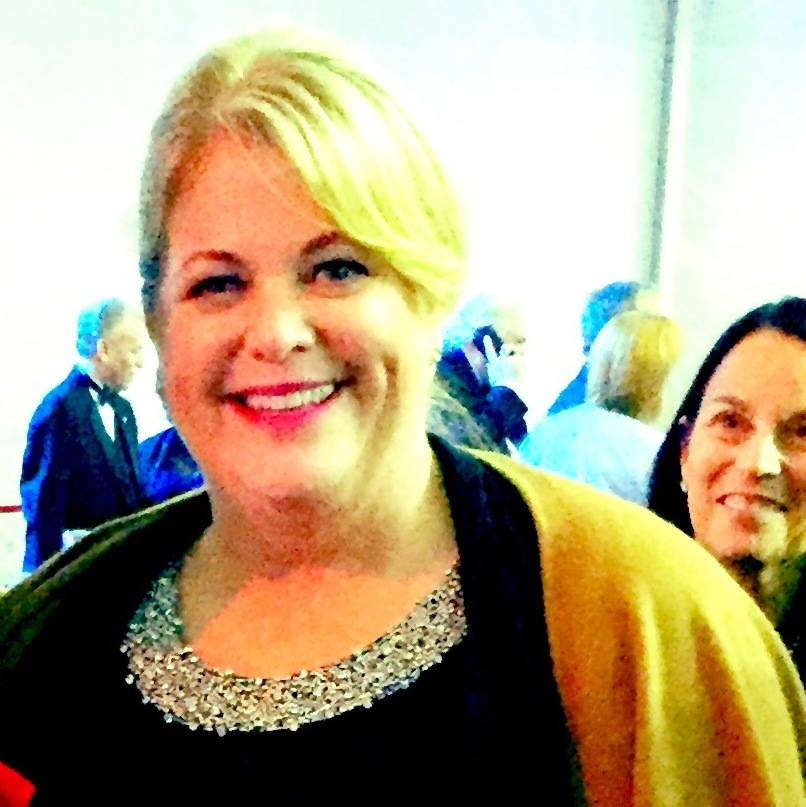
- Thomas in 2016
- Born: Melinda Lou Thomas; September 14, 1961 (age 65); Columbus, Ohio, U.S.
- Education: University of Florida
- Employer: The Wendy's Company
- Known for: Namesake of Wendy's hamburger chain
- Spouse: Paul Morse
- Parent(s): Dave Thomas; Lorraine Thomas

Melinda Lou "Wendy" Thomas-Morse (born September 14, 1961) is the daughter of American businessman Dave Thomas, the founder of the fast food brand Wendy's. She is the namesake and mascot of the brand. She uses the name Wendy Thomas in her role as a spokesperson for Wendy's.

== Early life and education ==
Thomas was born in Columbus, Ohio, grew up in Upper Arlington, and is the fourth child of Dave and Lorraine Thomas.

Her siblings couldn’t pronounce her name, so they started calling her Wenda, which then turned into Wendy. The eight-year-old would eventually become the namesake of her father's restaurant Wendy's Old Fashioned Hamburgers, or just "Wendy's" for short. In addition to being the namesake, her likeness was used as the Wendy's logo in the form of a young freckle-faced girl in red braids. Thomas graduated from the University of Florida in 1983 with a bachelor's degree in consumer behaviorism.

== Career ==
Thomas owned several Wendy's restaurants near Dallas, Texas until 1999. After the death of her father Dave Thomas in 2002, she and her siblings bought restaurants in her native Columbus area. As of September 2010, Thomas herself owned or co-owned more than 30 Wendy's stores. In November 2010, she began appearing in Wendy’s ads on camera for the first time. (Her voice was featured in a 1989 ad giving her father advice from off-camera.) The 2010 ads aired first in Las Vegas, Nevada; Mobile, Alabama; and Virginia Beach, Virginia; test markets before being rolled out nationally.

Beginning in April 2012 she starred in a series of ads for Wendy's called That Wendy's Way. She also appeared in the 'Dave's Hot 'N Juicy Cheeseburger' commercial produced by Publicis Groupe's Kaplan Thaler Group..
