= Jones Middle School =

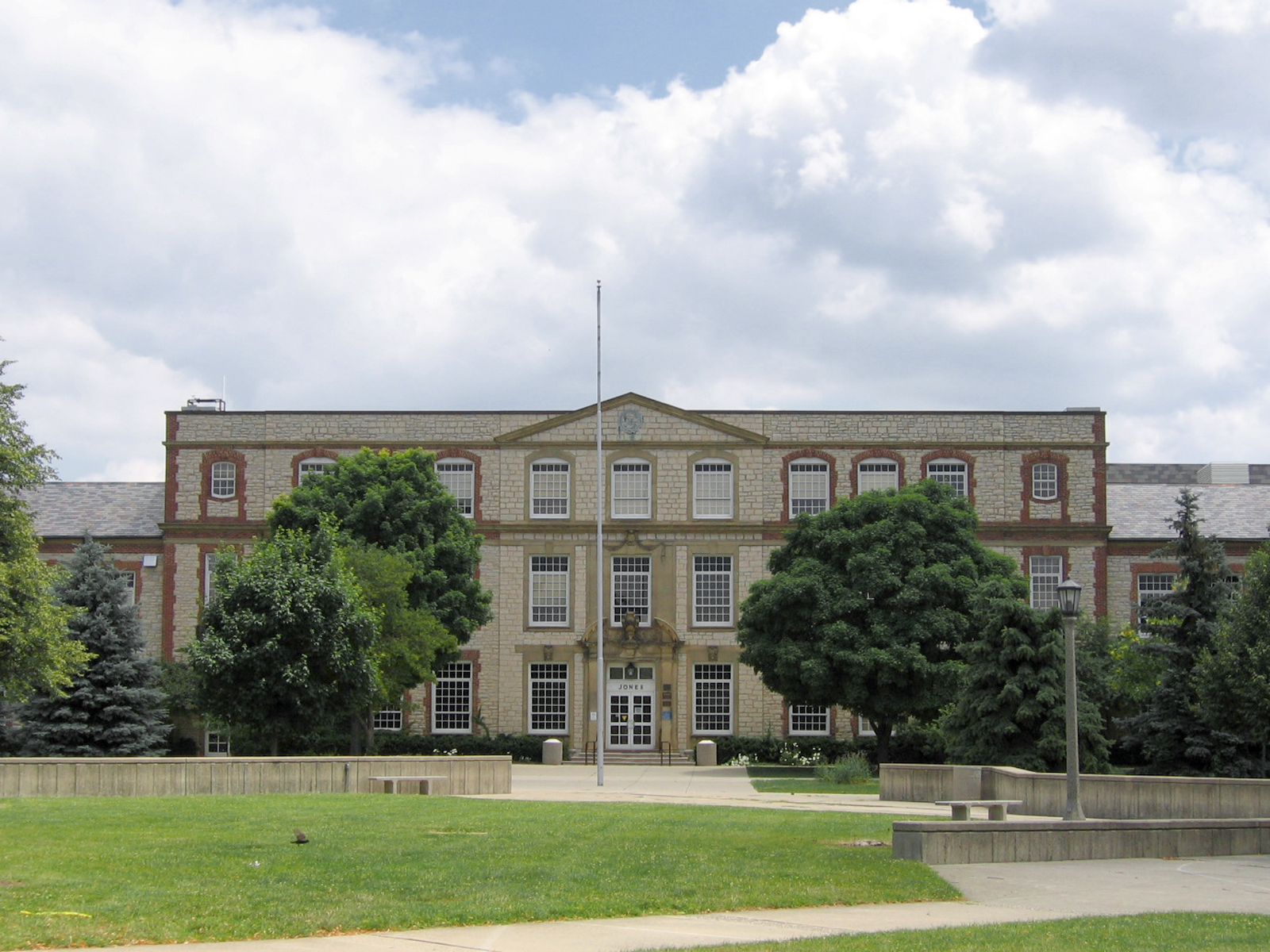

Location
- Upper Arlington, Ohio; United States of America; 39°59′58″N 83°03′37″W

Information
- School type: Public
- Established: 1924
- School district: Upper Arlington City School District
- Principal: Jasa George
- Grades: 6-8
- Gender: Male, Female
- Language: English
- Website: www.uaschools.org/jonesmiddleschool_home.aspx

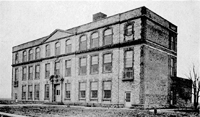
The building upon completion.

Jones Middle School is one of two middle schools in the Upper Arlington City School District, in Upper Arlington, Ohio. The school is located in the center of the Upper Arlington Historic District, at the end of the Mallway.

== Building and history ==
The site that is now Jones Middle School previously served as Camp Willis, a military training camp during World War I. This is noted by a plaque near the Arlington Avenue side of the site.

The neo-classical school building was designed by Ohio Stadium architect Howard Dwight Smith and completed in 1924. It served as the first permanent school in Upper Arlington, serving grades 1–6; grades 7-12 were added to the building following its 1926 expansion. The building was renamed Upper Arlington High School in 1939 with the opening of another Smith-designed school, Barrington Road Elementary School.

Jones Middle School became an International Baccalaureate World School in November 2012.

== Notable alumni ==
- Jack Nicklaus (b. 1940), professional golfer widely regarded as the best of all time, winning a total of 18 career major championships
- Abby Johnston (b. 1989), olympic athlete who won a silver medal in the Women's synchronized 3 metre springboard at the 2012 Summer Olympics

== See also ==
- Upper Arlington High School
