= Arthur G. James =

American surgeon (1912–2001)

Arthur G James (March 14, 1912 – October 22, 2001) was an American surgeon who specialized in treating cancer patients. He was instrumental in the founding of the Arthur G. James Cancer Hospital in Columbus, Ohio, which is named after him.

== Childhood ==
James was born Arthur David Giangiacomo on March 14, 1912, in Rhodesdale, Ohio, a former mining town in Belmont County.

James was the second oldest of seven children (Grace, Felix, Arthur, Elizabeth, Leona, Lilian, Clara, and Vincent "Vince", according to the 1920 Census for Wheeling Township, Belmont County). His parents were Abraham and Rosa Pezzotane Giangiacomo, Italian immigrants who arrived in the U.S. in 1904 and 1906 respectively. Abraham worked initially as a coal miner and later owned a grocery store. As a boy, James delivered groceries at the store.

== Education ==
James's first education was in a one-room schoolhouse in Belmont County, Ohio. He later attended a larger two-room school in Uniontown near Saint Clairsville, Ohio, for third to eighth grades. James went to St. Clairsville High School, where he graduated in 1930 as co-valedictorian. He attended Ohio State University (OSU), earning a bachelor's degree in 1934; and a master's degree in surgery and a medical degree, both in 1937.

James served his medical internship at the University of Chicago Hospitals and his second-year surgical internship at Duke University Hospital. He then returned to OSU Hospital and completed his three-year residency in general surgery. James served as chief resident at OSU Hospital from 1941 to 1942.

After completing his surgical residency, James was accepted as a Fellow at Memorial Hospital in New York City. His fellowship began July 1, 1942, but six weeks later he was called to military service for World War II. James served with the 65th General Hospital Army Reserve unit, which he had joined while at Duke. James served 43 months in the Army Medical Corps as a major, 22 of which were in the European Theatre at the Duke University Army General Hospital. After the war, James returned to Memorial Hospital and completed his fellowship.

James returned to Ohio State University in 1947 as an assistant professor in the Department of Surgery. He remained at OSU for the rest of his career, working his way up to full professor and chief of the Division of Surgical Oncology. James was also the first physician to hold the Lucius A. Wing Chair of Cancer Research and Therapy.

== Family ==
In 1940, James married Mildred "Millie" Cameron. They had two children, David and Cameron.

== Awards and leadership ==
During his life, James served on the board of directors for the Columbus Cancer Clinic and as its medical director. He served as the national president of the American Cancer Society from 1972 to 1973. In 1987, James was inducted into the Horatio Alger Association of Distinguished Americans.

James once said, “All cancer will eventually be wiped out; there’s no doubt about that, I don’t know how long it will take, but… I’m sure that day is coming.” That belief, plus his conviction that cancer patients needed separate, specialized care, led James to lobby, campaign, and raise funds for 35 years to build a cancer hospital in Central Ohio.

The ribbon cutting for the new cancer hospital was Tuesday, January 16, 1990. At this ceremony, to James's surprise, it was announced that the new hospital would be called the Arthur G. James Cancer Hospital and Research Institute. The cancer hospital and its research institute are now known as Arthur G. James Cancer Hospital and Richard J. Solove Research Institute, part of The Ohio State University Medical Center in Columbus.

== Death ==
At age 89, on October 22, 2001, James died of Parkinson's disease.
