= Upper Arlington High School =

Public school in Upper Arlington, Ohio, US

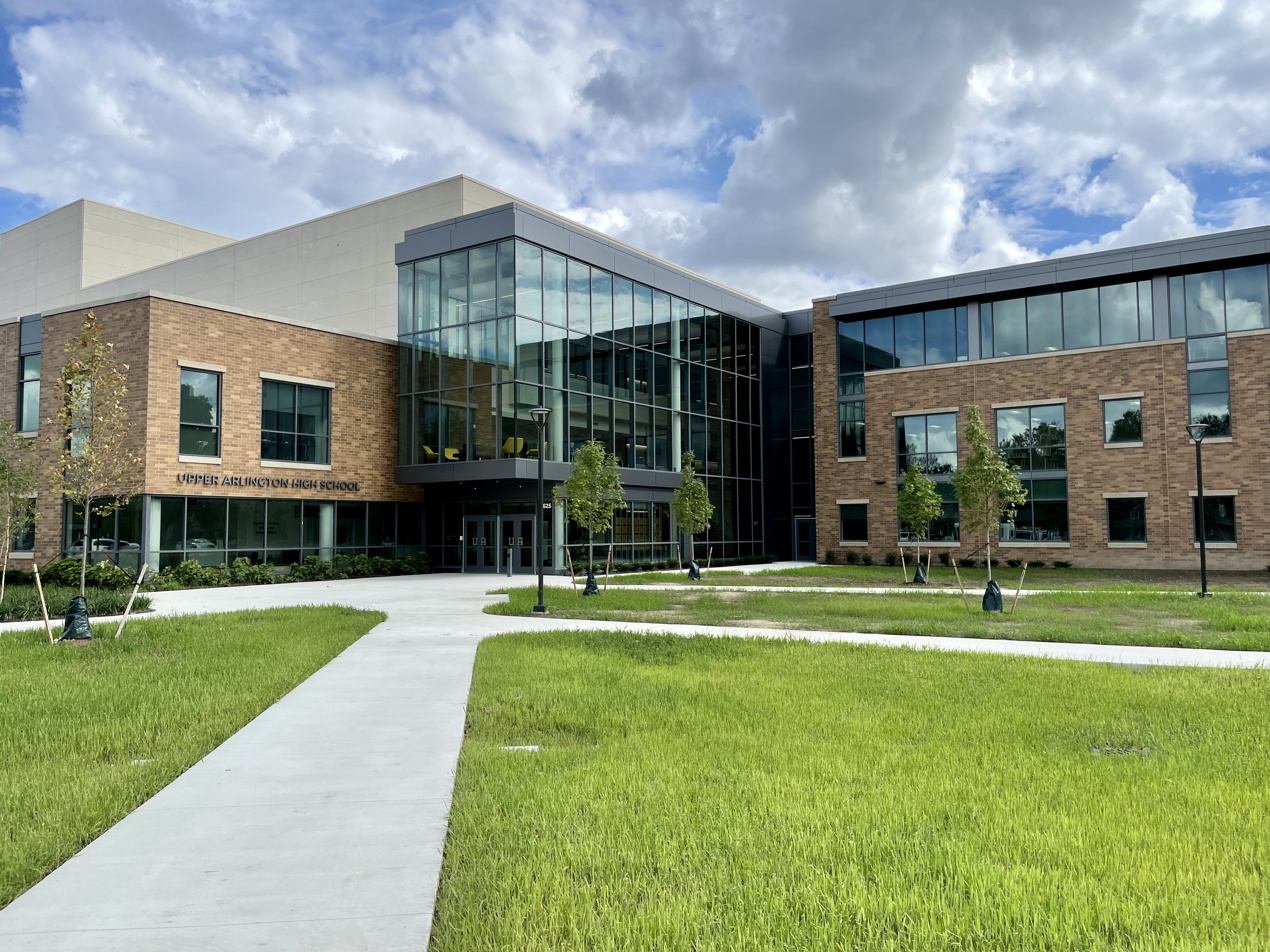

Location
- 1625 Zollinger Road; Upper Arlington, Ohio 43221; United States; 40°0′55″N 83°3′17″W

Information
- Type: Public, Coeducational high school
- Motto: Serve, Lead, and Succeed
- Opened: 1956 (former); 2021 (current)
- Founders: King Thompson; Ben Thompson
- Sister school: Madras College (exchange program)
- School district: Upper Arlington City School District
- Superintendent: Robert Hunt
- CEEB code: 361630
- NCES School ID: 3904493
- Principal: Tom Lombardi
- Teaching staff: 86.49 (FTE)
- Grades: 9-12
- Enrollment: 1,895 (2023–2024)
- Student to teacher ratio: 21.91
- Colors: Gold and Black
- Song: Dear Arlington
- Fight song: Stand Up and Cheer
- Athletics conference: Ohio Capital Conference
- Mascot: Golden Bear
- USNWR ranking: Ranked #609 nationally, #22 in Ohio
- Newspaper: Arlingtonian
- Yearbook: Norwester
- Website: uahs.uaschools.org

Upper Arlington High School is the sole high school in the Upper Arlington City School District in Upper Arlington, Ohio, a northwest suburb of Columbus, Ohio. It receives students from Jones Middle School and Hastings Middle School. The current principal of the high school is Mr. Andrew Theado. The mascot is a golden bear.

== History and former buildings ==
The date when Upper Arlington Schools began informal operation is unclear, but it is known to generally be before 1917. Instruction was first in the informal basement of King Thompson's house at 1930 Cambridge Blvd. The Thompson Brothers, King and Ben Thompson, were the original developers of the city of Upper Arlington. After attending the basement school, students would attend schools in nearby Grandview Heights.

A school board was appointed by the county superintendent of schools, and John W. Wuichet, Sr. was named president in 1918. One of Wuichet's first actions was to move the school in Thompson's basement into a formal building. After construction that same year, Upper Arlington High School was thus founded in a temporary structure in the army barracks from Camp Willis, an Ohio National Guard training camp located in modern-day Upper Arlington. This was the first building for the school.

In 1924, a permanent building, now Jones Middle School, was built. Construction was completed on March 24. At the time, the building did not house the High School, with a total of with six teachers and approximately 150 students, grades 1 to 6 only. Later, the High School moved in following the building’s expansion in 1926, marking the second building in the High School's history. In 1928, the current "Golden Bears" mascot was chosen by students.

In 1956, Ridgeview Road building, the third building, was constructed to accommodate post-war growth and the predicted surge of students due to the Baby boom. In the 60s and 70s, the school underwent major expansions, including a natatorium and auditorium, after plans for a second high school were abandoned.

A new, modern high school was completed in 2021 on the same site as the previous building, serving approximately 1,900 students, and costing $230 million to construct, $280 million adjusted for inflation as of April 2026. The old building was demolished to make room for parking and sports facilities.

== Academics ==
Upper Arlington High School offers Honors and Advanced Placement courses two to three years ahead of requirements and joined the International Baccalaureate program in 2005.

Upper Arlington High School also offers music programs, including band, orchestra, and vocal music performance classes, music theory, guitar, and IB music.

== Athletics ==
The school's mascot is the Golden Bear. Its original colors, black and orange, were replaced with black and gold in 1941 to match the mascot. Golf pro and UAHS alumnus Jack Nicklaus received his Golden Bear nickname from his alma mater. Golden Bear sports teams consistently rank among the top Division I schools in Ohio, particularly in football, golf, tennis, basketball, water polo, cross country, lacrosse, and swimming. The Upper Arlington football team captured the Division One state title in football in 2000, and was led by Jeff Backes, who earned the Mr. Football Award for Ohio, and Simon Fraser, who went on to play for the Ohio State Buckeyes and Cleveland Browns.

The school also has a rowing team that competes throughout the school year, rowing during Fall and Spring seasons. The Upper Arlington Crew team is the only scholastic rowing program in central Ohio, and it consistently races to top finishes at prestigious events such as the Midwest Scholastic, Midwest Junior, Scholastic Nationals and US Rowing Youth National Championship Regattas. The team also frequently sends boats to the Head of the Charles Regatta, a selective rowing event that attracts the best rowers from all over the world.

Upper Arlington is 3rd all-time in Ohio with 50 Ohio High School Athletic Association team state championships. Upper Arlington has won 117 state titles overall, including sports not sponsored by the OHSAA. Upper Arlington holds the record for most OHSAA state championships in one year (Boys' Golf, Girls' Cross Country, Boys' Swimming & Diving, Boys' Baseball) set in 1986–1987.

=== OHSAA State championships ===
- Baseball — 1987, 1990
- Boys' basketball — 1937
- Football — 2000
- Boys' golf — 1941, 1956, 1960, 1965, 1968, 1969, 1972, 1974, 1977, 1981, 1982, 1985, 1986, 1992, 1993, 1999, 2006
- Boys' ice hockey — 2025
- Boys' lacrosse — 2022
- Boys' swimming — 1985, 1986, 1987
- Boys' track and field — 1937, 1939
- Girls' basketball — 1988
- Girls' cross country — 1978, 1981, 1982, 1985, 1986, 1990
- Girls’ field hockey — 2024, 2026
- Girls' gymnastics — 1995
- Girls' lacrosse — 2017, 2018, 2019, 2023
- Girls' swimming — 2003, 2005, 2006, 2007, 2008, 2009, 2010, 2011, 2012, 2015, 2016, 2017, 2024, 2025, 2026
- Girls' track and field — 1985
- Girls’ soccer — 2025

=== Other team state championships ===
- Boys' lacrosse — 1994, 1995, 1997, 1998, 2000, 2001, 2004, 2005, 2006
- Boys' water polo — 1992, 1993, 1994, 2000, 2004, 2009, 2012, 2021, 2022
- Girls' water polo — 1994, 1995, 2000, 2001, 2002, 2003, 2004, 2005, 2006, 2008, 2010, 2012, 2014, 2015, 2016, 2019, 2020, 2021, 2022
- Football — 1967, 1968, 1969

1967–1969 football state championships not sponsored by OHSAA until 1972, girls water polo state championship was sponsored by the Ohio High School Swim Coaches Association, boys lacrosse state championships were sponsored by the Ohio High School Lacrosse Association

== Notable alumni ==
- Jake Borelli, actor, best known for his role as Dr. Levi Schmitt on Grey's Anatomy
- Lois McMaster Bujold — Hugo Award-winning novelist
- Beverly D'Angelo — Actress, best known for her role as Ellen Griswold in the National Lampoon's Vacation films
- Chris Frey Jr. — Former professional football player
- Rose Goettemoeller — Assistant Secretary of State for Arms Control, Verification, and Compliance and the chief negotiator of the New START Treaty
- Blake Haxton — Paralympic rower and canoeist, silver medalist
- Abby Johnston, synchronized diver, Olympic silver medalist
- Danny Logan — Professional lacrosse player
- John Knox, Major League Baseball player
- Jack Nicklaus — Professional golfer
- Harley Rouda — U.S. House Representative from California (2021-2023)
- Randy Skinner — Broadway Director and Choreographer
- George Smoot — Nobel Prize-winning astrophysicist
- Joann Steinbrenner, philanthropist, Vice Chair of the Yankees
- Terry Waldo — Ragtime artist
