= Phyllis Bolds =

American physicist

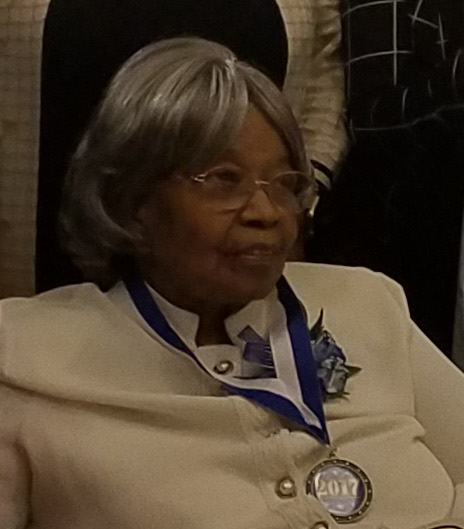
- Phyllis Bolds in 2017 upon receiving plaque at Dunbar High School
- Born: Phyllis Gaynell Allen; January 16, 1932
- Died: November 9, 2018 (aged 86)
- Education: Central State College; University of Dayton; Simmons University
- Employers: United States Air Force; Wright-Patterson Air Force Base

Phyllis Gaynell Bolds (born Phyllis Allen; January 16, 1932 — November 9, 2018) was an American physicist who worked for the United States Air Force Flight Dynamics Laboratory at Wright-Patterson Air Force Base.

== Early life and education ==
Bolds was born the ninth of ten children in the family of Anna Y. and Albert J. Allen. She received the American Association of Teachers of Spanish and Portuguese Medal Award for 1947-48. She graduated as a valedictorian from Dunbar High School, part of the Dayton Public School System, in 1950. Bolds was the inaugural recipient of the Delta Sigma Theta Debutante Scholarship. She studied physics at Central State College, earning a degree in physics magna cum laude in 1954. She was typically the only woman in her physics classes. Soon after graduating she was hired by the Wright-Patterson Air Force Base. The United States Air Force supported her to earn two masters degrees, one in computer science at the University of Dayton in 1973 and the second in management at Simmons University in 1977

== Research and career ==
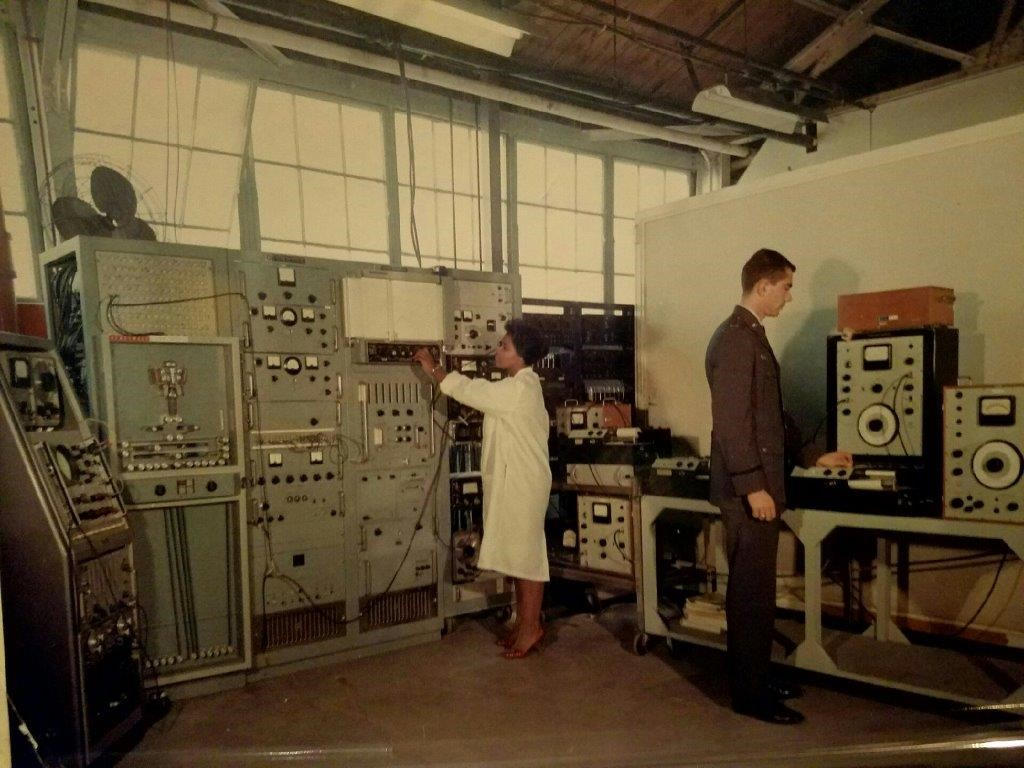
Phyllis Bolds at work in the Radar Branch, Air Research Lab, in 1955

Bolds started work in 1955 as a physicist on the Wright-Patterson Air Force Base in the Electronics Technology Laboratory, radar branch. She transferred to the Flight Dynamics Laboratory in 1957, where she investigated dynamic operating environments.

At the time, a challenge in the design and use of aircraft was the lack of information about the dynamic operating environments. Bolds provided technical administration on a 1966-68 project that investigated how to predict the vibration environments of future aircraft using data collected from past aircraft. She collected aircraft vibration data on the Northrop Grumman B-2 Spirit, McDonnell Douglas F-15 Eagle and Douglas C-133 Cargomaster, using test flights to collect information about the vibration environments that exist around vehicles during normal flight conditions. As so much data was collected, processing techniques such as spectrum analyzers and minicomputers were used. Bolds's spectral analysis of aircraft vibration and noise was called "substantial" and "instrumental" in suggesting ways to correct the adverse effects of the severe aeroacoustic environment created by operating high performance aircraft with their weapons bay doors open. Her work on helicopter vibration frequencies helped to demonstrate that the Helicopter Vibration Test Curve "M" in use in 1970 was inadequate, potentially allowing for many instances of field equipment failure.

In 1970 Bolds attended a symposium at the United States Air Force Academy where she was the only woman of 350 delegates. She published regular reports from the vibration and aeroelastic facilities. In 1979, she was awarded an Air Force Systems Command Certificate of Merit for her work.

She worked for the United States Air Force for over thirty years, including fifteen years working on the Northrop Grumman B-2 Spirit "stealth" bomber, and was celebrated by the Wright-Patterson Air Force Base as a Hidden Figure.

The Air Force bestowed her with the Air Force Systems Command Certificate of Merit for her 30 years of service and credited her with the enhancement of the Northrop Grumman B-2 Spirit “stealth” bomber.

She was inducted into the Dunbar High School Wall of Fame in 2017.

Bolds died on November 9, 2018. In 2019, she was one of the honorees in the "Dayton Skyscrapers" exhibit, presented by the Victoria Theatre Association and Shango: Center for The Study of African-American Art and Culture.

== Personal life ==
Bolds met her husband Elmer Graham Bolds at the Central State University. Bolds' daughter, Karen Beason, and son, Keith Bolds, both worked for the United States Air Force. Her granddaughter, Adrienne Ephrem, also studied engineering and works in the 711th Human Performance Wing. Bolds had a stroke in her early 40s, but continued to work. Bolds did not follow traditional gender roles, putting herself in a working role in STEM instead of a homemaking role.
