= Historic Inner East, Dayton, Ohio =

- Location within Ohio
- 39°45′24″N 84°10′23″W
- Location: Roughly bounded by Keowee (West), 3rd (North), Van Lear & Linden. (East) and US 35 (South), Dayton, Ohio

The Historic Inner East neighborhood is located in Dayton, Ohio, United States. The neighborhood boundaries include two historic districts: Saint Anne's Hill Historic District and Huffman Historic District. The neighborhood has a population of a little over 3,000 (as of 2010 census).
