= Meadowdale High School =

Meadowdale High School may refer to:

- Meadowdale High School (Ohio), Harrison Township, near Dayton, Ohio
- Meadowdale High School (Washington), Lynnwood, Washington
