= A Brighter Coming Day =

A Brighter Coming Day is a compilation of works by Frances Harper, written between 1853 and 1911. It is edited and introduced by contemporary literary scholar Frances Smith Foster and divides the text into four sections representing different periods of Harper's life and including her letters, poetry, essays, speeches, and short fiction.
