= Ponitz Career Technology Center =

School district in Ohio

David H. Ponitz Career Technology Center

Location
- 741 Washington Street; Dayton, Ohio 45402; United States
- Coordinates: 39.749681°N 84.202287°W

Information
- Type: Public Secondary
- Established: 2009
- Founder: David H. Ponitz
- Principal: Leonard Brown
- Staff: 58.00 (FTE)
- Grades: 9-12
- Enrollment: 763 (2017–18)
- Student to teacher ratio: 13.16
- Colors: Blue and Gold
- Athletics conference: Dayton City League
- Website: https://dps.k12.oh.us/david-h-ponitz-career-technology-center/

David H. Ponitz Career Technology Center is a technical school located in downtown Dayton, Ohio. Ponitz enrolls 800 students in grades 9-12 annually. Ponitz is also part of the Dayton Public School District.

== School information ==
Ponitz Career Technology Center was built in 2009 and serves as the city of Dayton's second career center. Ponitz offers career-technical certificates in:

- Arts and Communication including Radio/TV, Sports Marketing, Graphic Design, and Multimedia
- Business and Information Technology including Management, Finance, Networking, Programming, and Cosmetology
- Health and Education including Dental Assisting, Allied Health, Biotechnology, Public Safety, and STEM Academy
- Industrial and Engineering Systems including Construction, Engineering, and Automotive

Ponitz is also in a strong partnership with Sinclair Community College. Upon completion of their career community programs students are eligible for a $3000 scholarship to use for tuition, books and fees at Sinclair Community College. As well as college credits that were earned while in high school. Because Ponitz is a Career Center and not a typical high school, there can be a different experience than that associated with high schools. But with sports, and music the high school experience is still available.

The district-owned FM radio station WDPS broadcasts from studios at Ponitz Career Technology Center.

== See also ==
- Dayton Public School District
