= Sumlin =

Sumlin is a surname. Notable people with the surname include:

- Bernice I. Sumlin (1926–2018), American educator
- Hubert Sumlin (1931–2011), Chicago blues guitarist and singer
- Kevin Sumlin (born 1964), American football player and coach
