= Dobeleit =

Dobeleit is a German language surname of East Prussian origin. Notable people with the name include:

- Dick Dobeleit (1903–1978), American football player
- Norbert Dobeleit (1964), German television personality and retired athlete
