= Roz Young =

American author and educator (1912–2005)

- Young and her cat in 1991
- Born: Rosamond Eileen McPherson; October 4, 1912; Dayton, Ohio, U.S.
- Died: September 18, 2005 (aged 92); Dayton, Ohio, U.S.
- Resting place: Sugar Grove Cemetery in West Alexandria, Ohio
- Education: Oberlin College
- Occupations: Columnist; Biographer; Historian; Educator
- Spouse: William A. Young
- Writing career
- Period: 1953–2003
- Genres: Commentary, Nonfiction

Rosamond McPherson "Roz" Young (October 4, 1912 – September 18, 2005) was an author, educator, historian, and for more than 25 years a "beloved" columnist for The Dayton Daily News and, prior to that, The Journal Herald in Dayton, Ohio. Her columns appeared on the Op-Ed page at a time when few women received bylines outside the Women's Pages. She was noted for taking other writers to task for lapses in grammar and for frequently including mention of her cat, Edith, in her columns.

== Early life and education ==
Young was born in Dayton, Ohio on October 4, 1912, to artist Harry W. and Isabel Gilbert McPherson. She graduated from Dayton's Steele High School in 1930 and received a bachelor's degree (1934) and a Master's (1936) from Oberlin College.

== Early career ==
After receiving her degree in English literature from Oberlin College in 1934, Young applied for a job at the Dayton Journal, who told her "We don't hire women! But if you want to work for free, we'll let you." At her mother's insistence she returned to school to get a degree she could use to make a living. Young taught English, German, Latin and journalism for more than thirty years at Wilbur Wright and then High School, both in Dayton. "It took me until 1970 to work my way out of the classroom." She replaced "legendary" columnist Marj Heyduck, who died that year.

== Dayton Daily News columnist ==
Young's daily column "appeared opposite the Editorial page at a time when women writers were usually relegated to the Women's Page," which generally covered fashion, debuts, social events, and homemaking starting in 1970. In 1982 she semi-retired, writing a single column each week which appeared on Saturdays, until her death in 2005. She covered topics ranging from local history and culture to the current doings of her cat, Edith. She was noted for "tak(ing) others to task for grammatical lapses" in her columns; in an obituary on the Op-Ed page, the Dayton Daily News said "she'll correct God himself if he doesn't use the possessive with his gerunds." She assessed a 25-cent fine on colleagues who allowed grammatical errors to make it into print. Her 2005 obituary appeared on the front page of the Dayton Daily News.

== Reception and impact ==
The Dayton Foundation referred to her as "famed," and the University of Dayton as "beloved." The Dayton Daily News Editorial Board called her "a Dayton institution."

She often helped young women writers, "leaving some to wonder if she was giving them what she hadn't gotten early in her career." Novelist Trudy Krisher describes in a column after Young's death how Young had helped Krisher attract the attention of a literary agent. Novelist P. D. James described their friendship in a column memorializing Young.

The University of Dayton holds her library.

== Books ==
In addition to her weekly column, Young wrote academic textbooks, young adult biography and fiction, history, and popular literature. Her books were variously published under the names Rosamond McPherson, Rosamond McPherson Young, and Roz Young.

== Personal life ==
Young married former widower William A. Young, a director at Camp Kern, whom she met while researching the history of the YMCA for a book, in 1953. She was widowed in 1966.

She died August 18, 2005, and is buried at Sugar Grove Cemetery in West Alexandria, Ohio.

== Bibliography ==
- Edith, the Cat Who Ate an Elm Tree (2003)
- Dayton Comes of Age (2002, with Claudia Lynn Watson)
- Two Perfectly Marvelous Cats (1996)
- Cat, thy Name is Edith (1991)
- The Great Lady of First Street: Christ Episcopal Church, 150 Years (1981, with Catherine F. Booker)
- Twelve Second to the Moon: A Story of the Wright Brothers (1978)
- Queen of the North Parlor (1976)
- Continuing History of the Young Men's Christian Association of Dayton, Ohio 1953–1970 (1970)
- Mrs. Hedges' House (1967)
- Wilbur Was His Name (1967)
- The Spy With Two Hats (1966)
- Made of Aluminum: a Life of Charles Martin Hall (1965)
- Boss Ket: a Life of Charles F. Kettering (1961)
- A History of the Young Men's Christian Association of Dayton Ohio 1858–1953 (1953)

== Awards and honors ==
- 1985 Distinguished Daytonian
- 1994 Honorary Doctorate of Humane Letters from the University of Dayton
- 2003 Dayton Walk of Fame
- 2006 Rosamond M. Young Memorial Scholarship established
- 2015 Special Recognition, Stivers Hall of Fame
