= Young Men's Christian Association College =

Young Men's Christian Association College can mean one of several colleges or universities:

- Aurora University in Aurora, Illinois, USA
- Osaka Young Men's Christian Association College in Osaka, Japan
- Sinclair Community College in Dayton, Ohio, United States
