= Mary Borkowski =

American folklore artist (1916–2008)

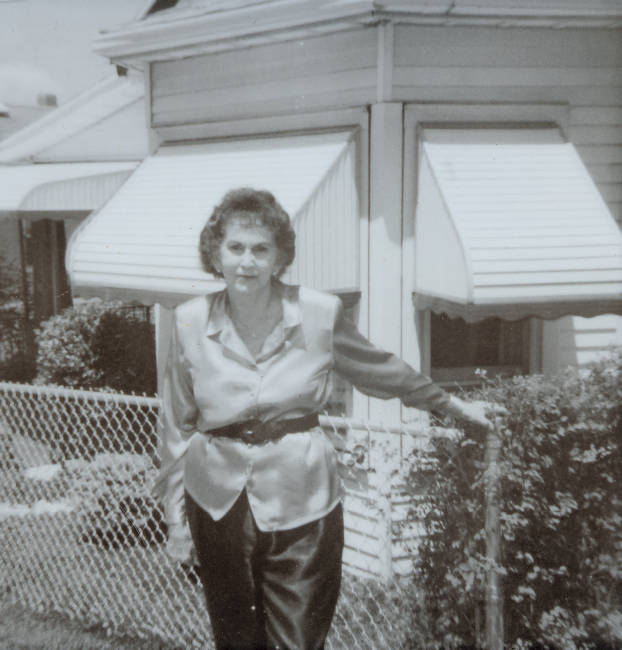
Borkowski circa 1970s

Mary Borkowski (March 28, 1916 – March 9, 2008) was an American fiber artist. She was nationally recognized as a folk artist for her innovations in the fields of fabric and thread art.

== Biography ==
Born as Mary Catherine Porter on March 28, 1916, in Sulphur Lick Springs, near Chillicothe, Ohio, Borkowski was the daughter of Joseph Porter and his wife Rena Hennes. She graduated from Stivers High School. She spent much of her life in Dayton, Ohio and started quilting in 1930. She never had formal training in art but learned quilting from her mother and grandmother. She later made "thread paintings", using her own technique.

Her "thread paintings", an artist practice from traditional quilting to a new genre in which works are created on silk, felt or velvet backgrounds with silk thread and yarn. She first made layering materials including canvas, and muslin, and then drawing on several art practices.

Her works are included in the collections of the Columbus Museum of Art, Ohio, American Folk Art Museum, New York City, the Smithsonian Institution, the Presidential Libraries of Bill Clinton and Richard Nixon, the Dayton Art Institute, the American Visionary Art Museum and Sinclair Community College.

Her works reflected her own life experiences. Some of her works include The Art Thief (1977), Depression Kids (1978), Greek Heritage (1982), and We are One, or Mother of Us All (1991).

She died on March 9, 2008, in Dayton, Ohio, at the age of 91.
