= Thurgood Marshall High School (Ohio) =

Location
- 4447 Hoover Ave; Dayton, Ohio 45417; United States
- Coordinates: 39°45′46″N 84°15′39″W

Information
- School type: Public Secondary School
- School board: Dayton Public Schools
- Principal: Chavin Lewis
- Staff: 34.00 (FTE)
- Grades: 9-12
- Enrollment: 525 (2023–2024)
- Student to teacher ratio: 15.44
- Language: English
- Area: Urban
- Colors: Purple and gold
- Athletics conference: Dayton City League
- Mascot: Cougar
- Website: Thurgood Marshall Website

Thurgood Marshall High School is a public high school in Dayton, Ohio. The school is named for the late African American pioneering civil rights attorney and Supreme Court Justice Thurgood Marshall. The school was established in 2007.

== About ==
Thurgood Marshall High School was formed in 2007 after the merger of Colonel White High School and Nettie Lee Roth Middle School. Roth had previously been a high school until it was converted to a middle school in 1982. Thurgood Marshall was built on the former site of Roth and decided to use Colonel White's nickname of the "Cougars." The school colors are purple and gold, purple being from Roth's purple & white and the gold from Colonel White's green & gold.

Thurgood Marshall students select either the School of Humanities and Cultural Studies or Service and Leadership as ninth graders. Incoming freshmen apply for admission into the AMA (Academic Magnet Academy) and are accepted based upon meeting the program's entrance requirements. These learning communities are designed to prepare students for entrance into colleges and universities of higher learning.

== Clubs / Organizations ==
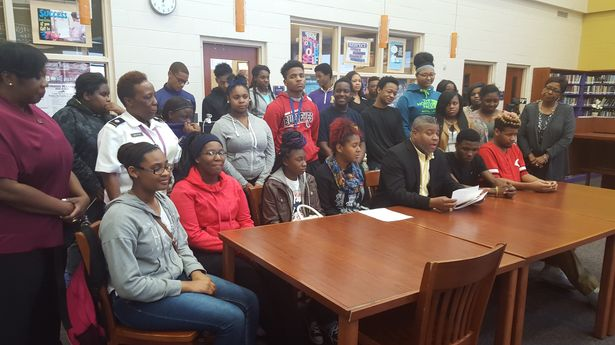
Dayton NAACP President Derrick Foward holds press conference to announce the first NAACP High School Chapter in the State of Ohio history.

NAACP High School Chapter

- Thurgood Marshall High School is the home of the first NAACP High School Chapter in the State of Ohio. The Move Forward Thurgood Marshall NAACP High School Chapter was founded and officially chartered by the NAACP National Board of Directors on February 20, 2016. It was named in honor of two Civil Rights activists, Thurgood Marshall and Dayton NAACP President Derrick L. Foward. The chapter's mission is to “Develop the next generation of Community and Civil Rights Leaders.” The first elected Officers were Dariana Tolliver, President; Amanda McClellon, 1st Vice President; Jayiana Pooler, Secretary; Rahjae Mack, Assistant Secretary; Shemaya Wingard, Treasurer; and Briana Thomas, Assistant Treasurer. The first elected Advisor was LTC (R) Claudia L. Mason. The first appointed High Executive Committee Member was Malcolm Hazelton.

== Ohio High School Athletic Association State Championships ==
- Boys Basketball – 1976*, 1981*, 1982*, 1990+
- Boys Track and Field - 1976*, 1981*, 1982*

* titles won by Nettie Lee Roth High School prior to that school closing
+ titles won by Colonel White High School prior to that school closing

== Notable alumni ==
- Dwight Anderson (1960–2020), basketball player
- Keith Byars (born 1963), former NFL player, graduated from Nettie Lee Roth High School prior to that school closing
- Joe Thomasson (born 1993), basketball player in the Israel Basketball Premier League
