= Roosevelt High School (Dayton, Ohio) =

Location
- 2013 West Third Street; Dayton, Ohio 45417; United States; 39.754232°N 84.227695°W

Information
- Type: Public
- Opened: 1923
- Closed: 1975
- School district: Dayton Public Schools
- Grades: 9–12
- Campus type: Urban
- Colors: Red and White
- Athletics conference: Dayton City League
- Team name: Teddy Bears/Teddies

Roosevelt High School was a public high school in Dayton, Ohio, United States, that was part of the Dayton Public Schools. The school was named for U.S. President Theodore Roosevelt and opened in 1923. At the time of its construction, it was believed to have been the largest high school in the eastern U.S. Athletic teams competed in the Dayton City League and were known as the "Teddy Bears" or "Teddies" with school colors of red and white. The school closed in 1975 and the building was used for school district offices and other functions. It was demolished in 2008 to make way for the Dayton Boys Preparatory Academy, an elementary school for boys in grades kindergarten through eight, which opened in December 2010. Many architectural elements from the Roosevelt High School building were saved and incorporated into the new academy, and the area around the building is known as the Roosevelt Commons.

== Notable alumni ==
- Lowell Caylor, professional football player in the National Football League (NFL)
- Frances Smith Foster, professor of African-American studies and women's history
- John Henderson, professional football player in the NFL
- Cal Hogue, pitcher Pittsburgh Pirates 1952-54 (MLB)
- Barbara O. Jones, actress
- Jack V. Mackmull, U.S. Army lieutenant general
- Alex Rado, professional football player in the NFL
- Ted Ross, actor (attended Roosevelt but did not graduate)
- William Edwin Self, former actor and producer
