= WDPS =

Radio station in Dayton, Ohio

- Dayton, Ohio; United States
- Broadcast area: Dayton
- Frequency: 89.5 MHz

Programming
- Format: Jazz

Ownership
- Owner: Dayton City Schools

History
- First air date: 1961

Technical information
- Licensing authority: FCC
- Facility ID: 15880
- Class: A
- ERP: 6,000 Watts
- HAAT: 64 meters
- Transmitter coordinates: 39°45′28″N 84°11′36″W

Links
- Public license information: Public file; LMS
- Webcast: Listen Live
- Website: Official site

WDPS (89.5 FM) (for: Dayton Public Schools and its nickname Dayton's Power Source") is a radio station broadcasting a Jazz format. It serves its city of license, Dayton, Ohio, United States. The station is currently owned by Dayton Public Schools. Its programming is aired weekdays during school hours during the curricular school year. The frequency is shared with WQRP which airs a gospel music format when WDPS programming ends after the school day. According to a Dayton Daily News story dated July 21, 2009, the station has moved to new studios located in the David H. Ponitz Career Technology Center at 741 West Washington St. A switch to a "real jazz" format has also taken place.

== See also ==
- List of jazz radio stations in the United States
