= Dunbar High School (Dayton, Ohio) =

Coordinates: 39°44′01″N 84°13′52″W

Location
- 1400 Albritton Drive; Dayton, Ohio 45408; United States

Information
- School type: Public Secondary School
- Founded: 1931
- School board: Dayton Public Schools
- Principal: Crystal Phillips
- Staff: 30.00 (FTE)
- Grades: 9-12
- Enrollment: 528 (2023–2024)
- Student to teacher ratio: 17.60
- Language: English
- Area: Urban
- Colors: Blue and White
- Athletics conference: Dayton City League
- Mascot: Wolverine
- Team name: Dayton Dunbar Wolverines
- Website: Dunbar High School Website

Paul Laurence Dunbar High School is part of Dayton City Schools. The school is located in Dayton, Ohio, and serves approximately 550 students. The school is named after poet Paul Laurence Dunbar, a Dayton native. The school mascot is the wolverine.

== About ==
Paul Laurence Dunbar High School is the only historically African-American high school in Dayton. It was created to educate African-American youth and to employ teachers of color. The school originally opened on Summit Street in 1933 and graduated its first class in 1936. In 1962 a new Dunbar high school was opened and the original building was renamed MacFarlane Elementary after Paul Laurence Dunbar's first principal, Mr. Frederic Charles MacFarlane. MacFarlane later became a middle school, it closed in 2003 and was razed in 2005.

Dunbar competes in the Dayton City League.

== Notable alumni ==
- Mark Baker, Dayton Public Schools athletic director, former Ohio State, and NBA basketball player
- Phyllis Bolds, physicist at the United States Air Force
- Cornelius Cash, former NBA player
- Norris Cole, basketball player for JL Bourg Basket and 2x champion
- Daequan Cook, former NBA player, in the Israeli Basketball Premier League
- Na'Shan Goddard, South Carolina and NFL
- Johnny Green, former NBA player
- Geron Johnson, basketball player, Memphis and Developmental League
- Jerry Jones, former NFL player
- Kelvin Kirk, first Mr. Irrelevant and CFL player
- Jerry McKee, ABA basketball player
- C. J. McLin, Ohio State Representative
- Rhine McLin, Mayor of Dayton
- Joseph Scates, NFL player for the Jacksonville Jaguars
- Bernice I. Sumlin, 19th international president of Alpha Kappa Alpha
- Desiree Tims, member of the Ohio House of Representatives
- Dan Wilkinson, Ohio State University, first round NFL draft choice for the Cincinnati Bengals.

== Ohio High School Athletic Association State Championships ==
- Boys Basketball – 1987, 2006, 2007, 2010, 2012
- Boys Track and Field – 1948, 1963, 1964, 1988, 1989, 1990, 2012, 2014, 2015, 2017
- Girls Basketball – 1991

=== Other Non-Sanctioned State Championships ===
- Boys Track & Field Indoor State Champions (OATCCC) - 2011, 2012, 2014, 2015, 2016,2017,2018
