= Lowell Caylor =

American football player (born 1941)

No. 22
- Position: Defensive back

Personal information
- Born: June 17, 1941 (age 85); Dayton, Ohio, U.S.
- Listed height: 6 ft 3 in (1.91 m)
- Listed weight: 205 lb (93 kg)

Career information
- High school: Roosevelt (Dayton)
- College: Miami (OH)
- NFL draft: 1963: 16th round, 221 (by the Chicago Bears)th overall pick

Career history
- Cleveland Browns (1964)

Awards and highlights
- NFL champion (1964)
- Stats at Pro Football Reference

Lowell Howard Caylor (born June 17, 1941) is an American former professional football player who was a defensive back for one season with the Cleveland Browns of the National Football League (NFL). He played college football for the Miami RedHawks.
