= Huffman Historic District =

Historic district in Ohio, United States

- U.S. National Register of Historic Places
- U.S. Historic district
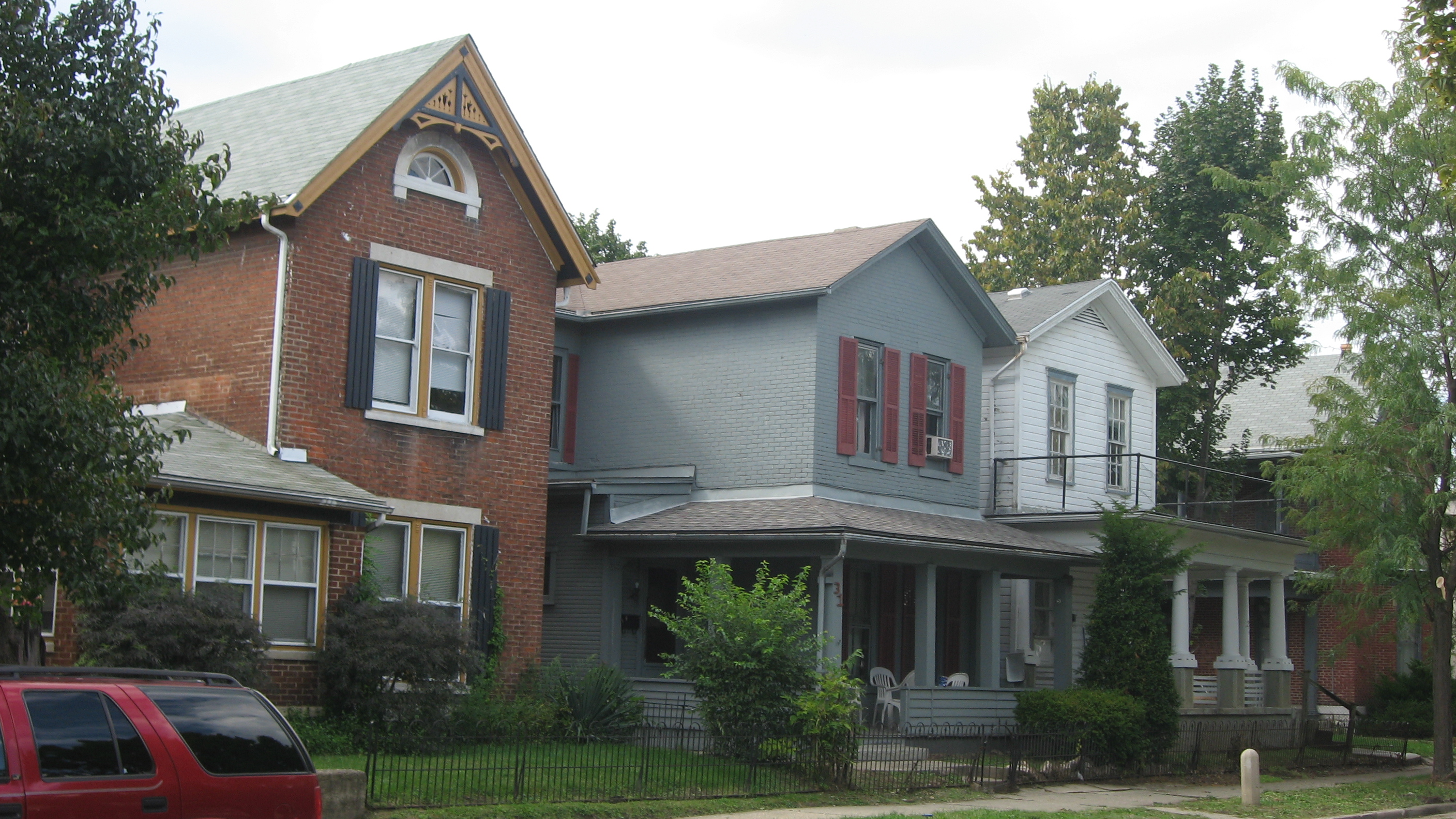
- Houses along Huffman Avenue

- Location within Ohio Location within the United States
- Location: Roughly bounded by E. 3rd., Hamilton, Van Lear and Beckel Sts., Dayton, Ohio
- Coordinates: 39°45′41″N 84°9′59″W
- Area: 85 acres (0.34 km^{2}; 0.133 mi^{2})
- Architectural style: Italianate, Queen Anne, Neoclassical
- NRHP reference No.: 82003618
- Added to NRHP: August 24, 1982

The Huffman Historic District is a historic section of the Historic Inner East neighborhood in Dayton, Ohio, United States. Formed at the end of the nineteenth century primarily by a wealthy businessman, it has long been home to people of many different occupations and numerous places on the social ladder. After seeing very few changes throughout the twentieth century, it was named a historic site in the 1980s.

William P. Huffman was both a banker and a real estate developer; although some of the land in the neighborhood had already been developed before Huffman became involved, he spurred development by arranging for the construction of a street railway on Third Street. The area's early residents occupied numerous places on the socioeconomic spectrum, ranging from laborers to merchants and artisans to executives. Their presence together in the neighborhood can still be seen in the built environment, most of which was built between 1870 and 1890. Several major architectural styles of the late nineteenth century appear in the district, including the Gothic Revival, Italianate, and Queen Anne. Although the district's peak period of growth ended by 1890, construction continued over the next decade, but virtually nothing was built after 1900. Minimal changes since that time have left the neighborhood resembling its appearance of over a century ago, preserving it as an example of late 19th-century developmental patterns.

In mid-1982, the Huffman Historic District was officially declared and listed on the National Register of Historic Places, qualifying both because of the buildings' well preserved architecture and because of the entire district's connection to William P. Huffman. One of nineteen National Register-listed historic districts in the city, it is located immediately northeast of another, Saint Anne's Hill. The district comprises properties on sixteen streets in eastern Dayton, almost directly to the east of downtown. Its boundaries encompass 85 acres (0.34 km^{2}; 0.133 mi^{2}). At the time the district was designated, it comprised 668 buildings, of which 663 were deemed contributing properties and 5 non-contributing; the ratio of contributing to non-contributing is far higher than in most historic districts in the United States, reflective of the lack of construction within the district since 1900.

== See also ==
- National Register of Historic Places listings in Dayton, Ohio
