= Doug France =

American football player (1953–2016)

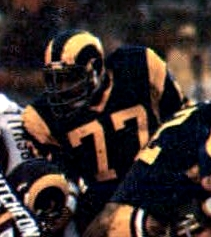
- France with the Los Angeles Rams in 1977

No. 77
- Position: Offensive tackle

Personal information
- Born: April 26, 1953; Dayton, Ohio, U.S.
- Died: April 8, 2016 (aged 62); Las Vegas, Nevada, U.S.
- Listed height: 6 ft 5 in (1.96 m)
- Listed weight: 270 lb (122 kg)

Career information
- High school: Colonel White (OH)
- College: Ohio State
- NFL draft: 1975: 1st round, 20th overall pick

Career history
- Los Angeles Rams (1975–1981); Houston Oilers (1983)

Awards and highlights
- Second-team All-Pro (1978); 2× Pro Bowl (1977, 1978); PFWA All-Rookie Team (1975); Second-team All-American (1974); First-team All-Big Ten (1974)

Career NFL statistics
- Games played: 110
- Games started: 87
- Fumble recoveries: 2
- Stats at Pro Football Reference

Frederick Douglas France Jr. (April 26, 1953 – April 8, 2016) was an American professional football player who was a tackle for eight seasons in the National Football League (NFL), primarily with the Los Angeles Rams. He played college football for the Ohio State Buckeyes.

== Football career ==
France attended and played football at Colonel White High School in Dayton, Ohio.

France played tight end for Ohio State (1971–74).

France was drafted in the first round as the 20th pick in the 1975 NFL Draft by the Los Angeles Rams after the team selected Dennis Harrah with the 11th pick. France played for the Los Angeles Rams for seven years and went to the Pro Bowl for two straight years (1977–78). Then France spent one season with the Houston Oilers in 1983.

After retiring from the NFL he attempted to become an actor before becoming a high school offensive line coach at La Quinta High School, Westminster, CA. He died on April 8, 2016, in Las Vegas, Nevada.
