= Meadowdale High School (Ohio) =

Coordinates: 39°48′48″N 84°15′05″W

Meadowdale Career Technology Center

Location
- 3873 Whitestone Ct. Dayton, Ohio 45416; U.S.

Information
- School type: Public Secondary School
- School board: Dayton Public Schools
- Principal: Eddie Davis
- Staff: 40.00 (FTE)
- Grades: 9–12
- Enrollment: 519 (2023–2024)
- Student to teacher ratio: 12.98
- Language: English
- Area: Urban
- Colors: Black and Gold
- Athletics conference: Dayton City League
- Mascot: Lion
- Website: Meadowdale High School Website

Meadowdale High School is part of Dayton City Schools. Located in Harrison Township, near Dayton, Ohio, United States, it serves approximately 1000 students. The school mascot is the lion.

== About ==
Meadowdale did not meet any of the 12 state indicators for the 2007–2008 school year remaining in "Academic Watch" rating. .

== Clubs and activities ==
- National Honor Society
- Student Council
- Chess Club

== Notable alumni ==
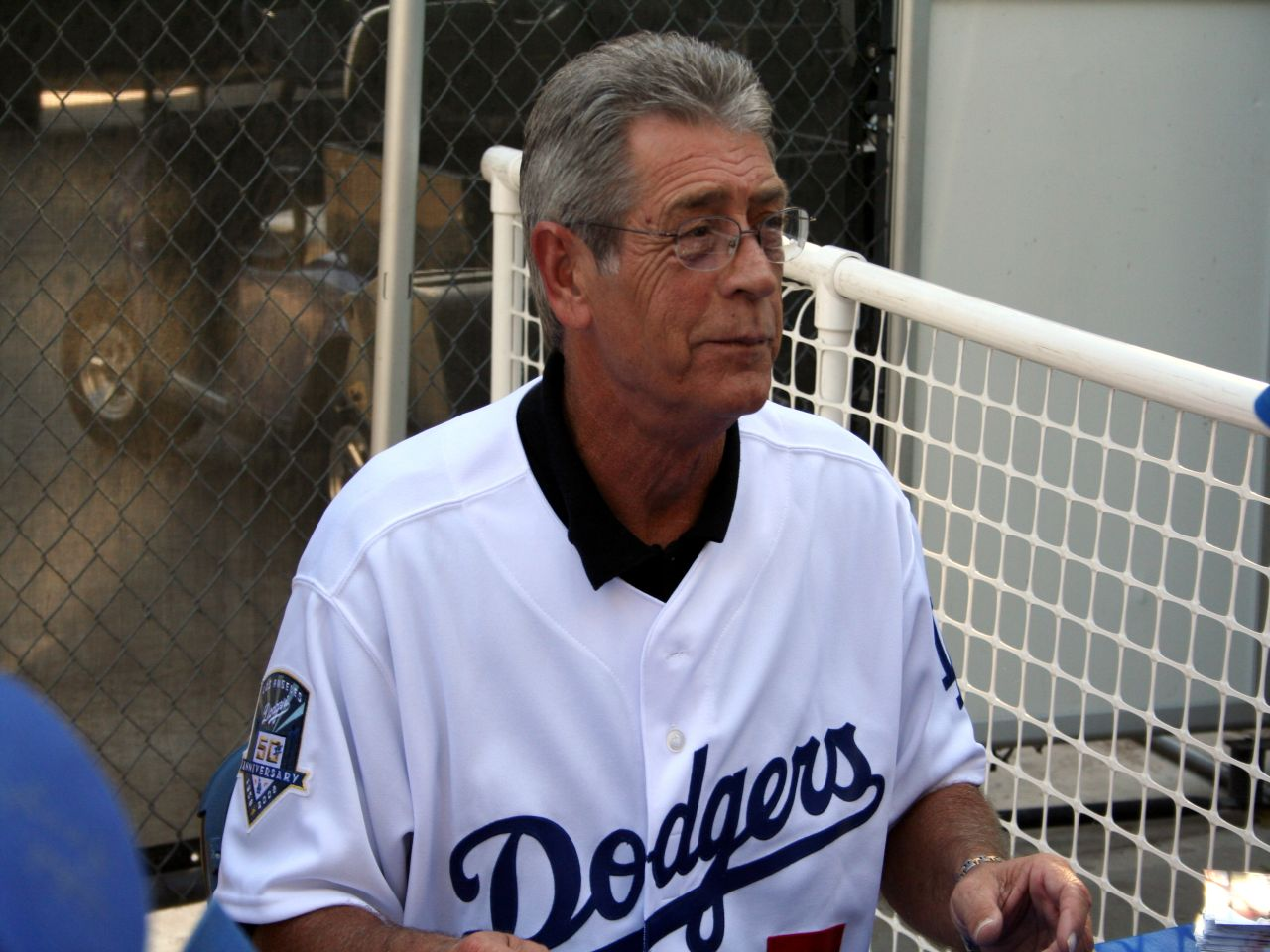
Steve Yeager

- Tonja Buford-Bailey, USA Track & Field athlete
- Derek Bunch, former NFL linebacker
- Kelly Brown Douglas, theologian
- Irv Eatman, USFL, NFL, UCLA tackle
- Melissa Fay Greene, author
- Andy McCullough, Arena Football League wide receiver
- George Nicholas, collegiate and professional runner
- Stephen Nichols, actor, General Hospital and more
- Aaron Patrick, NFL outside linebacker
- Mike Pratt, University of Kentucky basketball
- Peerless Price, National Football League wide receiver
- Taliaferro Sebastian, visual artist
- Derrick Shepard, professional football player and coach
- Rick Smith, Houston Texans general manager
- Sheldon White, National Football League cornerback
- Steve Yeager (born 1948), Los Angeles Dodgers catcher
- Darius Coleman (born 2003), Chicago Bears Equipment Manager
