= Derek Bunch =

American football player (born 1961)

No. 92
- Position: Linebacker

Personal information
- Born: October 28, 1961 (age 65); Dayton, Ohio, U.S.
- Listed height: 6 ft 3 in (1.91 m)
- Listed weight: 215 lb (98 kg)

Career information
- High school: Meadowdale (Harrison Township, Ohio)
- College: Michigan State
- NFL draft: 1985: undrafted

Career history
- San Francisco 49ers (1985–1986)*; Minnesota Vikings (1987)*; Washington Redskins (1987)
- * Offseason or practice squad member only

Career NFL statistics
- Games played: 3
- Stats at Pro Football Reference

Derek Carl Bunch (born October 28, 1961) is an American former professional football player who was a linebacker for the Washington Redskins of the National Football League (NFL). He played college football for the Michigan State Spartans. In 2018, Bunch was awarded a Super Bowl ring for playing as a replacement player for the Redskins in 1987, the year they won Super Bowl XXII.

== Career ==
Bunch played for the Michigan State Spartans in college. He was on the starting team during his senior year, alongside Carl Banks, after being injured the previous year. The team's position coach, Norm Parker, decided to keep Bunch and Banks on the same sides of the field throughout the season, unlike previous years where linebackers would move around based on the strength of the formation.

Bunch was selected by the Portland Breakers of the United States Football League (USFL), but he declined to join the 1985 NFL draft, where he went undrafted. He joined the San Francisco 49ers in 1985, but was cut from the team. He was also cut by the 49ers in 1986 and the Minnesota Vikings in 1987. In 1987, the Washington Redskins hired him to be a replacement player on the team. He played three games, winning each one. He got half a share of playoff money, amounting to roughly 27,000 dollars.

Bunch, along with the other replacements, was mentioned in an ESPN documentary titled Year of the Scab and was the inspiration for the 2000 film The Replacements. In 2018, Bunch was awarded a Super Bowl ring for playing for the Redskins in 1987, the year they won Super Bowl XXII.

== Personal life ==
Bunch has a wife named Pyper, and three children, named Kristin, Derek Jr., and Dominion.
