= Carl Mankat =

American football player (1904–1963)

Profile
- Positions: End, tackle, guard

Personal information
- Born: January 13, 1904; Dayton, Ohio, U.S.
- Died: November 21, 1963 (aged 59); Dayton, Ohio, U.S.
- Listed height: 6 ft 3 in (1.91 m)
- Listed weight: 208 lb (94 kg)

Career information
- College: Colgate

Career history
- Dayton Triangles (1928–1929)

Career statistics
- Games: 12

Carl Robert Mankat (January 13, 1904 – November 21, 1963), sometimes known as "Abe Mankat", was an American football player. He played college football for Colgate from 1924 to 1927 and in the National Football League for the Dayton Triangles in 1928 and 1929.

== Early life ==
Mankat was born in Dayton, Ohio, in 1904 and attended Steele High School in that city. He played football and basketball at Steele from 1922 to 1924.

== Colgate ==
He then played college football at Colgate. He was selected as captain of Colgate's freshman football team in 1924, and played at the end and tackle positions for Colgate's varsity from 1925 to 1927. He was selected by the New York World as a third-team player on the 1926 All-America college football team. He blocked punts against Syracuse in both 1925 and 1926. The Pittsburgh Press in 1926 wrote:

One of the stars of the Colgate eleven is "Abe" Mankat, tackle. ... He leaped practically overnight from a high school and freshman star into the spotlight of the gridiron world ... His ability to tear through the line and block kicks made him famous last year, and from the way he has started this fall, it looks as if he would surpass himself.

== Professional football ==
He next played professional football in the National Football League (NFL) as an end, tackle, and guard for the Dayton Triangles He appeared in 12 NFL games, seven as a starter, during the 1928 and 1929 seasons.

== Later life ==
After retiring from football, Mankat worked as a salesman for Shur-Good Biscuit Co. He and his wife, Isabel, had two sons (Carl Jr. and John M.) and one daughter (Marjorie). He died in 1963 at age 59 at Grandview Hospital in Dayton.
