= Larry Knorr =

American football player (1917–1996)

Profile
- Position: End

Personal information
- Born: April 22, 1917; New York, New York
- Died: November 26, 1996 (aged 79); Springboro, Ohio
- Listed height: 6 ft 2 in (1.88 m)
- Listed weight: 192 lb (87 kg)

Career information
- High school: Stivers (OH)
- College: Dayton

Career history
- Detroit Lions (1942, 1945)

Career statistics
- Games: 10
- Stats at Pro Football Reference

Lawrence Frank Knorr (April 22, 1917 – November 26, 1996) was an American football player.

Knorr was born in New York City in 1917. He attended Stivers High School in Dayton, Ohio. He then attended the University of Dayton where he was a multi sport athlete who received nine varsity letters. He gained the greatest acclaim playing as an end for the Dayton Flyers football team from 1937 to 1939. He was chosen for the College All-Star team that played the Cleveland Rams in the 1940 preseason. He was later inducted into the University of Dayton Football Hall of Fame.

He played professional football in the National Football League (NFL) as an end for the Detroit Lions. He appeared in eight NFL games in 1942 and two more in 1945.

His professional football career was interrupted by service in the United States Navy during World War II. He was a PT boat captain and reached the rank of lieutenant. He received a Purple Cross, a Distinguished Service Cross, and the Croix de Guerre. After his football career ended, Knorr worked for National Cash Register and Mead Corporation. In retirement, he moved to Jupiter, Florida. He died in Florida in 1996 at age 79.
