= Stivers School for the Arts =

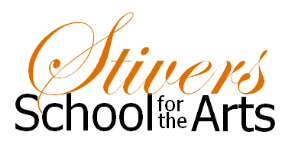

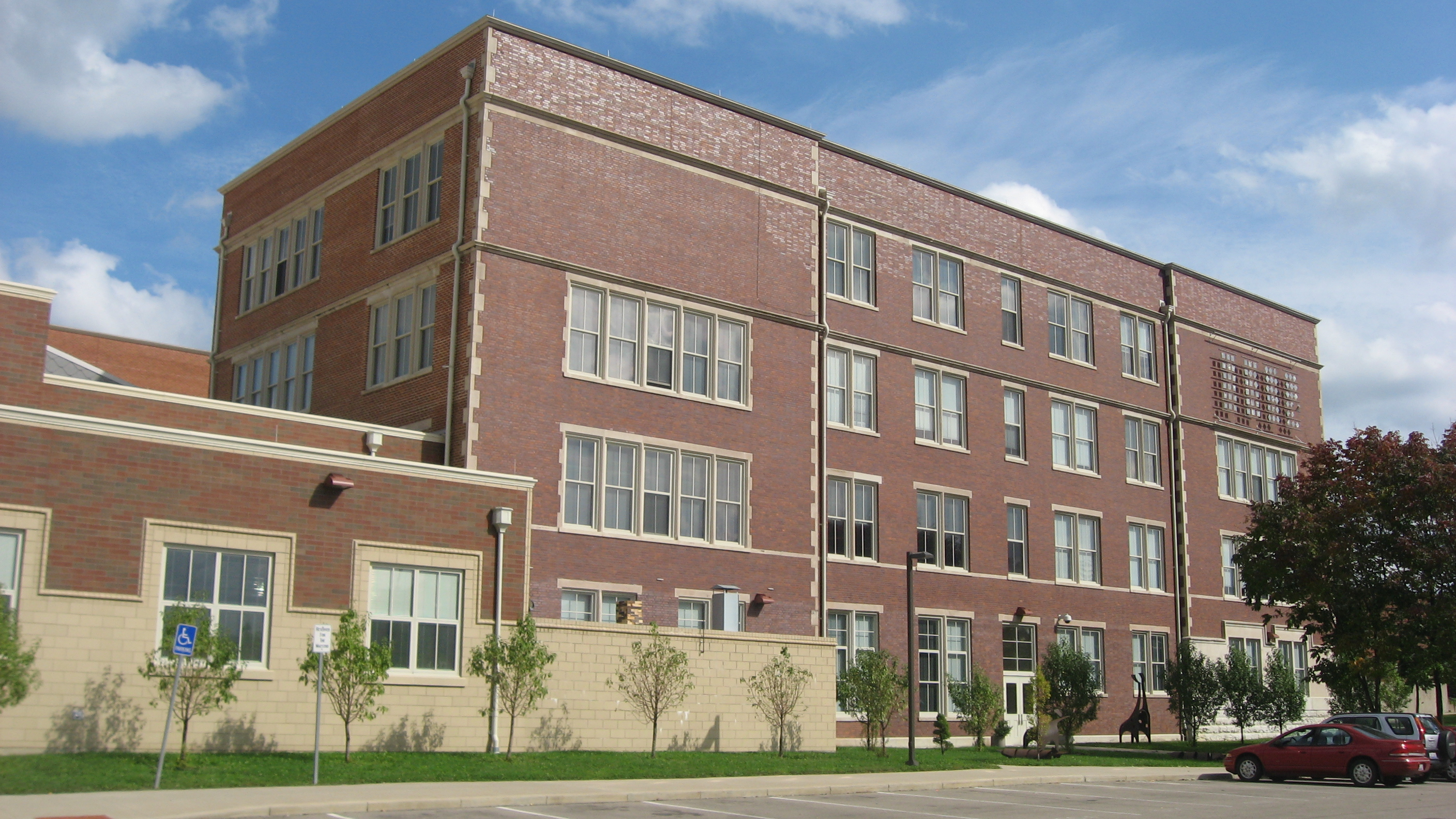
- Western Side of Stivers High School

Location
- 1313 E. Fifth St. Dayton, Ohio 45402; U.S.
- 39°45′33″N 84°10′31″W

Information
- School type: Public Magnet Secondary School
- Motto: Giving Our Best Performance
- Founded: 1908
- School board: Dayton City Schools District
- Superintendent: David Lawrence
- Principal: Paul Waller
- Teaching staff: 51.00 (FTE)
- Grades: 7-12
- Enrollment: 835 (2023–2024)
- Student to teacher ratio: 16.37
- Language: English
- Area: Urban
- Colors: Orange and Black
- Athletics conference: Dayton City League
- Mascot: Tiger
- Team name: Stivers Tigers
- Newspaper: The Tiger Times
- Website: https://dps.k12.oh.us/stivers-school-for-the-arts/

Stivers School for the Arts is a magnet school in the Dayton City Schools in Dayton, Ohio, USA, in the St. Anne's Hill Historic District neighborhood. It is a public middle and high school that focuses on education in the visual and performing arts. U.S. News & World Report consistently ranks Stivers among America's best high schools.

== History ==
Stivers Manual Training High School was built in 1908 at 1313 East 5th Street in Dayton. It was designed by renowned Dayton architect Charles Insco Williams. The original building is Dayton Publics oldest operating school.

It was Stivers High School until 1974 when it merged with Patterson Co-op High School and then in the mid-1980s it became a middle school. The last class to graduate as Stivers High School was 1976. It became both a middle and high school in the mid-1990s, graduating its first (new) high school class in 2000.

== Renovation ==
Stivers was renovated and the students went temporarily to the Homewood Campus. The current Stivers reopened on October 29, 2008. The class of 2008 was the first class to graduate from the renovated building. Students enter Stivers at the 7th grade level by audition and may stay until they graduate in 12th grade. The school currently has around 920 students in grades 7-12.

== Programs ==
Stivers offers programs in piano, band, orchestra, dance, theatre, creative writing, choir, and visual arts as well as a full range of quality academics. Special features of the Arts programs include weekly, individualized instruction, special seminars, master classes and extensive opportunities for performance and creative expression. Students are provided instruction through one-on-one contact with many of the community's leading professional and performing artists.

Art themes are integrated into the general curriculum.

Milton Caniff is a famous Stivers alumnus. He was a cartoonist and at times in his cartoons referenced a high school called St. Ivers, a reference to his alma mater. Stivers honored Caniff's legacy by renaming part of South Clinton Street (adjacent to Fifth St.) "Milton Caniff Drive".

== Curriculum and activities ==
- Academic: Required and elective college preparatory courses including Advanced Placement Courses
- Athletic and a number of enrichment programs designed to integrate the abilities of the well-rounded student. Such activities include: Freshman, JV Boys and Girls Basketball, Varsity Boys and Girls Basketball, Varsity Girls Volleyball, Varsity Golf, Varsity Cross-country Varsity Boys and Girls Soccer, Cheerleading, Varsity Swimming, Varsity Wrestling, Pep Squad, Track and field, Girls and Boys Tennis, JCOWA (Junior Council on World Affairs), Debate Club, Math Olympics, Yearbook Committee, Newspaper, Muse Machine
- Foreign language offerings include Spanish and French. They are available for all students.
- Honors and advanced placement opportunities are available in: English, Mathematics, Foreign Language, Levels III & IV of all eight art magnets. Advanced placement courses available are: AP Literature, AP Language, AP Calculus, AP Biology, AP Chemistry, AP European History, AP U.S. History, AP Government, AP Spanish Language, AP Music Theory, AP World History, AP Human Geography, AP Environmental Science

Courses in arts magnet areas include:

- Visual Arts - Drawing, Painting, Animation, Sculpting, Computer Graphics, Photography, Printmaking and Ceramics
- Creative Writing - Beginning through advanced classes, journalism, film appreciation,
- Orchestra - Beginning through advanced classes
- Band - Beginning through advanced classes, Jazz Band
- Dance - Beginning through advanced classes in Ballet, Jazz, and Modern dance
- Theatre - Beginning through advanced classes in Acting, Technical Theatre
- Choral Music - General Choir, Show Choir, and other specialized choral groups
- Piano- Beginning through advanced piano classes, music theory, musicianship

== seedling Foundation ==
The seedling Foundation is a non-profit organization established to benefit Stivers School for the Arts. The foundation's purpose is to support the Arts Programs at Stivers by providing funds for guest artists, scholarship programs, and other educational pursuits. The organization consists of parents, alumni, and community leaders. Donations are accepted by the seedling Foundation for the current capital campaign.

== Recognitions ==
- Honored by U.S. News & World Report as being among America's best public high schools, earning Silver Medal in 2015.
- The highly-decorated Stivers Jazz Orchestra won the national championships at Berklee College of Music High School Jazz Festival in 2004, 2008, and 2011.

== Ohio High School Athletic Association State Championships ==
- Boys Basketball - 1924,1928,1929,1930,
- Girls Track and Field – 1976

== Notable alumni ==
- Mary Borkowski, textile artist
- Milton Caniff, cartoonist
- Bobby Colburn, former professional basketball player
- Garry Cooper, Co-founder and CEO or Rheaply
- Pat Duffy, former NFL back, Dayton Triangles
- Brandon Patrick George, flutist
- Chuck Grigsby, former professional basketball player
- Marj Heyduck, Dayton Daily News columnist
- Bill Hosket Sr., former professional basketball player
- Toccara Jones, model
- Larry Knorr, former NFL end, Detroit Lions
- Jim Morgan, former basketball player and racehorse trainer
- Frankie Sanders, former professional basketball player
- Frank Sillin, former NFL back, Dayton Triangles
- Frank Stanton, former president and vice chairman of CBS
- Carl Storck (1892–1950), founder and top executive of the National Football League
- David Tendlar, animator
- Dutch Thiele, former NFL end and center, Dayton Triangles

== Notable faculty ==
- Floyd Stahl, football, basketball, baseball coach
- Harry Wilhelm, football coach
- Roz Young, Dayton Daily News columnist
