= Chuck Grigsby =

American basketball player

Personal information
- Born: August 15, 1928 Dayton, Ohio
- Died: July 15, 2003 (aged 74) Kettering, Ohio
- Listed height: 6 ft 6 in (1.98 m)
- Listed weight: 190 lb (86 kg)

Career information
- High school: Stivers (Dayton, Ohio)
- College: Dayton (1948–1952)
- NBA draft: 1952: 3rd round, 21st overall pick
- Drafted by: Baltimore Bullets
- Playing career: 1954–1955
- Position: Small forward
- Number: 17, 43

Career history

Playing
- 1954–1955: New York Knicks

Coaching
- 1960–1964: Stivers HS
- 1964–1969: Dayton (assistant)

Career NBA statistics
- Points: 16 (2.3 ppg)
- Rebounds: 11 (1.6 rpg)
- Assists: 7 (1.0 apg)
- Stats at NBA.com
- Stats at Basketball Reference

Charles L. Grigsby (August 15, 1928 – July 15, 2003) was an American professional basketball player. Grigsby was selected in the 1952 NBA draft by the Baltimore Bullets after a collegiate career at Dayton. He played for the New York Knicks in 1954–55 in only seven games, averaging 2.3 points, 1.6 rebounds and 1.0 assists per contest. He was later an assistant coach at the University of Dayton with close friend and colleague, Don Donoher. Prior to that he coached and taught at Stivers High School. He had one daughter, Nancy Grigsby, who co-founded the Artemis Center, a center based in Dayton that helps victims of domestic violence.

== Career statistics ==
Legend
GP	Games played	GS	Games started	MPG	Minutes per game
FG%	Field goal percentage	3P%	3-point field goal percentage	FT%	Free throw percentage
RPG	Rebounds per game	APG	Assists per game	SPG	Steals per game
BPG	Blocks per game	PPG	Points per game	**Bold**	Career high

=== NBA ===
==== Regular season ====
Year	Team	GP	MPG	FG%	FT%	RPG	APG	PPG
1954–55	New York	7	6.4	.368	.250	1.6	1.0	2.3
