= Aaron Patrick =

American former football player (born 1996)

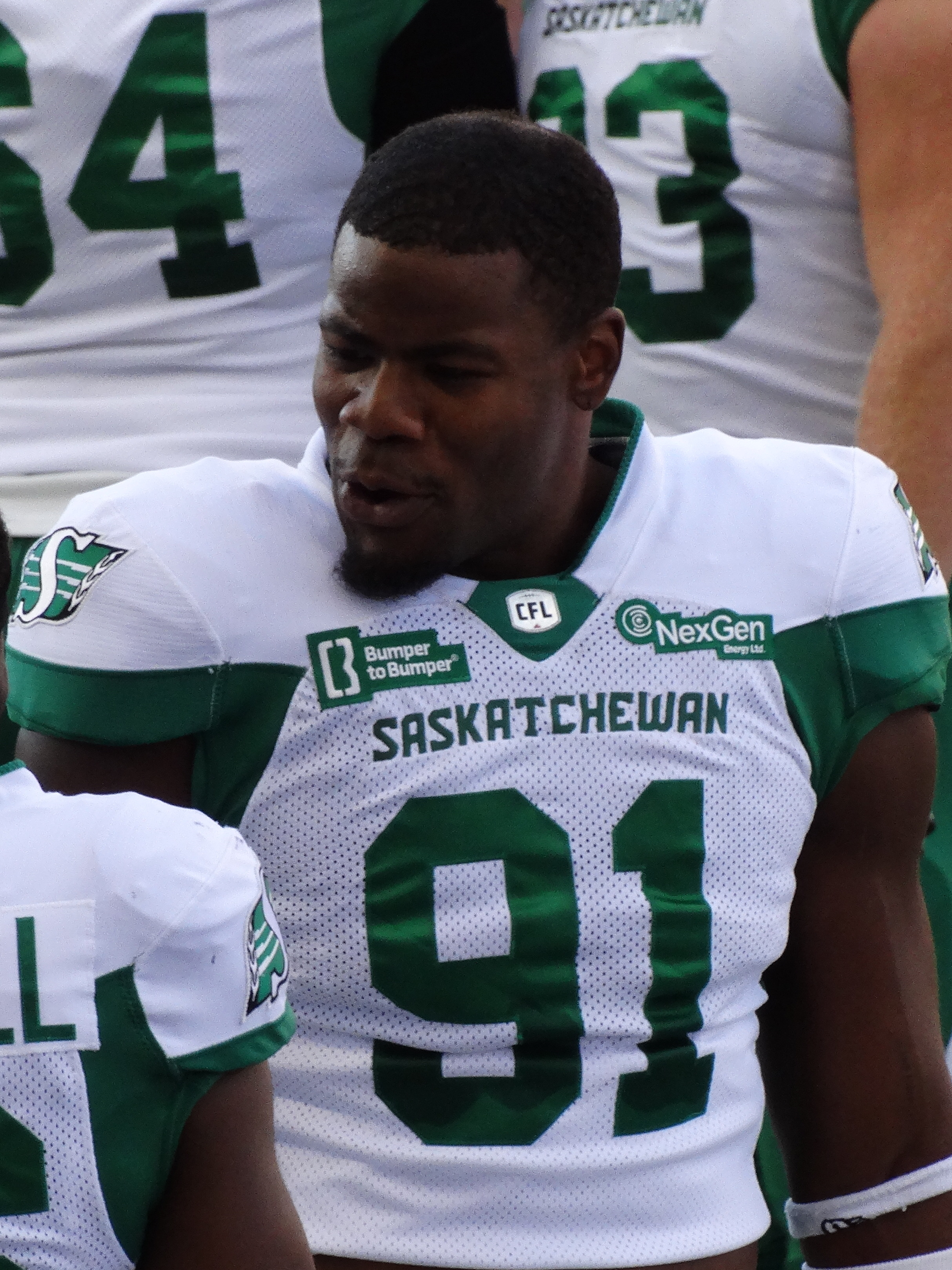
- Patrick with the Saskatchewan Roughriders in 2025

No. 94 – Saskatchewan Roughriders
- Position: Defensive lineman
- CFL status: American

Personal information
- Born: December 21, 1996 (age 29); Dayton, Ohio, U.S.
- Listed height: 6 ft 5 in (1.96 m)
- Listed weight: 245 lb (111 kg)

Career information
- High school: Meadowdale (Harrison Township, Ohio)
- College: Eastern Kentucky
- NFL draft: 2020: undrafted

Career history
- Jacksonville Jaguars (2020–2021)*; Denver Broncos (2021–2022); Saskatchewan Roughriders (2025–present)
- * Offseason or practice squad member only

Awards and highlights
- Grey Cup champion (2025); First-team FCS All-American (2019); OVC Defensive Player of the Year (2019); 3× First-team All-OVC (2016, 2018, 2019)

Career NFL statistics
- Total tackles: 11
- Stats at Pro Football Reference
- Stats at CFL.ca

Aaron Patrick (born December 21, 1996) is an American professional football defensive lineman for the Saskatchewan Roughriders of the Canadian Football League (CFL). He played college football at Eastern Kentucky.

== College career ==
Patrick was a member of the Eastern Kentucky Colonels for five seasons. Patrick finished his collegiate career with 27.5 sacks, which are the second-most in school history.

== Professional career ==
=== Jacksonville Jaguars ===
Patrick was signed with the Jacksonville Jaguars to their practice squad on December 14, 2020. He signed a reserve/futures contract with the team on January 4, 2021. Patrick was waived on August 31, 2021, during final roster cuts but was resigned to the team's practice squad on September 9.

=== Denver Broncos ===
The Denver Broncos signed Patrick to their active roster off of the Jaguars practice squad on September 23, 2021.

In Week 6 of the 2022 season, Patrick suffered a torn ACL and was placed on injured reserve on October 21, 2022. The injury came after Patrick was forced out of bounds and collided with a league official. As he did so, his foot planted on a fabric mat used to cover broadcast cords and cables, and caused his knee to bend awkwardly. On November 17, Patrick launched a lawsuit against the NFL for "unspecified damages, including lost bonuses and future earning potential".

On August 29, 2023, Patrick was waived by the Broncos.

=== Saskatchewan Roughriders ===
On April 4, 2025, it was announced that Patrick had signed with the Saskatchewan Roughriders. He played in 16 regular season games where he recorded seven special teams tackles. He also played in both post-season games, including the team's 112th Grey Cup victory over the Montreal Alouettes.

On May 10, 2026, Patrick was moved to the retired list. However, he signed a new contract with the team on August 26, 2026.
