= WQRP =

Dayton, Ohio; United States
- Broadcast area: Dayton metropolitan area
- Frequency: 89.5 MHz

Programming
- Format: Spanish religious

Ownership
- Owner: Educational Media Foundation

History
- First air date: November 11, 1985
- Former frequencies: 88.1 MHz (1985–1998)

Technical information
- Licensing authority: FCC
- Facility ID: 15884
- Class: B1
- ERP: 6,000 watts
- HAAT: 64.0 meters
- Transmitter coordinates: 39°45′28.00″N 84°11′36.00″W

Links
- Public license information: Public file; LMS
- Website: nuevavida.com

WQRP is a radio station owned by Educational Media Foundation. The station broadcasts Christian Contemporary music. It shares time with Dayton Public Schools-operated WDPS during school hours within the curricular school year.

As Praise 89.5, it broadcast praise and worship music and has a 35-year history in Dayton, formerly owned by WQRP Family Broadcasting Incorporated.

== Brief history ==
WQRP began on November 11, 1985, as a simulcast of the former WCXL (now WDPR), when it was owned by Dayton Broadcast Workshop Inc. and operated out of a former church on West Third Street in the Drexel neighborhood of West Dayton. Originally WQRP operated at 88.1 with WCXL at 89.5. This continued before WCXL was sold and became WDPR, hence the frequencies swapped to their current FM dial positions.

It was once a southern gospel music format with local ministers airing preaching and teaching programs. One of the most notable was Soaring Higher with Pastor David Joe May (originally called Deliverance and Direction for Today), a show produced for television and radio by Carl Phillips and broadcast nationwide via syndication. It was an eight-time award-winning show. It ended in 2010 with WQRP soon becoming defunct.

WQRP switched to contemporary Christian music. After its sale to Educational Media Foundation, WQRP operated as a part of the K-LOVE radio network until November 2012, when it became an affiliate of Radio Nueva Vida.
