= Dick Faust =

American football player (1903–1955)

Profile
- Positions: Tackle, guard, end

Personal information
- Born: July 27, 1903; Marion Township, Allen County, Ohio, U.S.
- Died: April 15, 1955 (aged 51); Dayton, Ohio, U.S.
- Listed height: 5 ft 9 in (1.75 m)
- Listed weight: 178 lb (81 kg)

Career information
- High school: Steele (OH)
- College: Otterbein

Career history
- Dayton Triangles (1924, 1928–1929)

Career statistics
- Games: 14

Richard Emmet Faust (July 27, 1903 – April 15, 1955) was an American football player.

An Ohio native, Faust attended Steele High School and Otterbein College.

He also played professional football in the National Football League (NFL) as a tackle, guard, and end for the Dayton Triangles. He appeared in 14 NFL games, 10 as a starter, over the course of the 1924, 1928, and 1929 seasons.

After retiring from football, he worked as a foreman at the Frigidaire plant in Moraine, Ohio. He lived in Dayton, Ohio, for approximately the last 40 years of his life. He died in an automobile accident in 1955 at age 51.
