= Bernice I. Sumlin =

American educator (1926–2018)

- Bernice I. Sumlin, from a 1961 newspaper
- Born: Bernice Irene Sumlin; November 29, 1926; Dayton, Ohio, U.S.
- Died: January 11, 2018 (aged 91); Dayton, Ohio, U.S.
- Occupation: Educator
- Known for: International president, Alpha Kappa Alpha (1974)

Bernice Irene Sumlin (November 29, 1926 – January 11, 2018) was an American educator. She became the nineteenth international president of the Alpha Kappa Alpha sorority in 1974. She was a national vice president of the National Council of Negro Women. She was born and died in Dayton, Ohio.

== Early life ==
Bernice Irene Sumlin was born in Dayton, Ohio, the daughter of Wright R. Sumlin and Gussie Bingham Sumlin. She graduated from Dunbar High School, and from Wilberforce University in 1948, and earned a master's degree in education administration at Miami University in 1951. She became a member of Alpha Kappa Alpha in 1946, and continued working with the sorority for the rest of her life.

== Career ==
Sumlin was a teacher, guidance counselor, special education coordinator, and high school principal in the Dayton Public Schools. In 1961, she helped organize the Westwood neighborhood of Dayton against a zoning variance for a storage yard.

From 1970 until she retired in 1980, she was principal of an alternative high school for pregnant students. She was active in the African Methodist Episcopal Church, and served on the board of directors at Unity Bank.

After several regional and national leadership roles, Sumlin was elected the nineteenth international president of the Alpha Kappa Alpha sorority in 1974, and completed her term in 1978. She used her leadership position to focus the organization on literacy and education causes. In 1975, Sumlin represented the sorority at International Women's Year events in Washington, D.C., and Mexico City. In 1977, she was named one of Dayton's Top Ten Women. She later received the sorority's Woman of the Decade Award.

In 1997, Sumlin gave a presentation at the Fourth African American Summit in Harare, Zimbabwe. She was a national vice president of the National Council of Negro Women, and a fundraiser and organizer for the NAACP.

== Personal life ==
Sumlin died in 2018, aged 91 years, in a nursing home in Dayton.
