= Harry Wilhelm (American football) =

American football player and coach

Biographical details
- Born: January 14, 1900
- Education: Illinois

Coaching career (HC unless noted)
- 1922: Illinois (student assistant)
- 1924: Stivers HS (OH)
- 1925: Dayton Triangles (assistant)
- 1927: Denison

Head coaching record
- Overall: 3–5 (college)

Harry Hiram Wilhelm (born January 14, 1900) was an American football player and coach. He served as the head football coach at Denison University in Granville, Ohio for one season, in 1927, compiling a record of 3–5. Prior to that, Wilhelm served as an assistant coach for the Dayton Triangles of the National Football League (NFL) in 1925.

== Head coaching record ==
=== College ===
Year	Team	Overall	Conference	Standing	Bowl/playoffs
Denison Big Red (Ohio Athletic Conference / Buckeye Athletic Association) (1927)
1927	Denison	3–5	3–4 / 1–3	12th / 5th	
Denison:		3–5	3–4		
Total:		3–5			
