= Intelligent flight control system =

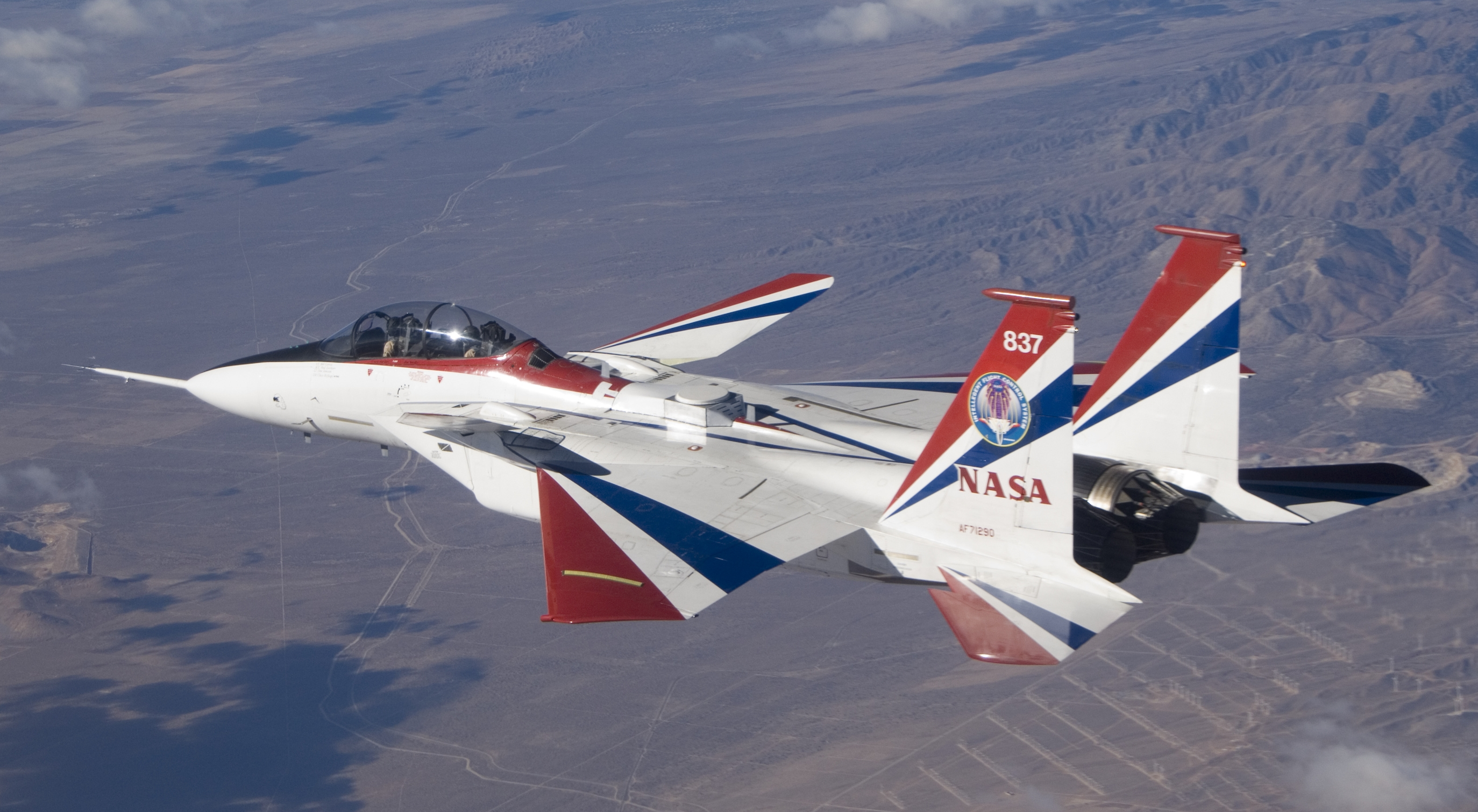
NASA's NF-15B was used for the project.

An intelligent flight control system (IFCS) is a next-generation flight control system designed to provide increased safety for the crew and passengers of aircraft as well as to optimize the aircraft performance under normal conditions. The main benefit of this system is that it will allow a pilot to control an aircraft even under failure conditions that would normally cause it to crash. The IFCS is being developed under the direction of NASA's Dryden Flight Research Center with the collaboration of the NASA's Ames Research Center, Boeing Phantom Works, the Institute for Scientific Research at West Virginia University, and the Georgia Institute of Technology.

== Objectives of IFCS ==
The main purpose of the IFCS project is to create a system for use in civilian and military aircraft that is both adaptive and fault tolerant.^{[1]} This is accomplished through the use of upgrades to the flight control software that incorporate self-learning neural network technology. The goals of the IFCS neural network project are.

1. To develop a flight control system that can identify aircraft characteristics through the use of neural network technology in order to optimize aircraft performance.
2. To develop a neural network that can train itself to analyze the flight properties of the aircraft.
3. To be able to demonstrate the aforementioned properties on a modified F-15 ACTIVE aircraft during flight, which is the testbed for the IFCS project.

== Theory of operation ==
The neural network of the IFCS learns flight characteristics in real time through the aircraft’s sensors and from error corrections from the primary flight computer, and then uses this information to create different flight characteristic models for the aircraft. The neural network only learns when the aircraft is in a stable flight condition, and will discard any characteristics that would cause the aircraft to go into a failure condition. If the aircraft's condition changes from stable to failure, for example, if one of the control surfaces becomes damaged and unresponsive, the IFCS can detect this fault and switch the flight characteristic model for the aircraft. The neural network then works to drive the error between the reference model and the actual aircraft state to zero.

== Project history ==
=== Generation 1 ===
Generation 1 IFCS flight tests were conducted in 2003 to test the outputs of the neural network.^{[1]} In this phase, the neural network was pre-trained using flight characteristics obtained for the McDonnell Douglas F-15 STOL/MTD in a wind tunnel test and did not actually provide any control adjustments in flight.^{[2]} The outputs of the neural network were run directly to instrumentation for data collection purposes only.

=== Generation 2 ===
Generation 2 IFCS tests were conducted in 2005 and used a fully integrated neural network as described in the theory of operation.^{[3]} It is a direct adaptive system that continuously provides error corrections and then measures the effects of these corrections in order to learn new flight models or adjust existing ones.^{[1]} To measure the aircraft state, the neural network takes 31 inputs from the roll, pitch, and yaw axes and the control surfaces.^{[3]} If there is a difference between the aircraft state and model, the neural network adjusts the outputs of the primary flight computer through a dynamic inversion controller to bring the difference to zero before they are sent to the actuator control electronics which move the control surfaces.

== Intelligent autopilot system ==
A different research and development project with the goal of designing an intelligent flight control system is being carried out at University College London. Their prototype is known as the intelligent autopilot system which has artificial neural networks capable of learning from human teachers by imitation. The system is capable of handling severe weather conditions and flight emergencies such as engine failure or fire, emergency landing, and performing rejected take off (RTO) in a flight simulator.^{[4]}

== See also ==
- Aircraft flight control system
- F-15
