= Pat Duffy (American football) =

American football player (1906–1965)

No. 2
- Position: Back

Personal information
- Born: December 6, 1906; Dayton, Ohio, U.S.
- Died: October 14, 1965 (aged 58); Dayton, Ohio, U.S.
- Listed height: 5 ft 10 in (1.78 m)
- Listed weight: 185 lb (84 kg)

Career information
- High school: Stivers (OH)
- College: Dayton

Career history
- Dayton Triangles (1929)

Career statistics
- Games played: 5
- Games started: 1
- Extra points made: 1
- Stats at Pro Football Reference

Joseph Patrick Duffy (December 6, 1906 – October 14, 1965) was an American football player.

A native of Dayton, Ohio, he attended Stivers High School played college football for the Dayton Flyers.

He also played professional football in the National Football League (NFL) as a back for the Dayton Triangles. He appeared in five NFL games during the 1929 season. He was the last player to ever score points for the Triangles, kicking an extra point against the Frankford Yellow Jackets, as the team was bought by the Brooklyn Dodgers after that season.

After football, he received a law degree from the University of Dayton in 1930. He became an assistant Dayton city attorney in 1937 and city prosecutor in 1942. During World War II, he served in the U.S. Navy Seabees for 27 months, participating in the Battle of Munda Point, the New Georgia campaign, and the Battle of Peleliu. After the war, he returned to his law practice with the city. He died of a heart attack in 1965 at age 58.
