= Matt Blair =

American football player (1950–2020)

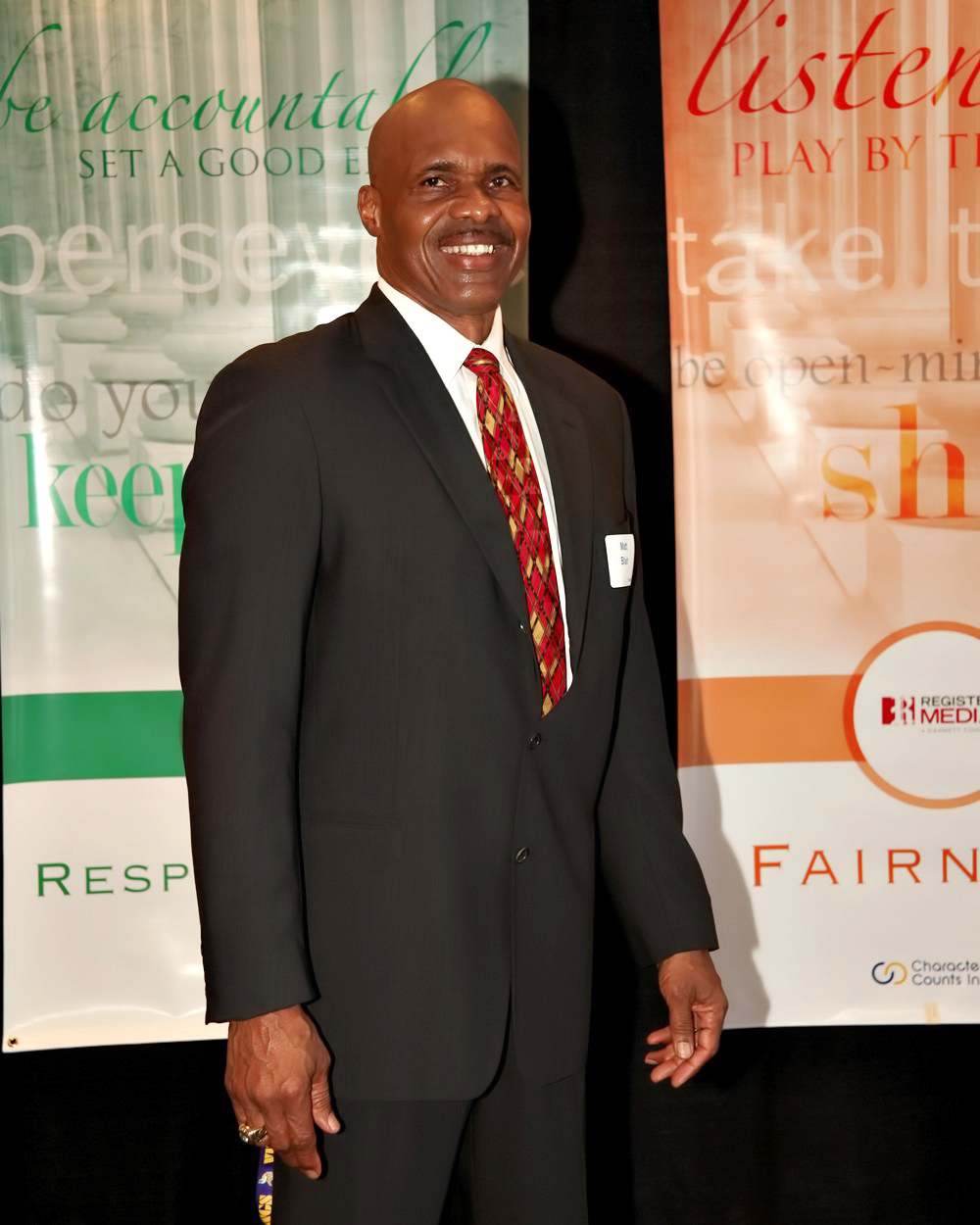
- Blair in 2014

No. 59
- Position: Linebacker

Personal information
- Born: September 20, 1950; Hilo, Hawaii, U.S.
- Died: October 22, 2020 (aged 70)
- Listed height: 6 ft 5 in (1.96 m)
- Listed weight: 232 lb (105 kg)

Career information
- High school: Colonel White (Dayton, Ohio)
- College: Northeastern Oklahoma A&M (1969–1970); Iowa State (1971–1973)
- NFL draft: 1974: 2nd round, 51st overall pick

Career history
- Minnesota Vikings (1974–1985)

Awards and highlights
- First-team All-Pro (1980); 6× Pro Bowl (1977–1982); PFWA All-Rookie Team (1974); Minnesota Vikings Ring of Honor; 50 Greatest Vikings; Minnesota Vikings 40th Anniversary Team; Minnesota Vikings 25th Anniversary Team; First-team All-American (1973); Second-team All-American (1972); 2× Second-team All-Big Eight (1971, 1973); NJCAA national champion (1969)

Career NFL statistics
- Sacks: 23
- Interceptions: 16
- Interception yards: 119
- Fumble recoveries: 20
- Total touchdowns: 2
- Stats at Pro Football Reference

Matthew Albert Blair (September 20, 1950 – October 22, 2020) was an American professional football linebacker who played for the Minnesota Vikings of the National Football League (NFL) for all 12 seasons of his career from 1974 to 1985. He played college football for the Northeastern Oklahoma A&M Golden Norsemen and the Iowa State Cyclones.

== Early life ==
Blair was born in Hilo, Hawaii, but his family moved to Ohio when he was in high school. He was recruited by Cincinnati but his academics were not up to standard so he enrolled at Northeast Oklahoma Junior College.

== College career ==
Blair walked onto the Northeastern Oklahoma A&M football team and was a member of the 1969 Junior College Championship squad. He was able to earn a half scholarship through football but had to join the basketball team to receive his other half scholarship. Blair was recruited by Florida, Florida State, Alabama, and Iowa State, among others. After a visit by Johnny Majors, Blair ultimately committed to Iowa State.

While at Iowa State, Blair was a two time letter winner. He was a member of ISU's 1971 Sun Bowl team and was named the bowl's most outstanding defensive player despite ISU's loss. After sitting out the 1972 season with a knee injury, he rebounded with an outstanding senior campaign in 1973. Blair earned All-America honors, tallying 77 tackles, one interception and three fumble recoveries. He was invited to play in the Hula Bowl, East-West Shrine Game, and the Senior Bowl.

== Professional career ==
=== Minnesota Vikings ===
Blair was a selected by the Minnesota Vikings in the second round of the 1974 NFL draft with the 51st overall selection. Blair quickly established himself as one of the top and speediest linebackers in the NFC, earning Pro Bowl honors for 6 consecutive seasons (1977–1982) and making the NFL All-Rookie Team. In addition, Blair was selected All-Pro in 1980, All-NFC in 1978 and Second-team All-NFC in 1977, 1979 and 1981. He was also an exceptional special teams player, particularly in blocking punts because of his great speed and timing abilities. Blair is third in NFL history with 20 blocked kicks.

Blair appeared in two Super Bowls with the Vikings, Super Bowl IX (1974 season) and Super Bowl XI (1976 season), and both were losses respectively to the Pittsburgh Steelers and the Oakland Raiders.

Blair started for the Vikings his rookie season replacing the injured Roy Winston. Blair participated in special teams play in Super Bowl IX, blocking Bobby Walden's punt, recovered by Terry Brown in the endzone, the Vikings' only points all day, as they missed the extra point. He was a vital part of the 1976 Minnesota Vikings season in which the team compiled a record 11–2–1 and was second in the NFL in fewest points allowed (176 points, 12.6 points per game). Blair recovered five fumbles and intercepted two passes from his linebacker position with Jeff Siemon in the middle and Wally Hilgenberg on the opposite side. The Vikings defeated the Rams again in the NFC championship game of the 1976–77 NFL playoffs, when Blair recovered two fumbles.

In 2022, the Professional Football Researchers Association named Blair to the PFRA Hall of Very Good Class of 2022.

== Death ==
In a 2015 interview, Blair revealed that he had been showing early signs of dementia. He said that he was told by his neurologist that the symptoms were likely the result of chronic traumatic encephalopathy (CTE), a degenerative brain disease linked to concussions.

Blair died on October 22, 2020, at the age of 70. His cause of death was not immediately announced, but Blair had been dealing with complications from dementia in recent years.
