= Dayton City League =

The Dayton City League is an OHSAA-sponsored athletic league that is entirely made up of schools located within Dayton, Ohio that are part of Dayton Public Schools.

The league did not exist from 2002-2007 when the schools remaining after several closures and consolidations joined the Southwest Ohio Public League. Beginning in 2015 and for football only, all five football-playing schools will rejoin the SOPL.

== Members ==
School	Nickname	Colors	Address	Type	Tenure as a H.S.
Belmont High School	Bison	Red, Columbia Blue	2615 Wayne Ave. Dayton, OH 45420	Public, 7-12	1959-
Dunbar High School	Wolverines	Blue, White	1400 Albritton Dr. Dayton, OH 45408	Public, 9-12	1931-
Thurgood Marshall High School	Cougars	Purple, Gold	4447 Hoover Ave. Dayton, OH 45417	Public, 9-12	2007-
Meadowdale High School	Lions	Black, Gold	3873 Whitestone Ct. Dayton, OH 45416	Public, 9-12	1961-
Ponitz Career Technology Center	Golden Panthers	Blue, Gold	741 Washington St. Dayton, OH 45402	Technical School, 9-12	2009-
Stivers School for the Arts	Tigers	Orange, Black	1313 E. 5th St. Dayton, OH 45402	Magnet School, 7-12	1908-1976, 1999-

== Former members ==
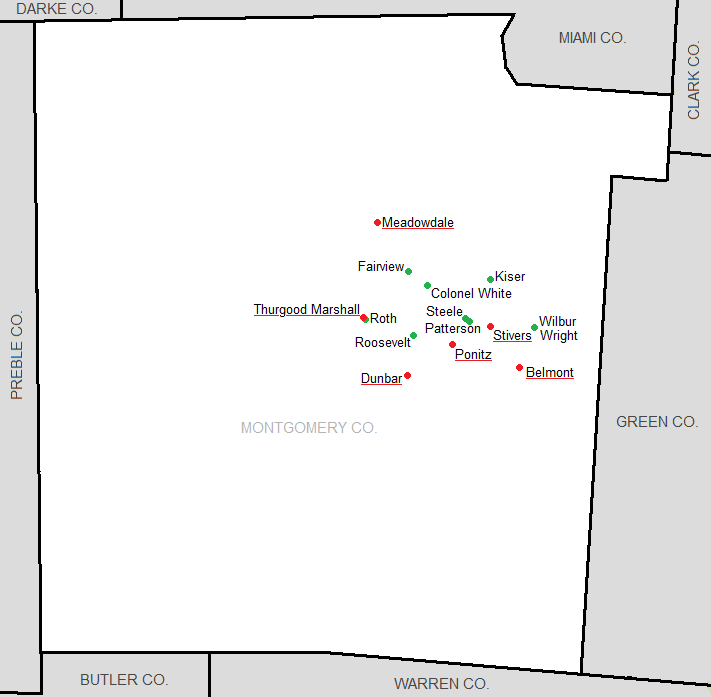
The all-time members of the Dayton City League. Current members are in red, former members are in green.

School	Nickname	Colors	Address	Type	Tenure as a H.S.
Colonel White High School	Cougars	Green, Gold	501 Niagara Ave. Dayton, OH 45405	Public	1929-2007
Fairview High School	Bulldogs	Blue, Gold	1305 W. Fairview Ave. Dayton, OH 45406	Public	1929-1982
Kiser High School	Panthers	Blue, Gold	1401 Leo St. Dayton, OH 45404	Public	1925-1982
Patterson Career Center/ Patterson Co-Op/ Stivers-Patterson	Beavers	Crimson, Gray	118 E. 1st St. Dayton, OH 45402	Public	1952-2009
Roosevelt High School	Teddies	Red, White	2013 W. 3rd St. Dayton, OH 45417	Public	1923-1975
Roth High School	Falcons	Purple, White	4535 Hoover Ave. Dayton, OH 45417	Public	1959-1982
Steele High School	Lions	Red, Black	203 N. Main St. Dayton, OH 45402	Public	1906-1940
Wilbur Wright High School	Pilots	Red, Black	1361 Huffman Ave. Dayton, OH 45403	Public	1940-1982

== Links ==
- Dayton Public Schools
- Dayton Public Schools Athletic Website
