= Steve Buchanan =

American football player (1903–1992)

Profile
- Position: Back

Personal information
- Born: March 4, 1903; Wolfe County, Kentucky, U.S.
- Died: November 21, 1992 (aged 89); Dayton, Ohio, U.S.
- Listed height: 6 ft 0 in (1.83 m)
- Listed weight: 191 lb (87 kg)

Career information
- High school: Steele (OH)
- College: Miami (OH)

Career history
- Dayton Triangles (1929)

Career statistics
- Games: 9

Stephen Thomas Buchanan (March 4, 1903 – November 21, 1992) was an American football player.

A Kentucky native, Buchanan attended Steele High School in Dayton, Ohio where he starred in sports like football, basketball, and baseball. He played college football at Miami University and professional football in the National Football League (NFL) as a back for the Dayton Triangles. He appeared in nine NFL games during the 1929 season. He died in 1992 at age 89.
