= Bill Hosket =

Bill Hosket may refer to:

- Bill Hosket Sr. (1911–1956), basketball player
- Bill Hosket Jr. (born 1946), basketball player
