= Marj Heyduck =

American journalist (1913–1969)

- "The Woman in the Hat"
- Born: Marjorie Irene Evers; June 24, 1913; Dayton, Ohio
- Died: September 15, 1969 (aged 56)
- Resting place: Woodland Cemetery and Arboretum
- Education: Ohio State University
- Occupations: Columnist, journalist
- Writing career
- Years active: 1936–1969

Marjorie Irene Evers "Marj" Heyduck (1913–1969) was a reporter, columnist and editor for the Dayton Herald, Dayton Press, Dayton Journal, Dayton Journal-Herald, and Dayton Daily News from 1936 to 1969. She also hosted a radio show from 1939 to 1941.

== Early life and education ==
Heyduck was born in Dayton, Ohio, in 1913 to Robert C. Evers and Helen M. Rhoads, one of three children. She graduated from Stivers High School in 1931, and from Ohio State University with a degree in journalism.

== Columnist ==
Heyduck's columns, published under the title "Third and Main," between 1943 and 1969, were "the most popular" of the paper's morning columns and were collected into three books. The Dayton Daily News said, "[s]he moved up the ranks at the Journal Herald quickly, but it was her popular column and interesting hats that brought her fame." Roz Young, who succeeded her, called her "a celebrity. 'Look,' people said in reverent tones ... That's Marj Heyduck.'"

She wrote a feature column on wrestling for the Dayton Herald's sports department in the 1940s, and was friends with Gorgeous George, whom she took to her hairdresser to have his famous blond locks restyled. Her columns occasionally covered the elegant "Tea with Marj" events held throughout the area to which she invited "lady wrestlers."

Her career started in 1936 in the women's page department at the Dayton Herald. She moved to the weekly Dayton Press, returned to the Dayton Herald in 1943 as a general assignment reporter, and started her popular column there in 1944. She was named editor of the women's department at the Herald in 1948. When the Dayton Journal and the Dayton Herald merged in 1949, she was named women's editor of the Journal Herald. In 1966, she became assistant to the editor of the newspaper, then Glenn Thompson, and editorship of the women's page was taken over by Virginia Hunt.

== Impact ==
Heyduck was "famous" for being "The Woman in the Hat." Her daily column dingbat featured a photograph of her in a different hat every day; every month she "hauled in 25 new hats to be photographed in" for the next month's columns, leaving the daily's photographers "fearing for their sanity," for a total of 2,776 hats and photographs over the course of her career. The Dayton Daily News called her "legendary".

She was "one of the early advocates" for redevelopment of the Dayton Arcade, writing in a 1967 column, "How can we get shoppers to the heart of Dayton every day? Restore the arcade to its rightful elegance." In 1980, the newly refurbished arcade named their new vendor pushcarts after her.

Heyduck also had a daily radio show on WING from 1939 to 1941, and was a motivational speaker.

Heyduck's obituary was read into the Congressional Record by Representative Charles Whalen.

== Personal life ==
She married Emerson C. Heyduck, an insurance agent, in 1934 and was widowed in 1953. They had no children.

== Awards and honors ==
Heyduck won over 75 journalism awards over her career, earning her a national reputation.

- National Headliners Award (1946)
- United Press International Best Column in Ohio (1963)
- Penney-Missouri Award for Excellence, Women's Pages (1964)

She regularly led discussions at seminars for women's page editors, appearing at Columbia University's American Press Institute 23 times between 1952 and 1968, and at state press associations in California, Tennessee, and Pennsylvania.

== Bibliography ==
- The Best of Marj (1962)
- The Anniversary Marj (1964)
- The Third Marj (1966)
