= Bobby Martin (American football) =

American football player (1987–2020)

Bobby Martin (Robert Martin Jr)
Personal information
- Nationality: American
- Born: November 3, 1987 Dayton, Ohio
- Died: April 28, 2020 (aged 32) Dayton, Ohio
- Resting place: West Memory Gardens, Moraine, Ohio
- Height: 3 ft (0.91 m)
- Weight: 110 lb (50 kg)

Sport
- Sport: American football
- Disability: Caudal regression syndrome

Bobby Martin (November 3, 1987 – April 28, 2020) nicknamed "Bobby No Legs”, was born with Caudal regression syndrome. As he had no legs or hips, he used his arms to run. A graduate of Colonel White High School in Dayton, Ohio, he played defensive lineman for his high school varsity team. He later attended Central State University.

== Biography ==
Martin was 3 feet (0.91 m) tall and weighed 110 pounds (50 kg) as he was born with a significant form of Caudal regression syndrome which resulted in being born without hips or legs. During his 2005 high school senior season, he was removed from play at half-time in a game against Mount Healthy High School by officials claiming he was in breach of league rules requiring players to wear thigh pads, knee pads and shoes. Colonel White High School was later told by the Ohio High School Athletic Association that this decision was incorrect and Martin was allowed to continue to finish the season. He finished the season with 48 tackles. At halftime of one game, he was named the Homecoming King. On July 12, 2006, Martin won the ESPY award for Best Male Athlete with a Disability.

After graduation, Martin studied marketing at Central State University and did not play football. In 2007, then Cleveland Browns head coach Romeo Crennel invited Martin to a practice. After seeing wide receiver Dennis Northcutt evade player after player, Martin approached Northcutt and claimed that he could tackle him. At the insistence of teammate Braylon Edwards, Northcutt allowed Martin to challenge him. During the run, Martin hung with Northcutt for 20 yards before forcing him out at the one-yard line.

After Martin's playing days, he had several run ins with police for various crimes. On April 28, 2020, Martin died when he crashed an ATV he had stolen earlier that evening.
