= Margaret Andrew =

American experimental engineer

Margaret J Andrew
- Born: March 2, 1908; Dayton, OH
- Died: September 5, 2000 (aged 92); Oakwood, OH
- Education: The Ohio State University

Margaret J. Andrew (March 2, 1908 – September 5, 2000) was an American experimental engineer. Born in Dayton, Ohio, she had a focus in science and technology. Her work as an experimental engineer lead to two patents for improving dishwashing and clothes washing appliances. In addition to her professional endeavors, Margaret had a passion for fine cooking and cuisine.

== Family ==
Margaret was the daughter of James E. and Mary L. (Darst) Andrew. She had two brothers, Herbert and Ralph Andrew and two sisters, Alma Gerhard and Emma Caroline Heath.

== Education ==
Andrew graduated from Steele High School, which was in Dayton, Ohio. Upon her graduation, she began her collegiate career at The Ohio State University. Andrew was an active member of the OSU chapter of the Sigma Kappa sorority. She was the first woman to earn a Bachelor of Science degree in Banking and Finance from OSU.

== Career ==
Andrew joined General Motors in the Frigidaire division, and worked within the customer research department for 17 years. This position allowed her to reach consumers by going door to door to hear how they were utilizing the products and the insights that she gained from these conversations were used to create adjustments to the top rack inside of a dishwasher. The original design only allowed for 12 glasses; Andrew determined that she could modify the rack to hold 26 glasses. Her work as an experimental engineer resulted in two different patents, both issued in her name. On September 26, 1957, Andrew filed a patent for a "Dish Rack for Domestic Appliance", which was granted and published on October 27, 1959. Her other patent benefited the process of washing clothes, helping improve the agitation control of the washing machine. Andrew retired from Frigidaire after working for 37 years.

== Publications ==
Andrew became a published author in 1983 with the book Home Food Care. The book's focus was on a method of food preparation that involved cooking, sealing and freezing items.

== Affiliations ==
Andrew was a member of Westminster Presbyterian Church. In 2003, the church, in partnership with Sinclair College, created a scholarship in her name, the "Margaret J. Andrew Memorial Scholarship for Culinary Students". Westminster Presbyterian Church wanted to help facilitate Andrew's goal of financially assisting and supporting those wishing to obtain careers in the field of Culinary Arts. Andrew was also a member of the American Association of University Women, a life member, Dayton OSU Alumni Club, Dayton Music Club, Dayton Federation of Women Club, and the Dayton Women's Club.

== Awards ==
In 1986, Andrew was inducted into the Ohio Women's Hall of Fame, an honor for "significant contributions to the social, economic, political and cultural growth" within the state and the country. She was also the first woman to be elected President of the Ohio Valley Section of Food Technologists.
