= Saint Anne's Hill Historic District =

Historic district in Ohio, United States

- U.S. National Register of Historic Places
- U.S. Historic district
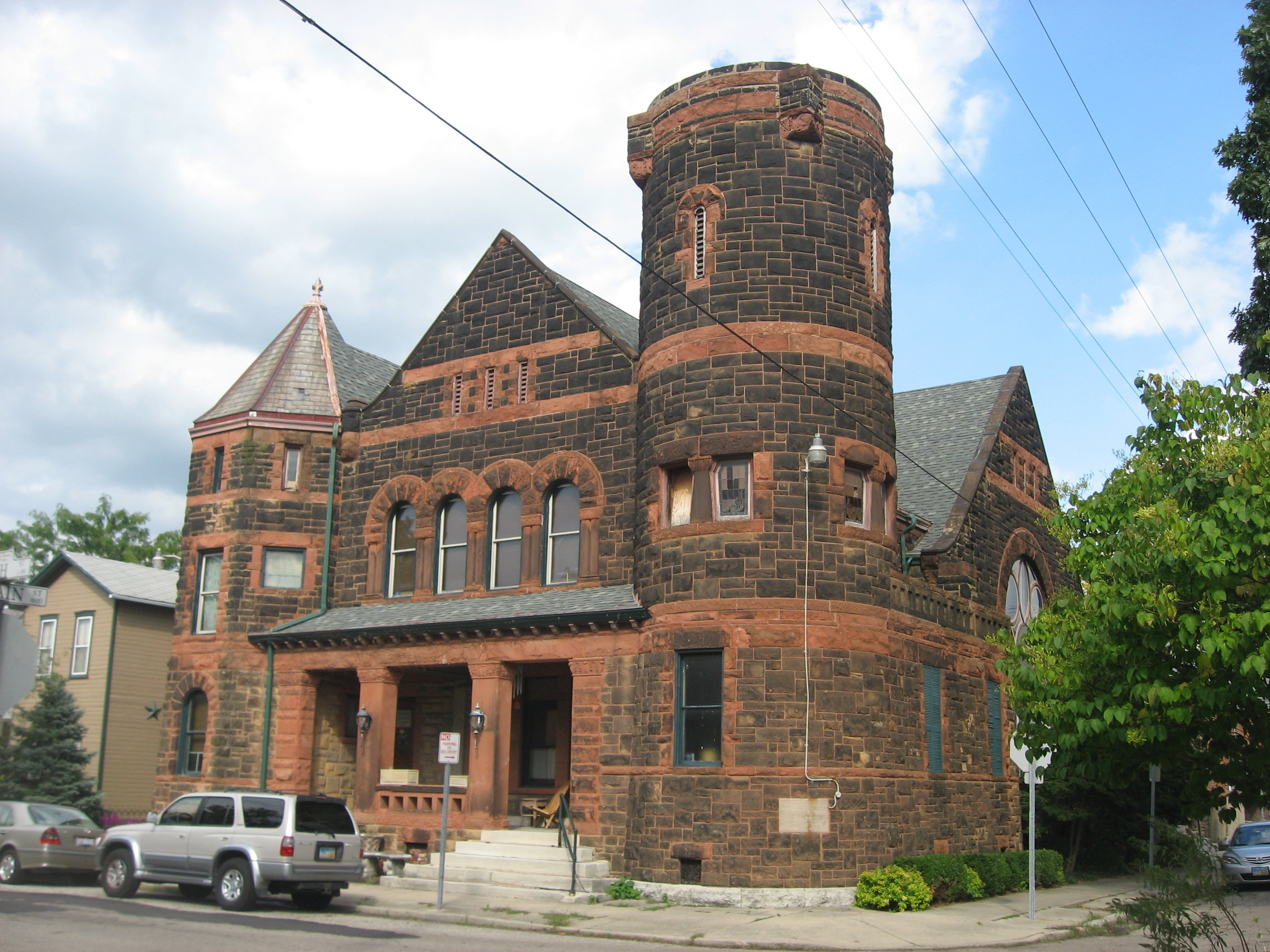
- A church in the district

- Location within Ohio Location within the United States
- Location: Roughly bounded by Fourth, McClure, Josie, and High and Dutoit Sts., Dayton, Ohio
- Coordinates: 39°45′24″N 84°10′23″W
- Built: 1860
- Architectural style: Second Empire, Queen Anne, Romanesque
- NRHP reference No.: 86001214
- Added to NRHP: June 5, 1986

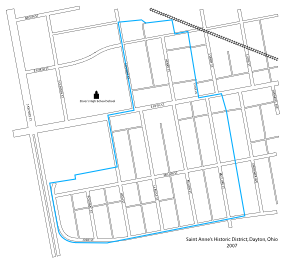
Map of the boundaries of St. Anne's Hill Historic District

Saint Anne's Hill Historic District is part of the Historic Inner East neighborhood in Dayton, Ohio, United States. St. Anne's Hill comprises a grouping of both vernacular and high-style Victorian residences that date roughly from 1860 to the early 20th century. Having originally been platted in 1802 by German immigrants, the neighborhood is significant for its German heritage Dayton Liederkranz Turner German club. Stivers School for the Arts, a nationally ranked public high school, is also located within St. Anne's Hill.

== Historic District ==
The area was first recognized by the city as a local historical neighborhood in 1974, via the City of Dayton Ordinance #24688. St. Anne's Hill was registered on the National Register of Historic Places (No. 86001214) in 1986. The designated area is bounded by Fourth, McClure, Josie, and High and Dutoit Streets. The historic district consists of roughly 14 blocks, containing 333 properties as of 2014.

== Architecture ==
The architecture of St. Anne's Hill Historic District includes examples of the Second Empire, Romanesque and Queen Anne eras. Notable buildings include The Steamboat House at 6 Josie Street and the Bossler Mansion (built in 1869) at 136 S. Dutoit Street. Every other year, the neighborhood runs tours of the historic homes, with guides in Victorian costumes, to raise funds for the local historic society.

== Parks ==
Bomberger Park is a notable feature of St. Anne's Hill. During the Great Dayton Flood of 1913, boats were docked in Bomberger Park with evacuees. In the 1930s, the park featured a notable wading pool with a colonnade, though none of these structures now exist. The park now contains tennis and basketball courts, a baseball diamond, a soccer field, and a playground. In 2012, the City of Dayton sold the adjacent Bomberger Center (constructed in 1956) to the Ahiska Turkish American Community Center of Dayton.

There are also several other parks inside the district, including Fred's Park, Alice's Park, Terry Street Park, and Victorian Park.

== Businesses ==
Since 2013, St. Anne's Hill has seen an increasing number of small businesses opening on 5th Street. Fifth Street Brewpub, a co-op pub, opened in 2013 and is credited with establishing the area as a viable business destination. Gem City Catfé, a cat café with coffee, wine, and adoptable cats, opened in January 2018. More than a decade later, the East Fifth Street and East Third Street corridors that run through and border the neighborhood are now filled with dozens of new food, dining, shopping, and event spaces.

== See also ==
- National Register of Historic Places listings in Dayton, Ohio
