= Trudy Krisher =

American author and educator

Trudy Krisher (born 1946) is an American author of young adult novels, children's books, a college textbook, and a scholarly biography. She is a former professor of liberal arts in Dayton, Ohio.

== Early life and education ==
Krisher was born in Macon, Georgia. Her parents were Whitley Herron Butner and Lois Drane Butner. She graduated from The College of William and Mary in 1968 and received a master's in education from Trenton State College in 1972.

== Career ==
Krisher has written young adult novels, children’s picture books, a college textbook, and a scholarly biography.

From 2001 until her retirement Krisher was a professor in the Department of Liberal Arts, Communication, and Social Sciences at Sinclair Community College. She was an assistant professor at University of Dayton from 1985 to 2001.

'Spite Fences'(1994)'Kinship (1997), Uncommon Faith (2003), Fallout (2006), and Bark Park (2018) were reviewed by Kirkus. 'Spite Fences' was reviewed by Publishers Weekly and School Library Journal. 'Uncommon Faith was reviewed by Publishers Weekly.

== Awards and honors ==
- 1994 Cuffie Award for Most Promising New Author, Publishers Weekly
- 1994 Miami Valley Cultural Alliance Arts Award
- 1994 Honor Book selection, Parents' Choice, and Best Book for Young Adults selection, American Library Association
- 1995 Best Young Adult Novel award, International Reading Association
- 1995 Jefferson Cup Honor Book, Virginia Library Association
- 1995 New York Public Library Award
- 1997 Best Books Award, American Library Association
- 1997 New York Library Award
- 1999 Tennessee Volunteer State Book Award, Tennessee Association of School Librarians
- 2004 Best Books Award, American Library Association
- 2004 Best Children's Book of the Year, Bank Street College of Education
- 2004 Amelia Bloomer Project honors, City of Austin Youth Services
- 2004 Culture Works Artists' fellowship
- 2015 Silver Medal, Independent Publishers Association
- 2018 Ohioana Award for BARK PARK (Simon & Schuster/Beach Lane Books)
- 2018 Angie Karcher Best-in-Rhyme Award

== Bibliography ==
- Kathy's Hats: A Story of Hope (1992)
- Spite Fences (1994)
- Writing for a Reader: Peers, Process, and Progress in the Writing Classroom (1994)
- Kinship (1997)
- Uncommon Faith (2003)
- Fallout (2006)
- Fanny Seward: a Life
- An Affectionate Farewell: Old Bob and Old Abe (2015)
- Bark Park (2018)
- ON THE MARCH: A NOVEL OF THE WOMEN'S MARCH ON WASHINGTON; The Social Justice Press, 2022.

== Personal life ==
Krisher has three children. She is a Unitarian and a Democrat. She lives in Columbus, Ohio.
