= Frances Smith Foster =

American researcher and academic (born 1944)

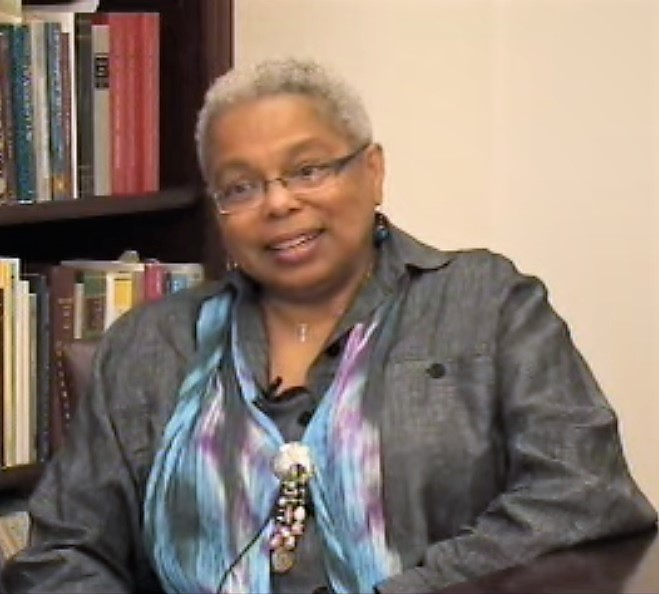
- Foster interviewed at Emory School of Law in 2012
- Born: February 8, 1944 (age 82)
- Children: 3

Academic background
- Education: University of California, San Diego; University of Southern California; Miami University
- Thesis: Slave narratives : text and social context (1976)

Frances Smith Foster (born 1944) is an American researcher and emeritus Professor of African-American studies and women's history. She has previously served as the Charles Howard Candler Professor of English and Women's Studies at Emory University.

== Early life and education ==
Foster grew up in Dayton, Ohio. Her parents were Quinton Smith, one of the 2 first Black bus drivers in the city and Mabel Smith (née Gullette), a beautician. Frances is the oldest of their five children. Smith attended the all-black Wogaman Elementary School and graduated from Roosevelt High School.

She earned her bachelor's degree at Miami University, where she studied education. She made Phi Beta Kappa and graduated cum laude. She earned a master's degree in British and American literature at the University of Southern California in 1971. After graduating Foster moved to the University of California, San Diego, where she investigated slave narratives as part of a doctoral programme in British and American literature. She has said that during her graduate studies in the 1970s she did not encounter the work of Black women scholars. She received her Ph.D. there in 1976.

== Research and career ==
In the early days of her academic career, Foster was appointed as the Chair of Black Students at San Diego State University. In 1994, she published Witnessing Slavery: The Development of Antebellum Slave Narratives, which was the first text to explore the genre of slave literature. She has argued that African-American literature owes a considerable amount to slave narratives; including humour, irony and the creation of the protagonist character of "The Heroic Slave". The Modern Language Association has said: "Frances proved that the slave narrative was a dynamic and ever-evolving genre of black self-expression." She also studied the literary contributions of African-American women, arguing that Black women not only founded the literary traditions of African Americans but that of all American women's literature. When Foster joined Emory University in 1996, she became Director of the Institute for Women's Studies. She contributed to the 1997 Norton Anthology of African American Literature. She held Fellowships at Harvard University and Leiden University.

Foster served on various committees for the Modern Language Association, including the Division of Ethnic Languages and Literatures, Afro-American Literature Discussion Group and executive committee.

== Awards and honors ==
In 2009, Foster was awarded the Francis Andrew March award and in 2010 the Hubbell Medal, both of the Modern Language Association. She was the first African-American woman to win such an award.

In 2011, she was awarded the Brandeis University Toby Gittler Prize "for outstanding and lasting contributions to racial, ethnic and religious relations", and the Emory University Feminists Founders award. The following year, the Society for the Study of American Women Writers announced that Foster was the inaugural winner of the Karen Dandurand Lifetime Achievement Medal.

== Selected works ==
- Foster, Frances Smith (1944– ). (1994). Witnessing slavery : the development of ante-bellum slave narratives. The University of Wisconsin Press. ISBN 978-0-299-14214-8. OCLC 985816329.
- Foster, Frances Smith. (1993). Written by herself literary production by African American women, 1746-1892. Indiana University Press. ISBN 0-253-20786-X. OCLC 1178676105.
- Andrews, William L.; Frances Smith Foster; Trudier Harris, eds. (1997). The Oxford Companion to African American Literature. Oxford University Press. ISBN 0-19-506510-7. OCLC 35305158.
