= Colonel White High School =

Location
- 501 Niagara Ave. Dayton, Ohio 45405; United States
- Coordinates: 39°46′49″N 84°13′07″W

Information
- School type: Public Secondary School
- Founded: 1929
- Closed: 2008
- School board: Dayton Public Schools
- Grades: 9–12
- Language: English
- Area: Urban
- Colors: Green and Gold
- Athletics conference: Dayton City League
- Mascot: Cougar
- Newspaper: Cougar Den

Colonel White High School was built in 1929 in Dayton Ohio. It stood on the corner of Wabash and Niagara in Upper Dayton View until it was demolished in 2008.

Colonel White was named for Colonel William Jeremiah White, an officer who fought in the Spanish–American War. It was named for White because he had been superintendent of Dayton Schools in 1888 and lived in Lower Dayton View.

Initially, Colonel White school was a junior high school. An auditorium, east wing, and south wing were added during the 1950s and 1960s as the school became a high school. Briefly, students attended Colonel White for their first two years, and then would attend Fairview High School for Junior and Senior years.

In 1957, Jack A. DeVelbiss (1927–1988) became the music director of Colonel White High School. DeVelbiss is responsible for creating the "Little Colonels," a drill team famous for precision military-style marching. He also created a range of music programs and directed several musicals in the newly-built auditorium. This began Colonel White's legacy as an award-winning music and theatre school.

As the demographics of Dayton View shifted, the high school was the cite of racial unrest. Rioting erupted in cities across America. A riot broke out in West Dayton when white men in a car shot Lester Mitchell at 3 am on September 1, 1966. Dayton View was a neighborhood that was open to Black residents. It had a large Jewish Community and was home to three Synagogues at the time. It was also home to Appalachian migrants and southern and eastern European immigrant communities. By the time Dayton Public Schools were ordered to desegregate, Colonel White was already racially balanced and was exempt from busing.

In 1983, the name of the school was changed to The Colonel White High School for the Performing Arts.

The land it stood on was eventually sold to Frederick Holley for $4,290.

== Notable alumni ==
- Howard Bayne – former ABA power forward (Kentucky Colonels)
- Matt Blair – former NFL linebacker (Minnesota Vikings)
- Doug France – former NFL offensive tackle (Los Angeles Rams)
- Bobby Martin – former high school defensive lineman, born without hips or legs
- Rebecca Wanzo – academic specializing in African-American literature and culture
- Bakari Lumumba – academic specializing in Black Cultural Centers and Black student development
