= Taliaferro Sebastian =

- Born: 1987 (age 38–39); United States
- Occupation: Visual artist
- Website: arthasnorules.com

"Killmonger Hussle," by Taliaferro Sebastian

Taliaferro Sebastian (born 1987) is an American visual artist and painter from Dayton, Ohio known for his portraits and representations of Black culture. Sebastian has exhibited work across the United States, including at the Cincinnati Art Museum and Black Palette Art Gallery.

Sebastian studied graphic arts at Central State University, earning a bachelor's degree. His work, which often utilizes acrylic and spray paint, shows his influences of artists such as Ernie Barnes, Jean-Michel Basquiat and Kaws. Sebastian is the owner of Art Has No Rules gallery in Dayton, Ohio, where he lives and works.
