= Dick Dobeleit =

American football player (1903–1978)

- Dick Dobeleit, 1923

Profile
- Position: Fullback

Personal information
- Born: July 4, 1903; Tilsit, East Prussia, German Empire (now Sovetsk, Kaliningrad Oblast, Russia)
- Died: March 2, 1978 (aged 74); Lake Wales, Florida, U.S.
- Listed height: 5 ft 4 in (1.63 m)
- Listed weight: 155 lb (70 kg)

Career information
- High school: Steele (OH)
- College: Ohio State

Career history
- Dayton Triangles (1925–1926)

Richard Frank Dobeleit (July 4, 1903 – March 2, 1978) was an American football player.

Dobeleit was born in Tilsit (then part of Germany, now part of Russia) in 1903. He attended Steele High School in Dayton, Ohio, playing at the fullback position for the football team from 1919 to 1921. During Dobeleit's time with the team, it suffered only two losses and claimed a national championship.

He then attended Ohio State University. He played fullback for the 1923 Ohio State Buckeyes football team. He then transferred to Kirksville Osteopathy College to study osteopathic medicine.

He played professional football in the National Football League (NFL) for the Dayton Triangles in 1925 and 1926. He appeared in 12 NFL games.

Dobeleit later practiced medicine in Dayton and helped establish Dayton's Grandview Hospital. His son, Bill Dobeleit, was also a star athlete who was killed in action while serving on the flight deck of an aircraft carrier in the Pacific Theater during World War II.

He moved to Florida in approximately 1971. He died in Lake Wales, Florida, in 1978.
