= Dayton Public Schools =

School district in Ohio, U.S.

Coordinates: 39°45′N 84°12′W

Address
- 136 S. Ludlow Street; Dayton, Ohio 45402 Montgomery County, Ohio, 45402; United States

District information
- Type: Public
- Grades: PreK-12
- Established: December 1831
- Superintendent: Dr. David Lawrence, Ph.D
- Asst. superintendent(s): Lisa Minor
- School board: 7 members
- Chair of the board: William Smith
- Schools: 30
- Budget: $248.4 m (2018)
- Affiliation: The Ohio 8

Students and staff
- Students: 12571
- Faculty: 2062 full-time employees (2018)

Other information
- Treasurer: Hiwot Abraha
- Website: www.dps.k12.oh.us

Dayton Public Schools is the school district in the U.S. state of Ohio that serves Dayton, Ohio. The district covers 49 square miles. Dayton Public Schools (DPS) is the 12th largest PreK-12 district in the state, with a 2017–2018 enrollment of about 12571. DPS has 27 schools, 17 elementary schools, 3 stand-alone middle schools, and 7 high schools..

DPS operates the FM jazz radio station WDPS.

== Schools ==
=== High schools (9-12 & 7-12) ===
School	Address	Type	Tenure as a H.S.
Belmont High School	2615 Wayne Ave.	Public, 7-12	1959-
Paul Laurence Dunbar High School	1400 Albritton Dr.	Public, 9-12	1931-
Thurgood Marshall STEM High School	4447 Hoover Ave.	Public, 9-12	2007-
Meadowdale Career Technology Center	3873 Whitestone Ct.	Public, 9-12	1961-
Mound Street Academy	354 Mound St.	9-12	
David H. Ponitz Career Technology Center	741 Washington St.	Tech. School, 9-12	2009-
Stivers School for the Arts	1313 E. 5th St.	Magnet School, 7-12	1908-1976, 1997-

=== Elementary and middle schools ===
- Belle Haven Pre-K-6 School
- Charity Adams Earley Girls Academy Pre-K-8
- Cleveland Elementary Pre-K-6 School
- Eastmont Elementary Pre-K-6 School
- Edison Elementary Pre-K-6 School
- Edwin Joel Brown Middle School
- Fairview Elementary Pre-K-6 School
- Horace Mann Elementary Pre-K-6 School
- International School at Residence Park for English Learner Students K-12
- Kemp Elementary Pre-K-6 School
- Kiser Elementary Pre-K-6 School – At the site of the former Kiser High School
- Louise Troy Elementary Pre-K-6 School
- River's Edge Montessori Pre-K-6 School
- Roosevelt Elementary Pre-K-6 School
- Rosa Parks Early Learning Center Pre-K
- Ruskin Elementary Pre-K-6 School
- Valerie Elementary Pre-K-6 School
- Westwood Elementary Pre-K-6 School
- Wogaman Middle School
- Wright Brothers Middle School

=== K-12 ===
- The International School At Residence Park

== Former school buildings ==
The following schools have been closed and, in some cases, demolished.

=== High schools ===
School	Address	Type	Tenure as a H.S.
Colonel White High School	501 Niagara Ave.	Public	1929-2007
Fairview High School	1305 W. Fairview Ave.	Public	1929-1982
Kiser High School	1401 Leo St.	Public	1925-1982
Patterson Career Center/ Patterson Co-Op/ Stivers-Patterson	118 E. 1st St.	Public	1952-2009
Roosevelt High School	2013 W. 3rd St.	Public	1923-1975
Roth High School	4535 Hoover Ave.	Public	1959-1982
Steele High School	203 N. Main St.	Public	1906-1940
Wilbur Wright High School	1361 Huffman Ave.	Public	1940-1982

=== Elementary schools ===
- Allen Elementary School
- Belmont Elementary School
- Carlson Elementary School
- Central Elementary School
- Clark Occupational
- Cornell Heights Elementary School
- Drexel Elementary School
- Emerson Elementary School
- Fairport Elementary School
- Fort McKinley Elementary School
- Franklin Montessori School
- Gardendale Elementary School
- Garfield Elementary School
- Gettysburg Elementary School
- Grace A. Greene Elementary School (housed 1997-2004 at Fairview)
- Hawthorne Elementary School
- Hickorydale Elementary School
- Highview Elementary School
- Huffman Elementary School
- Irving Elementary School
- Jackson Elementary School
- Jackson Primary School
- Jane Addams Elementary School
- Jefferson Elementary School
- Lewton Elementary School
- Lincoln Elementary School
- Longfellow Elementary School
- Loos Elementary School
- MacFarlane Elementary School
- McGuffey Elementary School
- McKinley Occupational
- McNary Park Elementary School
- Miami Chapel Elementary School
- Orville Wright Elementary School
- Patterson Kennedy Elementary School
- Residence Park Elementary School
- Shiloh Elementary School
- Shoup Mill Elementary School
- U. S. Grant Elementary School
- Van Cleve Elementary School
- Washington Elementary School
- Weaver Elementary School
- Webster Elementary School
- Westwood Elementary School
- Whittier Elementary School
- Willard Elementary School

== Notable alumni (Closed high schools) ==
=== Steele High School ===
- Margaret Andrew – former experimental engineer, Frigidaire
- Johnnie Becker – former NFL lineman and back, Dayton Triangles
- Earl "Red" Blaik – hall of fame college football head coach, United States Military Academy
- Steve Buchanan – former NFL back, Dayton Triangles
- Richard E. Cole – former United States Air Force colonel, participant in Doolittle Raid
- Dick Dobeleit – former NFL fullback, Dayton Triangles
- Dick Faust – former NFL lineman, Dayton Triangles
- Harry P. Jeffrey – one-term member of the United States House of Representatives (OH-3)
- James L. Kauffman – former United States Navy vice admiral
- Jackson Keefer – former NFL back, Dayton Triangles, et al.
- Rodney M. Love – one-term member of the United States House of Representatives (OH-3)
- Carl Mankat – former NFL lineman, Dayton Triangles
- Marvin Pierce – former president McCall Corporation, father of First Lady Barbara Bush
- Harry Reser – former banjo player and bandleader
- Paul F. Schenck – seven-term member of the United States House of Representatives (OH-3)
- Howard Dwight Smith – former architect, most known for his designs of Ohio Stadium
- Byron A. Stover – former businessman and politician from the state of Oregon
- Arthur Valpey – former college football head coach, Harvard and Connecticut
- Coby Whitmore – former painter, magazine illustrator, commercial artist, and race-car designer
- Pliny W. Williamson – former lawyer and politician from New York
- Earl Yingling – former MLB pitcher
- Roz Young – former author, educator, historian

== See also ==
- List of school districts in Ohio
- Dayton City League
