= United States Air Force Flight Dynamics Laboratory =

US Air Force Flight Dynamics Laboratory (or just Flight Dynamics Laboratory) is located at Wright-Patterson Air Force Base and is part of the Air Force Wright Laboratory. The Laboratory was eventually merged into the Air Force Research Laboratory in 1997.

The plan for FDL's 1988 fiscal year said about the laboratory's mission:

The Flight Dynamics Laboratory (FDL) is part of the Air Force Wright Aeronautical Laboratories (AFWAL), a four-laboratory organization which is part of the Aeronautical System Division located at Wright-Patterson AFB OH. The FDL is responsible for planning, formulating, and executing the USAF technology programs for aerospace vehicles in the technical domains of structures and dynamics, vehicle equipment/subsystems, flight control, and aeromechanics. The FDL maintains a superior technical base by exploring promising approaches in science and technology which will provide options in the development of Air Force systems and prevent technological surprise.

== Divisions and facilities ==
=== Vibration and Aeroelastic Facility ===
The Vibration and Aeroelastic Facility (VIAER) supported the acquisition and analysis of dynamics data in various aircraft, missile, and ground support equipment.

== Projects ==
The Flight Dynamics Laboratory developed the FDL-23, a 2nd generation Remotely Piloted Aircraft (RPA). In the early 1970s, two Ryan Model 147G reconnaissance drones were requisitioned from the Air Force Museum by the Air Force Flight Dynamics Laboratory at WPAFB to investigate high maneuverability flight and discover whether a high performance remotely piloted aircraft could perform some of the same missions as crewed aircraft. The 147G was particularly suited for this since it had an extended nose section for equipment, a more powerful engine, and a larger wing than previous FireBee variants. These aircraft were originally designed for covert, high altitude surveillance. The redesigned aircraft was fitted with a reinforced wingbox, an active rudder, a Cohu nose video camera, a Vega digital control/data link, speed brakes, and a Lear-Sieglar digital proportional autopilot. The modified drone was originally designated the FDL-23 and later the XQM-103. Six captive and six free flight test flights were performed, with the aircraft able to perform 10G turns in its final configuration. On its fifth mission, the engine shaft bent at 10 G's and impacted the compressor housing, damaging its engine. On its sixth mission, the aircraft refused to accept ground commands and self-recovered in the mountains north of Los Angeles with minor damage. The Program was completed successfully, and met all of its development objectives. Several major new systems including the digital autopilot and the command/control system were adopted by production drone programs. The major limitation to using the RPA for fighter missions was the lack of a video tracking system, which made tracking maneuvering targets extremely difficult. Future plans for the aircraft included a combination video and infrared tracker for target acquisition.

The design of the remote pilot station (RPS) was also revolutionary, featuring elements of the F-106 fighter, industrial controls, and NASA satellite control station designs. The overall system design concept required a two person crew with a Remote Pilot and Remote Flight Engineer, similar to crew assignments for two man fighters like the F-4 and F-14. The RPS Pilot station had two monitors with a nose camera view and a moving map display. The pilot controlled the aircraft with a 3-axis control stick, similar to the Apollo spacecraft. The flight engineer controlled video display, on-board system operation, and recovery commands. He viewed a monitor with a telescopic camera view of the aircraft in flight, linked to the FPS-16 tracking radar. At the conclusion of the program, the aircraft was donated to the Dugway Proving Ground in Utah, and became a static display at the entrance to Eagle Range. This aircraft reappeared at Edwards AFB without the engine as a captive test platform for optics testing.

The Program Manager was John Seaberg, the project manager was Capt. Rus Records, and the two Air Force test pilots were Maj. Mel Hyashi and Maj. Skip Holm. Maj. Holm later distinguished himself on the high performance aircraft racing circuit as the pilot of the P-51 "Dago Red" in which he won the world Unlimited championship.
