= Sinclair Community College =

Public college in Dayton, Ohio, US

Coordinates: 39°45′26″N 84°12′00″W

- Type: Public community college
- Established: 1948; 78 years ago
- Parent institution: University System of Ohio
- Academic affiliations: Space-grant, SOCHE
- Endowment: $45.4 million (2025)
- President: Steven Lee Johnson
- Students: 18,772
- Location: Dayton, Ohio, United States
- Campus: Urban
- Mascot: Tartan Pride
- Website: sinclair.edu

Sinclair Community College, a/k/a Sinclair College, is a public community college in Dayton, Ohio, United States.

== History ==
Sinclair Community College is named for David A. Sinclair, a Scottish immigrant and secretary of the Dayton YMCA (1874–1902), who founded the adult training school that eventually became Sinclair College in 1948.

Sinclair Community College was featured in a 2009 issue of The New York Times. The article explained how community colleges in the United States, like Sinclair, help to create jobs in an unstable economy. The article also stated that Sinclair is widely known as one of the best community colleges in the region. That year its enrollment was 25,345 students, and the main campus was one of the largest community college campuses in North America.

According to the Dayton Daily News, in 2013 Sinclair purchased a 3.4 acre addition to the Courseview Campus Center in Mason with the intent of eventually serving 10,000 students there. Also that year, the college opened a second Mason facility, "Building B." In August 2016, Sinclair Community College and the University of Cincinnati signed a partnership allowing Sinclair students attending the Mason campus to pursue a bachelor's degree in Information Technology at UC.

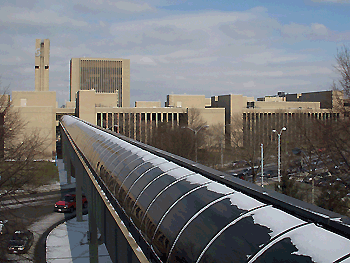
The Student Parking Tunnel at Sinclair Community College

Welcome Sign

In March 2013 the college settled a First Amendment lawsuit by revising a speech code that prohibited students and visitors from holding signs on campus. Four years later, in March 2017, the college ordered student Advisors A.J. Owens and Dr. Matt Massie to apologize to Forest Wilson, a student and candidate for Student Senate President concerning Wilson's campaign to get food stamps accepted on campus.

== Campus locations ==
Sinclair has 3 regional campus locations throughout Southwest Ohio: the main Dayton Campus, and locations in Centerville, and Mason.

== Notable alumni and faculty ==
- Buster Douglas, professional boxer
- Trudy Krisher, faculty from 2001 until her retirement
- Megan Stalter, actress, singer, and comedian

== See also ==
- List of community colleges
