= High Tech Academy =

Location
- 2900 Community College Avenue; Cleveland, Ohio 44115; United States

Information
- School type: Public, Post Secondary Enrollment Options
- Oversight: Cleveland Metropolitan School District Cuyahoga Community College
- Principal: Stacy M. Hutchinson
- Grades: 10-12
- Enrollment: 300+
- Hours in school day: 12:00PM - 1:50PM
- Campus type: City
- Mascot: Titans
- Program Coordinator: Aida de Leon Rusnov
- High School Coordinator: William Hicks, Tyanna Blanchard
- Website: www.tri-c.edu/pathways/Pages/HighTech.aspx/

High Tech Academy (commonly known as High Tech or HTA), is a post-secondary school serving grades 10-12, and is located in downtown Cleveland, Ohio, United States.

High Tech is an option school established by the Cleveland Metropolitan School District (CMSD) and Cuyahoga Community College (Tri-C). High Tech prepares high school students for technological careers and/or higher education. The programs develop the student's academic and technical skills particularly in English, reading comprehension, mathematics and information technology. Participating students attend their home high school in the morning and are transported in the afternoon for college courses at Tri-C's Metropolitan Campus in Cleveland until 2:00pm (students may take classes pass the school hours).

High Tech graduates are prepared for immediate employment, continuation at Tri-C, or transfer to four-year institution of higher education.

In the fall of 2009 Tri-C and CMSD opened another program similar to High Tech; High Achievement Academy open to 11 and 12 grade students at Whitney Young. These students will take their classes at Tri-C's Eastern Campus.

Cleveland Metropolitan School District, PNC Bank (formerly, National City Bank) and Cuyahoga Community College are sponsors of High Tech Academy.

== Background ==
High Tech Academy (HTA) is a dual enrollment program in which high school students in the Cleveland Metropolitan School District and Warrensville Heights High School attend a half day of school at their home school and then attend classes on the Tri-C campuses.

Much of the college tuition costs are paid through a state-supported plan entitled Post Secondary Enrollment Options, which allows college level classes to also count toward students’ graduation requirements in high school.

The program focuses on computer technology, business and academic core courses. The Cleveland District provides a principal, and the College provides a program manager and together they coordinate programming for 200-300 high school students annually.

There are some entry requirements for the program and all students apply through the guidance counselors at their home high school.

In some cases, students can earn an associate's degree at the same time they are earning a high school diploma.

Students may apply to HTA in the spring term of their freshman or sophomore year.

John Hay, Whitney Young and James Ford Rhodes are the leading schools in HTA. The majority of HTA's 2009-2010 enrollment comes from these three schools.

== Requirements ==
- Maintain attendance (98%-100%)
- Maintain academic standards (3.0 or higher GPA)
- Maintain a high standard of conduct
- Attend six Student Success Workshops or Career Seminars each year
- Complete fifteen hours of community service each year
- Submit a completed Application packet, which includes an essay and two letters of recommendation
- College English and mathematics assessments
- An interview with the student and parent
- All seniors attend all High Tech Academy graduation activities during their senior year in addition to their high school's graduation ceremonies.

== Extracurricular activities ==
High Tech offers

- Key Club
- Vocabulary Builders
- Boys Basketball (via Cleveland Metropolitan School District)
- Girls Basketball (via Cleveland Metropolitan School District)
- Ladies First
- Boys II Men

== Participating High Schools ==
- Cleveland School of the Arts
- John Adams
- John F. Kennedy
- John Hay
- Carl F. Shuler
- Collinwood
- East
- East Technical
- Garrett Morgan
- Ginn Academy
- Glenville
- James Ford Rhodes
- John Marshall
- Lincoln West
- Martin Luther King, Jr.
- South
- Whitney M. Young

Mc2 stem High School
