= List of OHSAA track and field champions =

The Ohio High School Athletic Association (OHSAA) is the governing body of athletic programs for junior and senior high schools in the state of Ohio. It conducts state championship competitions in all the OHSAA-sanctioned sports.

== Boys track and field champions ==
Year	Boys D I / AAA	Boys D II / AA	Boys D III / A	Boys D IV	Boys DV
2026	Huber Heights Wayne	New Philadelphia and Sunbury Big Walnut	Cleveland Glenville	Castalia Margaretta	Columbus Grove
2025	Huber Heights Wayne	Brookville	McDonald and Huron		
2024	Elyria	Huron	Maria Stein Marion Local		
2023	Toledo St. John's Jesuit	Cleveland Glenville	Maria Stein Marion Local		
2022	Pickerington Central	Cleveland Glenville	Creston Norwayne		
2021	Pickerington North	Woodridge	Minster		
2020	Tournament canceled	Tournament canceled	Tournament canceled		
2019	Pickerington Central	Shelby	East Canton		
2018	Pickerington Central	Cuyahoga Falls CVCA	East Canton		
2017	Worthington Thomas Worthington	Dayton Dunbar	East Canton		
2016	Cleveland St Ignatius	St. Clairsville	Louisville St. Thomas Aquinas		
2015	Pickerington North	Dayton Dunbar	Warren John F. Kennedy		
2014	Cleveland Glenville	Dayton Dunbar	Lima Central Catholic		
2013	Lakewood St. Edward	Akron St. Vincent – St. Mary	Gahanna Columbus Academy		
2012	Lakewood St. Edward	Dayton Dunbar	Gahanna Columbus Academy		
2011	Cincinnati La Salle	Akron St. Vincent – St. Mary	McDonald		
2010	Warren Warren G. Harding	Pemberville Eastwood	North Robinson Colonel Crawford		
2009	Gahanna Lincoln	Pemberville Eastwood	Garfield Heights Trinity		
2008	Cleveland Heights	Perkins	Bluffton		
2007	Cleveland Glenville	Heath	Miamisburg Dayton Christian		
2006	Cleveland Glenville	Akron Buchtel	Waynesfield-Goshen		
2005	Cleveland Glenville	Alliance	Findlay Liberty-Benton		
2004	Cleveland Glenville	Shelby	Dayton Jefferson Twp		
2003	Cleveland Glenville	Shelby	Columbus Grove		
2002	Middletown	Milan Edison	Marion Pleasant		
2001	Cleveland St Ignatius	Cleveland Benedictine	Lorain Clearview		
2000	Huber Heights Wayne	Poland Seminary	Cortland Maplewood and Findlay Liberty-Benton *		
1999	Worthington Thomas Worthington	Orrville	McDonald		
1998	Brunswick and Westerville North *	Cleveland Benedictine	Liberty Center		
1997	Toledo Central Catholic and Canton McKinley and Worthington Thomas Worthington *	Cleveland Benedictine	Yellow Springs and South Charleston Southeastern Local *		
1996	Akron Buchtel	Miamisburg Dayton Christian	Yellow Springs		
1995	Huber Heights Wayne	Leavittsburg Labrae	Findlay Liberty-Benton		
1994	Cincinnati La Salle	Cleveland Rhodes	Dayton Jefferson Twp		
1993	Bedford	Akron Archbishop Hoban	Yellow Springs		
1992	Cleveland John Marshall	Akron Archbishop Hoban	Yellow Springs		
1991	Cleveland John Marshall	Columbus Bishop Hartley	Pettisville		
1990	Dayton Dunbar	Youngstown Cardinal Mooney	Yellow Springs		
1989	Dayton Dunbar	Cincinnati Forest Park	Marion Catholic		
1988	Dayton Dunbar	Cincinnati Forest Park	Dayton Jefferson Twp		
1987	Toledo DeVilbiss	Dayton Jefferson Twp	Pataskala Licking Heights		
1986	Green	Columbus Bishop Hartley	Dayton Jefferson Twp		
1985	Dayton Patterson	Columbus Bishop Hartley	Yellow Springs		
1984	Alliance	Perkins	Leetonia		
1983	Marion Harding	Dayton Jefferson Twp	Columbus Father Wehrle Memorial		
1982	Cleveland Heights and Cleveland John Adams *	Dayton Roth	Miamisburg Dayton Christian		
1981	Dayton Roth	Columbus Father Wehrle Memorial	Gahanna Columbus Academy		
1980	Lancaster	Dayton Jefferson Twp	Columbus Father Wehrle Memorial		
1979	Gahanna Lincoln	Columbus Mifflin	Lorain Clearview		
1978	Mansfield Senior	Barnesville	Lorain Clearview		
1977	Columbus Linden Mc Kinley	Dayton Jefferson Twp	Gahanna Columbus Academy		
1976	Alliance and Cleveland John Adams *	Dayton Roth	Shadyside		
1975	Cleveland Glenville	Columbus Mifflin	Yellow Springs		
1974	Cleveland Glenville	Huron	Columbus Father Wehrle Memorial		
1973	Cleveland Glenville	Brookville	Lorain Clearview		
1972	Toledo Libbey	Ottawa-Glandorf	Frankfort Adena		
1971	Dayton Roosevelt	Gates Mills Gilmour Academy	Cleveland Heights Lutheran East		
1970		Cleveland Glenville	Cortland Lakeview		
1969		Cleveland John F Kennedy	Arcanum		
1968		Cleveland Glenville	Kent State High		
1967		Cleveland Glenville	Kirtland		
1966		Cleveland Glenville	Batavia		
1965		Cleveland Glenville	Fairport Harding		
1964		Dayton Dunbar	Fairport Harding		
1963		Dayton Dunbar	Cincinnati DePorres		
1962		Cleveland Collinwood	Braceville		
1961		Dayton Roosevelt	Cincinnati DePorres		
1960		Cleveland Glenville	Paulding		
1959		Cleveland Glenville	West Alexandria		
1958		Springfield	Xenia Woodrow Wilson		
1957		Springfield	Dayton Jefferson Twp and Braceville *		
1956		Akron North and Cleveland John Adams *	Xenia Woodrow Wilson		
1955		Cleveland East Tech	Xenia Woodrow Wilson		
1954		Barberton	Nevada		
1953		Cleveland John Adams	Clyde		
1952		Cleveland East Tech	Belpre		
1951		Cincinnati Central	Poland		
1950		Cincinnati Central	Cincinnati Wyoming		
1949		Cleveland Central	Plainville		
1948		Dayton Dunbar	Independence		
1947		Cleveland Central	Poland		
1946		Toledo DeVilbiss	New London		
1945		Mansfield Senior	Lockland		
1944		Cleveland East Tech	Pepper Pike Orange		
1943		Cleveland East Tech	Rome Township Stewart		
1942		Cleveland East Tech	Ohio Soldiers & Sailors Orphanage		
1941		Cleveland Heights and Cleveland East Tech *	Ohio Soldiers & Sailors Orphanage		
1940		Cleveland East Tech	Ohio Soldiers & Sailors Orphanage		
1939		Cleveland East Tech	Upper Arlington		
1938		Toledo Scott	Columbiana		
1937		Sandusky	Upper Arlington		
1936		Cleveland East Tech	Oberlin		
1935		Toledo Scott	Glendale		
1934		Toledo Scott	Delta		
1933		Cleveland East Tech	Mentor		
1932		Cleveland East Tech	Oberlin		
1931		Lakewood	Dayton Oakwood		
1930		Columbus Central	Dayton Oakwood		
1929		Columbus Central	Dayton Oakwood		
1928		Columbus Central	Cincinnati Hartwell		
1927		Columbus Central	Rocky River		
1926		Lakewood	Shaker Heights		
1925		Cincinnati Hughes Center	Bellpoint		
1924		Lakewood	Rocky River		
1923		Lakewood	Rocky River		
1922		Lakewood	Ashley		
1921		Cleveland East Tech	Galion		
1920		Cleveland East Tech			
1919		East Cleveland Shaw			
1918		Toledo Scott			
1917		Toledo Scott			
1916		East Cleveland Shaw			
1915		East Cleveland Shaw			
1914		Columbus East			
1913		Toledo Central			
1912		Toledo Central			
1911		Columbus North			
1910		Toledo Central			
1909		Toledo Central			
1908		Columbus North			

* Tie

== Girls track and field champions ==
Year	Girls D I / AAA	Girls D II / AA	Girls D III / A	Girls D IV	Girls D V
2026	Avon	Dayton Chaminade Julienne	Dayton Oakwood	Beachwood	Columbus Grove
2025	Hillard Davidson	Hathaway Brown	Coldwater		
2024	Huber Heights Wayne	Peninsula Woodridge	Smithville		
2023	Gahanna Lincoln	Peninsula Woodridge	Elmore Woodmore		
2022	Gahanna Lincoln	Oakwood	North Robinson Colonel Crawford		
2021	Mentor	Oakwood	West Liberty-Salem		
2020	Tournament canceled	Tournament canceled	Tournament canceled		
2019	Liberty Township Lakota East	Cincinnati Indian Hill	West Liberty-Salem		
2018	Gahanna Lincoln	Beachwood	Minster		
2017	Cincinnati Withrow	Beachwood	Anna		
2016	Cincinnati Withrow	Findlay Liberty-Benton	Louisville St. Thomas Aquinas		
2015	Gahanna Lincoln	Findlay Liberty-Benton	Louisville St. Thomas Aquinas		
2014	Solon	Dayton Meadowdale	McDonald		
2013	Solon	Columbus Eastmoor Academy	Versailles		
2012	Reynoldsburg	Akron St. Vincent – St. Mary	Versailles		
2011	Reynoldsburg	Columbus Bishop Hartley	Steubenville Catholic Central		
2010	Reynoldsburg	Cleveland Collinwood	Versailles		
2009	Reynoldsburg	Columbus Bishop Hartley and Cuyahoga Falls CVCA	Gates Mills Gilmour Academy		
2008	Cleveland Heights Beaumont	Cuyahoga Falls CVCA	Bellaire St. John Central		
2007	Cleveland Heights Beaumont	Akron Buchtel	Gates Mills Gilmour Academy and Bellaire St. John Central *		
2006	Cleveland Collinwood	Mantua Crestwood	Gates Mills Gilmour Academy		
2005	Cleveland Collinwood	Columbus Eastmoor Academy	Gates Mills Gilmour Academy		
2004	Mason and Cleveland Collinwood *	Columbus Eastmoor Academy	Minster		
2003	Elyria	Shelby	Minster		
2002	Cleveland Heights Beaumont	Ottawa-Glandorf	Minster		
2001	Cleveland Collinwood and Cleveland Heights Beaumont *	Upper Sandusky	Minster		
2000	Cleveland Collinwood	Upper Sandusky	Gates Mills Hawken		
1999	Cleveland Collinwood	Cleveland Heights Beaumont	Gates Mills Hawken		
1998	Cleveland Collinwood and Columbus Brookhaven *	Cleveland Heights Beaumont	Lancaster Fisher Catholic		
1997	Cleveland Collinwood	Cleveland Heights Beaumont	Rawson Cory-Rawson		
1996	Cleveland Heights Beaumont	Coldwater	Defiance Ayersville		
1995	Trotwood-Madison and Cleveland Heights *	Dover	Coldwater		
1994	Cleveland John Adams and Rocky River Magnificat *	Cleveland Heights Beaumont	Coldwater		
1993	Rocky River Magnificat	Perkins	Elmore Woodmore and Middletown Bishop Fenwick *		
1992	Cleveland Heights	Cleveland Heights Beaumont and Springfield Shawnee *	North Robinson Colonel Crawford		
1991	Cleveland Heights	Cleveland Heights Beaumont	North Robinson Colonel Crawford		
1990	Cleveland Heights	Cleveland Heights Beaumont	North Robinson Colonel Crawford		
1989	Cincinnati Princeton	Cleveland Heights Beaumont	Minster		
1988	Cleveland Heights Beaumont	Columbus Bishop Hartley	Baltimore Liberty Union		
1987	Cleveland Heights Beaumont	Kansas Lakota	Newark Catholic		
1986	Cleveland Heights Beaumont	Columbus Bishop Hartley	Cincinnati Academy of Physical Education		
1985	Upper Arlington	Southeast	Minster		
1984	Trotwood-Madison	Columbus Bishop Hartley	Zanesville Bishop Rosecrans		
1983	Trotwood-Madison	Columbus East	Zanesville Bishop Rosecrans		
1982	Columbus Mifflin	Columbus East	Minster		
1981	Centerville	St Clairsville	Zanesville Bishop Rosecrans		
1980	Toledo Start	Girard	Minster		
1979	Cleveland John Adams	Dayton Jefferson Twp	Minster		
1978	Cleveland John Adams	Liberty	Minster		
1977	Toledo Rogers	Dayton Jefferson Twp	Minster		
1976	Dayton Stivers	Dayton Jefferson Twp	Minster		
1975	Toledo Scott	Doylestown Chippewa	Frankfort Adena		

== See also ==
- List of Ohio High School Athletic Association championships
- List of high schools in Ohio
- Ohio High School Athletic Conferences
- Ohio High School Athletic Association
