= List of OHSAA wrestling champions =

The Ohio High School Athletic Association (OHSAA) is the governing body of athletic programs for junior and senior high schools in the state of Ohio. It conducts state championship competitions in all the OHSAA-sanctioned sports.

== Individual tournament champions ==
Year	D I / AAA	D II / AA	D III / A	Girls
2026	Perrysburg	Columbus Bishop Watterson	St. Paris Graham	Massillon Perry
2025	Lakewood St. Edward	Columbus Bishop Watterson	St. Paris Graham	Olentangy Orange
2024	Lakewood St. Edward	St. Paris Graham	Milan Edison	Olentangy Orange
2023	Lakewood St. Edward	St. Paris Graham	Xenia Legacy Christian	Harrison
2022	Lakewood St. Edward	St. Paris Graham	Xenia Legacy Christian	
2021	Lakewood St. Edward	St. Paris Graham	Xenia Legacy Christian	
2020	Tournament canceled	Tournament canceled	Tournament canceled	
2019	Lakewood St. Edward	St. Paris Graham	Genoa Area	
2018	Lakewood St. Edward	St. Paris Graham	Genoa Area	
2017	Lakewood St. Edward	St. Paris Graham	Mechanicsburg	
2016	Lakewood St. Edward	St. Paris Graham	Delta	
2015	Lakewood St. Edward	St. Paris Graham	Dayton Christian	
2014	Perry	St. Paris Graham	Delta	
2013	Lakewood St. Edward	St. Paris Graham	Troy Christian	
2012	Lakewood St. Edward	St. Paris Graham	Apple Creek Waynedale	
2011	Lakewood St. Edward	St. Paris Graham	Bedford St. Peter Chanel	
2010	Wadsworth	St. Paris Graham	Monroeville	
2009	Lakewood St. Edward	St. Paris Graham	Troy Christian	
2008	Lakewood St. Edward	St. Paris Graham	Troy Christian	
2007	Lakewood St. Edward	St. Paris Graham	Troy Christian	
2006	Lakewood St. Edward	St. Paris Graham	Sandusky St. Mary Central Catholic	
2005	Lakewood St. Edward	St. Paris Graham	Sandusky St. Mary Central Catholic	
2004	Lakewood St. Edward	St. Paris Graham	Sandusky St. Mary Central Catholic	
2003	Lakewood St. Edward	St. Paris Graham	Sandusky St. Mary Central Catholic	
2002	Lakewood St. Edward	St. Paris Graham	Sandusky St. Mary Central Catholic	
2001	Lakewood St. Edward	St. Paris Graham	Akron St. Vincent - St. Mary	
2000	Lakewood St. Edward	Cuyahoga Falls Walsh Jesuit	Sandusky St. Mary Central Catholic	
1999	Lakewood St. Edward	Cuyahoga Falls Walsh Jesuit	Delta	
1998	Lakewood St. Edward	St. Paris Graham	Delta	
1997	Lakewood St. Edward	Cuyahoga Falls Walsh Jesuit	Streetsboro	
1996	Cuyahoga Falls Walsh Jesuit	Coventry	Delta	
1995	Cuyahoga Falls Walsh Jesuit	Clyde	Aurora	
1994	Cuyahoga Falls Walsh Jesuit	Garfield Heights	Sandusky St. Mary Central Catholic	
1993	Cuyahoga Falls Walsh Jesuit	Ravenna	Coventry	
1992	Lakewood St. Edward	Uhrichsville Claymont	Thompson Ledgemont	
1991	Cuyahoga Falls Walsh Jesuit	Southeast	West Liberty-Salem	
1990	Cleveland St. Joseph	Solon	Columbus Bishop Ready	
1989	Lakewood St. Edward	Mentor Lake Catholic	Delta	
1988	Cleveland St. Ignatius	Bedford St. Peter Chanel	Bridgeport	
1987	Lakewood St. Edward	Bedford St. Peter Chanel	Cadiz Harrison Central	
1986	Lakewood St. Edward	Bedford St. Peter Chanel	Newbury	
1985	Lakewood St. Edward	Oregon Cardinal Stritch	Pataskala Licking Heights	
1984	Lakewood St. Edward	Barnesville	Richmond Heights	
1983	Lakewood St. Edward	Bedford St. Peter Chanel	Richmond Heights	
1982	Lakewood St. Edward	St. Paris Graham	Columbus Bishop Ready	
1981	Lakewood St. Edward	Highland	Bluffton	
1980	Lakewood St. Edward	Coventry	Richmond Heights	
1979	Lakewood St. Edward	Coventry	Richmond Heights	
1978	Lakewood St. Edward	Coventry	Middlefield Cardinal	
1977	Macedonia Nordonia	Columbus St. Francis De Sales	Pataskala Licking Heights	
1976	Cleveland Heights	Mantua Crestwood	Pataskala Licking Heights	
1975	Eastlake North	Highland		
1974	Maple Heights	Columbus St. Francis De Sales		
1973	Elyria	Southeast		
1972	Parma Heights Valley Forge & Bay Village Bay *	Kenston		
1971	Maple Heights	Columbus St. Francis De Sales		
1970	Toledo St. Francis De Sales			
1969	Maple Heights			
1968	Maple Heights			
1967	Maple Heights			
1966	Maple Heights			
1965	North Canton Hoover			
1964	Toledo St. Francis De Sales			
1963	Maple Heights			
1962	Maple Heights			
1961	Cleveland John Marshall			
1960	Garfield Heights			
1959	Bridgeport			
1958	Euclid			
1957	Maple Heights			
1956	Maple Heights			
1955	Bedford			
1954	Shaker Heights			
1953	Cleveland West Technical			
1952	Euclid			
1951	Cleveland West			
1950	Cleveland West			
1949	Euclid			
1948	Cleveland West Technical & Lakewood *			
1947	Cleveland West			
1946	Cleveland West Technical			
1945	Cleveland West Technical			
1944	Cleveland West Technical			
1943	Cleveland John Hay			
1942	Wadsworth			
1941	Cleveland John Hay			
1940	Cleveland John Hay			
1939	Cleveland John Hay			
1938	Cleveland John Hay			

* Tie

== Dual Team Meet tournament champions ==
Year	D I	D II	D III
2021	Tournament disbanded by OHSAA	Tournament disbanded by OHSAA	Tournament disbanded by OHSAA
2020	Lakewood St. Edward	Louisville	Milan Edison
2019	Lakewood St. Edward	St. Paris Graham	Genoa Area
2018	St. Paris Graham	Wauseon	Genoa Area
2017	Lakewood St. Edward	St. Paris Graham	Milan Edison
2016	Lakewood St. Edward	St. Paris Graham	Delta
2015	Brecksville-Broadview Heights	St. Paris Graham	Delta
2014	Perry	St. Paris Graham	Delta
2013	Lakewood St. Edward	St. Paris Graham	Delta

== See also ==
- List of Ohio High School Athletic Association championships
- List of high schools in Ohio
- Ohio High School Athletic Conferences
- Ohio High School Athletic Association
