= Conya Doss =

American singer-songwriter

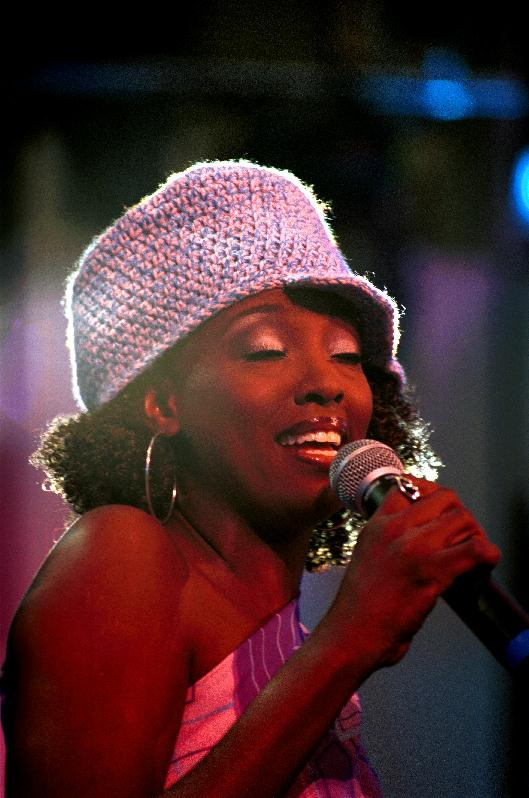
- Conya Doss performing at the Rock and Roll Hall of Fame in Cleveland, Ohio, in February 2003

Background information
- Born: Conya Doss; June 13, 1972 (age 53); Cleveland, Ohio, United States
- Genres: R&B, neo soul
- Occupations: Singer-songwriter, music producer, educator
- Instruments: voice, organ
- Years active: 1995–present
- Labels: Conya Doss Songs, Inc., Dome, Orpheus
- Website: https://www.conyadoss.com

Conya Doss (born June 13, 1972) is an American singer-songwriter, music producer, and educator. She is known as The Queen of Indie Soul.

In the late 1990s, Doss formed a music duo called Lyrik. After the duo disbanded, she released her debut album A Poem About Ms. Doss (2002), which featured the single "Coffee", which gained substantial airplay from the Cleveland area radio stations. In 2004, Doss formed her own independent record label Conya Doss Songs, Inc. and released her second album, Just Because.

She released seven more albums on her own label including: Love Rain Down (2006), Still... (2008), Blü Transition (2010), A Pocketful of Purpose (2012), Seven: VII (2015), Clear (2018), and Through Rose-Colored Glasses (2021).

== Early life ==
Conya Doss was born on April 13, 1972, in Cleveland, Ohio, to Carolyn Pruitt (née Doss), a therapeutic program worker, and Ronald Pruitt. She also has two other siblings Devaughn Reed and Tamara Pruitt. Doss enrolled in the Cleveland School of the Arts where she graduated in 1990. She received her teaching credential from the Cleveland Metropolitan School District and became a teacher of special education.

== Career ==
=== 1995–2004: Career beginnings ===
In 1995, Doss performed background vocals on Elaine Richardson's song "The Whole Shebang". In the late 1990s, Doss formed a short-lived music duo called Lyrik with childhood friend and singer Stacy Richardson. In 2000, Doss worked with American girl group 3LW. She co-wrote the song "I Think You Should Know" and vocally arranged the song "Ocean" for their debut self-titled album in December 2000. Doss released her debut album A Poem About Ms. Doss in August 2002 on Orpheus Records. The album featured the single "Coffee", a minor local hit in the Cleveland area.

In November 2004, she released her second album Just Because on her own independent record label Conya Doss Songs, Inc. The album spawned the singles "Missin' You" and "Damn That".

=== 2005–2013: Love Rain Down and career breakthrough ===
In August 2006, Doss released her third album Love Rain Down. The album's lead single "Tell Me Why" received positive reviews from music critics. In April 2008, she released her fourth album Still... The album's lead single "What I'd Do" peaked at number 79 on the US Hot R&B/Hip-Hop Songs chart. The song earned Doss a nomination for "Best Underground Artist" at the BETJ Virtual Awards. In 2008, Doss won Female Vocalist of the Year at annual Soultracks Readers' Choice Awards. In September 2010, she released her fifth album Blü Transition, which spawned the singles "What We Gone Do" and "All in You". In April 2012, she released her sixth album A Pocketful of Purpose. The album's lead single "Don't Change" peaked at number 72 on the US Hot R&B/Hip-Hop Songs chart.

=== 2014–present: Current projects ===
In 2015, she released her seventh album Seven: VII, which spawned the single "Don't Change". She released her eighth album Clear in 2018, followed by her ninth album Through Rose-Colored Glasses in 2021.

== Personal life ==
In 2010, Doss gave birth to her son named Landon Blu. She named her fifth album after him.

== Philanthropy ==
Conya Doss also mentors teen girls, tutors, and is an active philanthropist for breast cancer, HIV/AIDS, and mental health awareness. On March 8, at the House of Blues, in Chicago, she performed to benefit the AIDS Foundation of Chicago. She has been an ambassador for BET's Rap-It-UP campaign, and in 2013, joined Brandy Norwood and Civil Rights leader, Julian Bond for the "Keep The Promise" March & Rally in Ohio, U.S.

== Discography ==
=== Studio albums ===
Title	Album details
A Poem about Ms. Doss	Released: August 13, 2002; Label: Orpheus; Formats: CD
Just Because	Released: November 9, 2004; Label: Conya Doss Songs, Inc., Dome; Formats: CD, digital download
Love Rain Down	Released: August 28, 2006; Label: Conya Doss Songs, Inc., Dome; Formats: CD, digital download
Still...	Released: April 7, 2008; Label: Conya Doss Songs, Inc., Dome; Formats: CD, digital download
Blü Transition	Released: September 28, 2010; Label: Conya Doss Songs, Inc.; Formats: CD, digital download
A Pocketful of Purpose	Released: May 1, 2012; Label: Conya Doss Songs, Inc.; Formats: CD, digital download
Seven: VII	Released: May 19, 2015; Label: Conya Doss Songs, Inc.; Formats: CD, digital download
Clear	Released: October 12, 2018; Label: Conya Doss Songs, Inc.; Formats: Digital download, streaming
Through Rose-Colored Glasses	Released: June 13, 2021; Label: Conya Doss Songs, Inc.; Formats: Digital download, streaming

=== Singles ===
List of singles as lead artist, with selected chart positions, showing year released and album name
Title	Year	Peak chart positions	Album
Title	Year	US R&B /Hip-Hop	Album
"Coffee"	2002	—	A Poem about Ms. Doss
"Missin' You"	2004	—	Just Because
"Damn That"	2005	—	Just Because
"Tell Me Why"	2006	—	Love Rain Down
"What I'd Do"	2008	79	Still...
"It's Over"	2008	—	Still...
"What We Gone Do"	2010	—	Blü Transition
"All in You"	2010	—	Blü Transition
"Wi-Fi"	2011	—	Blü Transition
"Don't Change"	2012	72	A Pocketful of Purpose
"Here for You"	2012	—	A Pocketful of Purpose
"You Got Me"	2014	—	Seven: VII
"Love's Not"	2015	—	Seven: VII
"When We Love"	2015	—	Seven: VII
"I'm Trying"	2017	—	Seven: VII
"Until"	2018	—	Seven: VII
"Back to Us"	2018	—	Seven: VII
"Not Trading You"	2020	—	Through Rose-Colored Glasses
"Wishful Thinking" (featuring B. Golden)	2021	—	Through Rose-Colored Glasses
"6019"	2021	—	Non-album single
"4everlasting" (featuring B. Golden)	2023	—	Non-album single
"I Can't Stand to Lose"	2024	—	Non-album single

== Awards and nominations ==
These are the awards won by Conya Doss.

Year	Category	Nominated work	Result
Ohio Hip Hop Awards
2007	Best Female Vocalist		Won
Soultracks Readers' Choice Award
2007	Best Female Vocalist		Nominated
2008	Female Vocalist of the Year	"Still"	Won
Centric/BET J Virtual Awards
2008	Female Vocalist of the Year	"What I'd Do"	Nominated
