= Hoban Dominican High School =

Coordinates: 41°26′54″N 81°33′13″W

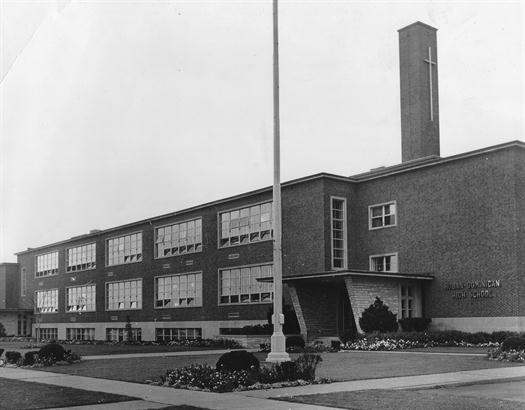
- Hoban Dominican High School side entrance.

Location
- 17900 Harvard Avenue; Cleveland, (Cuyahoga County), Ohio 44128; United States

Information
- Type: Private, All-Girls
- Religious affiliation: Roman Catholic
- Established: 1951
- Status: Sold to Cleveland Metropolitan School District
- Closed: 1971
- Oversight: Roman Catholic Diocese of Cleveland
- Grades: 9–12
- Accreditation: North Central Association of Colleges and Schools

Hoban Dominican High School was one of seven all-female Catholic high school located in Cleveland, Ohio. The school was sponsored by the Adrian Dominican Sisters and named in honor of Archbishop Edward F. Hoban, who had been appointed Bishop of Cleveland in 1945 and elevated to Archbishop by Pope Pius XII in July 1951. It officially opened on September 10, 1951, with 13 teachers and 135 students. Over its two decades of operation the school produced over 3,000 graduates before closing on June 7, 1971, due to declining enrollment amid broader changes in Catholic education across the diocese. It was located in the Roman Catholic Diocese of Cleveland. The academic environment provided a 12 to 1 student to faculty ratio with an average of 23 students per class. 96% of Hoban Dominican students were Catholic and represented over 70 parishes.

== Closing ==
Hoban Dominican was closed in 1971 by diocesan officials. Hoban Dominican's campus was sold to the Cleveland Metropolitan School District in 1973. The campus was then changed to Whitney M. Young Middle School in 1973. In 2007 it was renamed to Whitney M. Young School, then in 2009 Whitney M. Young High School. The original crosses that were on the building remain in place, except for the one on the school's chimney. With the closing of Hoban Dominican High School, St. Joseph Academy and Erieview Catholic became the only area Catholic high school in the city of Cleveland dedicated to the education of young women.
