= Senate Athletic League =

The Senate Athletic League is an Ohio High School Athletic Association athletic league that began conference play in the early 1900s and is entirely made up of schools located within Cleveland, Ohio.

== Members ==
The current Senate Athletic League members.

School	Location	Nickname	Colors	Membership Years
John Adams	Cleveland	Rebels	Maroon, gold	1923-1995, 2006-
Jane Addams	Cleveland	Executives	Green, gold	1985-
East Technical	Cleveland	Mighty Scarabs	Brown, gold	1908-
Glenville	Cleveland	Tarblooders	Red, black	1905-
Max S. Hayes	Cleveland	Lakers	Royal blue, white	1957-
John F. Kennedy	Cleveland	Fighting Eagles	Red, white, & blue	1966-
Martin Luther King, Jr.	Cleveland	Crusaders	Black, teal	1972-
Lincoln-West	Cleveland	Wolverines	Red, white, & blue	1961-
John Marshall	Cleveland	Lawyers	Red, white	1936-
James F. Rhodes	Cleveland	Rams	Blue, white	1936-
John Hay	Cleveland	Hornets	Green, gold	1936-

== Former members ==
The all-time members of the Senate Athletic League. Red depicts current membership, Green depicts former members that either closed or left the league.

School	Nickname	Location	Colors	Membership Years	Notes
Aviation	Thunderbirds	Cleveland	Blue, gold	1965-1995	
Benedictine	Bengals	Cleveland	Columbia blue, white	1936-1972	
Cathedral Latin	Lions	Chardon	Purple, gold	1936-1967	
Central	Trojans	Cleveland	colors unknown	1904-1952	
Collinwood	Railroaders	Cleveland	Blue, gray	1924-2026	
East	Blue Bombers	Cleveland	Blue, gold	1904-2010	
Holy Name	Green Wave	Parma Heights	Green, white	1936-1975	
Lincoln	Presidents	Cleveland	colors unknown	1936-1970	consolidated with West
St. Ignatius	Wildcats	Cleveland	Blue, gold	1936-1979	
South	Flyers	Cleveland	Black, orange	1904-2010	
West	Cowboys	Cleveland	colors unknown	1904-1961	consolidated with Lincoln
West Technical	Warriors	Cleveland	Red, white	1904-1995	
Whitney M. Young	Warriors	Cleveland	Black, gold	2004-2018	

== History ==
The Senate Athletic League is one of the oldest high school athletic conferences in Ohio and is composed primarily of schools from the Cleveland Metropolitan School District in Cleveland, Ohio. The league traces its origins to 1904 when administrators from Cleveland’s public high schools created the Public Schools Athletic League of Cleveland to organize and regulate interscholastic athletic competition among the city’s schools. The organization was established to oversee scheduling, maintain eligibility standards, and encourage sportsmanship among student-athletes.

In its early years, the league consisted of only a handful of Cleveland public high schools, but it quickly expanded as new schools opened throughout the city during the early twentieth century. Over time, the conference became widely known as the “Senate League” or simply “The Senate.” As Cleveland’s population grew, the league expanded to include nearly every public high school in the city, eventually becoming one of the largest interscholastic athletic conferences in the state.

Throughout the twentieth century, the Senate League gained statewide recognition for its competitive athletic programs. Schools such as Glenville High School, East Technical High School, John Marshall High School, and Collinwood High School became well known for producing successful teams and athletes. Senate League programs have collectively won numerous state championships and have produced hundreds of athletes who earned All-Ohio honors, helping establish the conference as one of the most historically significant leagues in Ohio high school athletics.

Membership in the league has fluctuated over time as schools opened, closed, or consolidated within the Cleveland school system. Several long-time members—including East High School and South High School—closed during the early twenty-first century as part of district restructuring. These changes significantly reduced the number of participating schools but the Senate League continued to operate as the primary athletic conference for Cleveland’s public high schools.
