= High Achievement Academy =

Coordinates: 41°26′45″N 81°30′06″W

Location
- 4250 Richmond Road; Beachwood, Ohio 44122; United States

Information
- School type: Public, Post Secondary Enrollment Options
- Established: August 24, 2009
- Oversight: Cleveland Metropolitan School District Cuyahoga Community College
- Principal: Karen Byron-Johnson
- Grades: 11–12
- Campus type: City
- Current school year: 2010–2011 August 24 - May 11
- School hours: 11:30 AM – 2:00 PM
- Phone number: (216)283-5220
- Website: High Achievement Academy

High Achievement Academy (commonly known as High Achievement or HAA), is a post-secondary school serving grades 11–12. Located in Beachwood, Ohio for Cleveland Metropolitan School District students.

High Achievement first opened its doors in Beachwood, Ohio to 15 juniors and 15 seniors who attend Whitney M. Young High School in Cleveland, Ohio on Monday, August 24, 2009.

High Achievement is an option school established by the Cleveland Metropolitan School District (CMSD) and Cuyahoga Community College (Tri-C). High Achievement prepares high school students for technological careers or higher education in a resource-rich learning environment. The program develops the students' academic and technical skills, particularly in English, reading comprehension, mathematics and information technology. Participating students attend their home high school in the morning and are transported in the afternoon for college courses at Tri-C's Eastern Campus in Beachwood until 2:00 pm (students may take classes past the school hours).

High Achievement is similar to another program Tri-C and CMSD opened previously High Tech Academy open to 10–12 grade students in the Cleveland Metropolitan and Warrensville Heights School Districts. These students will take their classes at Tri-C's Metropolitan Campus.

Cleveland Metropolitan School District and Cuyahoga Community College are sponsors of High Achievement Academy.

== Background ==
High Achievement is a dual enrollment program in which high school students in the Cleveland Metropolitan School District whom attend Whitney Young High School attend a half day of school at Whitney Young and then attend classes on the Tri-C campuses.

Much of the college tuition costs are paid through a state-supported plan entitled Post Secondary Enrollment Options, which allows college level classes to also count toward student's graduation requirements in high school.

The program focuses on computer technology, business and academic core courses. The Cleveland District provides a principal, and the College provides a program manager and together they coordinate programming for school students annually.

There are some entry requirements for the program and all students apply through the guidance counselors.

In some cases, students can earn an associate's degree at the same time they are earning a high school diploma.

Students may apply to High Achievement in the Spring term of their sophomore year.

== Requirements ==
- Maintain excellent attendance (98–100%)
- Maintain academic standards (3.0 or higher GPA)
- Maintain a high standard of conduct
- Attend ten Student Success Workshops or Career Seminars each year
- Complete ten hours of community of service each year
- Submit a completed Application packet, which includes an essay and two letters of recommendation
- College English and mathematics assessments
- An interview with the student and parent
- Passed all five parts of Ohio Graduation Test

== Current participating high schools ==
- Whitney M. Young

== See also ==
- Cuyahoga Community College
- Cleveland Metropolitan School District
