= Dawnn Karen =

American fashion psychologist, professor of psychology, author, and model

- Born: December 10; Cleveland, Ohio, US
- Education: Psychology and ethnic studies, Bowling Green University Master of Arts from Teachers College, Columbia University
- Occupations: Fashion psychologist and professor
- Known for: Founder of the Fashion Psychology Field and Institute
- Notable work: Author of Dress Your Best Life
- Website: https://www.fashionpsychologysuccess.com/

Dawnn Karen is an American fashion psychologist, professor of psychology, author, and freelance model.

== Life ==
=== Early life ===
Karen was born in Cleveland, Ohio. She is of African-American and Jamaican heritage. In secondary school she skipped the 5th grade and soon after attended high school at the Cleveland School of the Arts, majoring in vocal music (opera) and minoring in creative writing.

For her undergraduate studies, Karen attended Bowling Green State University, majoring in Psychology and minoring in Ethnic studies. While attending, she made and sold her own jewelry. For her graduate studies, she attended Teachers College, Columbia University, graduating with a Masters of Arts in counseling psychology. While there, she interned at a public relations agency.

=== Personal life ===
Karen currently resides in New York City.

== Career ==
=== Fashion psychologist ===
Karen claims to be the world's first fashion psychologist, and has trademarked the term "Fashion Psychology Field". However, University of Delaware professor Jaehee Jung has offered a course titled the "Social Psychological Aspects of Clothing", combining the fields of fashion and psychology. In addition, Carolyn Mair, author of Fashion Psychology, established the first course and degree program in the psychology of fashion in 2012 at the London College of Fashion at the University of the Arts London. Professor Paola Pizza contributed to the promotion of Fashion Psychology in Italy, beginning to teach in 1992 in courses and master’s programs at Polimoda in Florence, where she served for approximately 25 years as a lecturer in Fashion Psychology, the Psychology of Fashion Consumption, and the Psychology of Sales. She also authored the first Italian handbook of Social Psychology of Fashion (Social Psychology of Fashion: Clothing and Identity, Verona, QuiEdit, first edition 2010; updated second edition 2024).

In the beginning of her career, she traveled the Middle East and Eurasia to gather research, creating her fashion psychology field theories. She has worked with clients such as Klarna, A$AP Rocky, PayPal, and Honey.

She has spoken at the Kyiv Security Forum on the burkini ban, and at the United Nations on empowering women via fashion psychology.

In 2018, the New York Times described her as "The Dress Doctor". The Times has also called her "the world’s first fashion psychologist".

=== Professor ===
Karen claimed to have been the first black female psychology professor at the Fashion Institute of Technology in April 2015. However, the claim is misleading and inaccurate because Karen was not a full-time professor nor was she the first black female adjunct psychology professor at FIT--she was preceded by at least two others. At FIT, she taught courses including The Psychology of Color and General Psychology in the Social sciences department.

=== Modeling ===
Karen worked as a freelance model while attending Teachers College Columbia University.

== Publications ==
Her book Dress Your Best Life; How to Harness the Power of Clothes To Transform Your Confidence was published in the UK on March 26, 2020. It was also published in the US under Dress Your Best Life; How to Use Fashion Psychology to Take Your Look -- and Your Life -- to the Next Level on April 14, 2020.
