= Omari Jordan =

American football player (born 1978)

No. 91
- Position: Defensive tackle

Personal information
- Born: April 15, 1978 (age 48); Cleveland, Ohio, U.S.
- Listed height: 6 ft 4 in (1.93 m)
- Listed weight: 315 lb (143 kg)

Career information
- High school: Collinwood (Cleveland)
- College: Buffalo
- NFL draft: 2002: undrafted

Career history
- Baltimore Ravens (2002)*; Buffalo Bills (2002)*; Carolina Panthers (2003–2004)
- * Offseason or practice squad member only
- Stats at Pro Football Reference

Omari Jammile Jordan (born April 15, 1978) is an American former professional football defensive tackle who played for the Carolina Panthers of the National Football League (NFL). He played college football for the Buffalo Bulls.

== Early life ==
Omari Jammile Jordan was born on April 15, 1978, in Cleveland, Ohio. He played high school football at Collinwood High School in Cleveland. He also threw the discus on the track team.

== College career ==
Jordan first played college football at Vermilion Community College. He posted 58 tackles and eight sacks during the 1998 season. In April 1999, he transferred to the University at Buffalo. Jordan had to sit out the 1999 season. He was a two-year letterman for the Bulls from 2000 to 2001. He recorded 35 tackles and 1.5 sacks as a senior in 2001.

== Professional career ==
After going undrafted in the 2002 NFL draft, Jordan signed with the Baltimore Ravens on April 26, 2002. He was released on August 30, 2002.

Jordan was signed to the practice squad of the Buffalo Bills on October 2, 2002. He became a free agent after the season, and re-signed with the Bills on January 6, 2003. He was released on August 20, 2003.

Jordan was signed to the Carolina Panthers' practice squad on December 17, 2003. He became a free agent after the season, and re-signed with the Panthers on February 11, 2004. He was released on November 16 but re-signed again on November 30, 2004. Jordan played in four games overall for the Panthers during the 2004 season, totaling one solo tackle, two assisted tackles, and one sack. He became a free agent again after the season, and re-signed with the Panthers on April 20, 2005. He was released on August 29, 2005.
