= South High School (Cleveland) =

Public, coeducational high school in Cleveland, Ohio, United States

Location
- 7415 Broadway Avenue; Cleveland, (Cuyahoga County), Ohio 44105; United States; 41°27′25″N 81°38′5″W

Information
- Type: Public, Coeducational high school
- Status: CLOSED
- Closed: June 10, 2010
- Superintendent
- Principal: Erik Thorson
- Grades: 9-12
- Colors: Black and Orange
- Athletics conference: Senate League
- Team name: Flyers
- Accreditation: North Central Association of Colleges and Schools
- Website: http://www.cmsdnet.net

South High School was a public high school located in Cleveland, Ohio in the historic Slavic Village neighborhood. It was part of the Cleveland Metropolitan School District. Opened in 1894, it was the second high school established in the city. Their nickname was the Flyers. In June 2010 South High was closed by the 2010 Academic Transformation Plan that was issued by the Cleveland Public School System. Among the school's notable students was Hank Ruszkowski, who went on to play catcher for the Cleveland Indians baseball team.

== Ohio High School Athletic Association State Championships ==
- Baseball - 1961
