= Jane Addams Business Careers Center =

Public school in Ohio, United States

Location
- 2373 East 30th Street; Cleveland, (Cuyahoga County), Ohio 44115; United States; 41°29′42″N 81°39′58″W

Information
- Type: Public, Coeducational high school
- Motto: A School that Means Business
- School district: Cleveland Metropolitan School District
- Principal: Wanda Grondin
- Faculty: 40 (on FTE basis
- Grades: 9-12
- Student to teacher ratio: 14.6:1
- Campus: Urban
- Colors: Green and Gold
- Athletics conference: Senate League
- Team name: Executives
- Accreditation: North Central Association of Colleges and Schools
- Yearbook: The Mirror
- Website: mycleschool.org/school/jane-addams-business-careers-center/

Jane Addams Business Careers Center often referred to as J.A.B.C.C. is one of six Career and Technical speciality schools within Cleveland Metropolitan School District (CMSD). It is known throughout the city for its exceptional student-operated restaurant, The Executive Grill. Visitors from throughout the city rave about the entrees and desserts, with their creme brulee being a proclaimed "the best in the city". Students apply and must be selected to attend Jane Addams. The school is named after Jane Addams, the first American Woman to win the Nobel Peace Prize (1931).

Jane Addams Business Careers Center is the only CMSD high school which has been recognized (as a high school, not an elementary-turned into a high school) by the State Department of Education as an Ohio School of Promise for seven consecutive years for meeting the state established goals in reading or math.

== History ==
Between 1920 and 1930 Cleveland Public Schools, now Cleveland Metropolitan School District, built 35 schools one of which was the Girls' Opportunity School which was built in 1924 and is the school that evolved into the current Jane Addams Business Careers Center. The programs offered were for young women who had difficulty with academic study. The school offered class work in cooking, hygiene, home nursing, English, and math. Girls' Opportunity School grew to an enrollment as high as 1,500 students over the next six years and changed its name to Jane Addams School.

Additional name changes followed: Jane Addams High School, Jane Addams Vocational High School and finally Jane Addams Business Careers Center. In addition, the all-girls school began admitting young men during the 1980s and added vocational classes leading to state certification in Dental Assisting, Cosmetology, Culinary Arts, Computer Repair, Finance and Credit, and Tailoring.

Originally part of the extensive vocational education program in Ohio, Jane Addams is now a Career and Technical school where students may pursue both college preparatory classes and technology based careers in computer science, business and culinary arts. In 2008, Design Lab Early College was opened within Jane Addams as a separate high school. Design Lab is an early college public high school with a focus on Art and Industrial Design.

=== Location change ===
Jane Addams High School was originally located at 6200 Euclid Avenue, which is now the site where Pierre's Ice Cream, a once local ice cream manufacturer, stands. Although In 1991 the original building was demolished when the property was acquired by Pierre's, in 1995 two members of the Jane Addams Alumni Association dedicated a cornerstone and a salvaged brick to be placed in an obelisk on the site where the original Girls Opportunity School, Jane Addams School, Jane Addams High School, and Jane Addams Vocational High School once stood.

Up until the fall of 1968, Jane Addams Vocational High School was located at 4940 Carnegie Avenue in Cleveland, Ohio. The building was designed by architect John Eisenmann in 1884. The building was originally called the Sibley School. The immense red brick school had 2 separate buildings which were connected to each other by a walkway and a tunnel (which students used to commute from one building to the other). Courses taught at this location on Carnegie Avenue included Fashion Studies: (tailoring, dressmaking, textiles studies, fashion illustration), Commercial Foods studies, Cosmetology, and Nursing. Jane Addams Vocational High School for Girls relocated in the fall of 1968 to their new building at the corner of East 30th and Community College Avenue in Cleveland, Ohio.

=== Honors and awards ===
From the 2001-2002 school year through 2006-2007, Jane Addams Business Careers Center has been named by the State of Ohio Department of Education as an Ohio School of Promise for meeting state set standards for reading.

In May 2008, Jane Addams was named to America's Best High Schools and awarded a Bronze Medal by U.S. News & World Report.

== Academics ==
Jane Addams offered a full of traditional academic college preparatory subjects in addition to post-secondary option classes, so students may earn both high school and college credit at the same time. In addition to a high school diploma, students receive a state certificate in the chosen career block, providing they meet the state standards and requirements for the individual discipline.

== Career and Technical Courses ==
=== Grade 9 ===
==== Business Technology Foundations ====
During their first year at Jane Addams the ninth grade students take business technology foundations which provides students with entry level computer skills required to enter business. Students will gain marketable skills that can be utilized in working toward advanced education. The training can lead to certification in IC3-Internet Core Computer Competencies.

At the end of their first year, students experience an intense week-long experience in each of the various career disciplines, select and prioritize their choice of career study for grades ten through twelve.

=== Grade 10-12 ===
Beginning the sophomore year, students spend as many as three forty-minute class periods within the career block they have chosen to study.

==== Business Administration Management ====
Business Administration Management (BAM) is designed for students interested in related data processing professions. Students receive instruction in keyboarding, data entry, accounting, flowchart logic and internet applications. Microsoft Word, Excel, Access, PowerPoint and automated accounting applications are integrated into the curriculum. This Tech Prep program provides an opportunity for 13 hours of college credit. Grades: 10, 11, 12

==== Cisco ====
Part of the Cisco Networking Academy the Network and Programing course at J.A.B.C.C. begins with Business Information Technology and Web Design, one year foundations course for this program. Students learn basic computer skills as well as Microsoft Word, Excel, PowerPoint, Access, and Web design. During the next two years, this program delivers web-based content, online assessment, student performance tracking, and preparation for industry standard certifications such as CCNA (Cisco Certified Network Associate). CCNA professionals can install, configure and operate LAN, WAN and dial access services. College credit can be earned by taking this program.

==== Culinary Arts ====
The Culinary Arts program at JABCC prepares students for today's workforce. The onsite student-operated restaurant, The Executive Grill, creates a real-life food service industry experience for the students. Emphasis is placed on a positive work ethic, professionalism, customer service, sanitation/safety, cooking and baking production. Each student during their three year job training education will work in the following capacities: Front-of-the-house service;To-go, fast food service; Back-of-the house prep and cooking stations; Buffet Specialty stations: Carving, Omlet, Flambe; Baking and pastry production; Sanitation/dishwashing/clean-up; Floater/roundsmen.

==== Marketing Technology ====
This program places emphasis on merchandising and financial principles. Students study sales, free enterprise and economic systems, advertising, marketing, human and customer relations, and financial math. These skills are applied to the worlds of entertainment; travel and tourism; e-commerce; international business; and management. Senior students participate in a cooperative training experience in local business. Grades: 10, 11, 12

==== Oracle ====
In the Oracle (Programming and Software Development) courses first year students take Business Information Technology and Web Design as a foundations course. Microsoft Word, Excel, PowerPoint, Access, and Web design make up the curriculum. During the following two years, the program, in partnership with the Oracle Corporation, provides educational opportunities in database fundamentals and programming. Students will learn data modeling for businesses, design and build the database structure, and become skilled in Java and SQL programming. Industry standard certification opportunities are available as well as opportunities to participate in international data modeling and Java competitions. Upon successful completion of this curriculum, students have an opportunity to earn up to 30 college credits. Grades: 10, 11, 12

==== Professional Administrative Technology ====
In Professional Administrative Technology student may choose a Legal or Medical focus. This program is designed for those students interested in careers in the legal and medical administrative fields. In the first year, students master legal terminology, legal documentation, computer skills, and general office procedures. Students learn the legal concepts of a trial by competing in the mock trial at the Justice Center. The introductory course in court reporting from Cuyahoga Community College may be included for college credit. In the second year, students study medical terminology, medical procedures medical coding and billing, and the accounting cycle. Professional ethics are stressed throughout the program. In the senior year, students choose to continue training in either legal or medical. Seniors are placed on internships by second semester. Students can earn up to 13 college credits by taking this series. Grades: 10, 11, 12

== The Executive Grille ==
=== The Restaurant and Menu ===
The Culinary Arts Program operates The Executive Grille Restaurant, a student-run, in-school restaurant, that is open to the public. Working in every possible role within the restaurant field, the students spend two hours of their day in an intern-like position gaining valuable work experience. Decorated in a sleek, modern style, The Executive Grille seats up to 85 and features an impressive menu of American Fare which includes special dishes created by the students in addition to appetizers, homemade soups, gourmet salads, gourmet pizzas, as well as featured entrees and of course 1/2 pound steakburgers and fries. In addition, international weeks feature entrees, desserts, and salads, that focus on the cuisine and culture of chosen nations.

=== Special Events and Fund Raisers ===
To help raise money to support the restaurant and program, culinary students sponsor three fund raisers throughout the year: at Thanksgiving, there is a pie and buffet sale; and the winter sale is a holiday cookie fundraiser. The buffet offer a wide variety of salads, entrees, and desserts. Students from Jane Addams' Culinary program have gone on to attend and graduate from some of the best culinary schools in the country.

== Extracurricular activities ==
Jane Addams Business Careers Center offers students the opportunity to participate in the following activities: Basketball, Bowling, Business Professionals of America, Cross Country, Cheerleading, Chess Club, Drill Team, Environmental Club, Golf, High Steppers, Intramurals, Key Club, Mediation Team, Mock Trial Team, Soccer, Student Council, Swimming, Tennis, Track, and Yearbook.
