= Max S. Hayes High School =

Location
- 2211 West 65th Street; Cleveland, Ohio 44102; United States
- Coordinates: 41°28′15″N 81°43′47″W

Information
- Type: Public, vocational
- Opened: 1950
- School district: Cleveland Metropolitan School District
- Principal: Derek Patterson
- Teaching staff: 40.00 (FTE)
- Grades: 9-12
- Student to teacher ratio: 15.28
- Colors: Royal blue and white
- Athletics conference: Senate League
- Team name: Lakers
- Accreditation: North Central Association of Colleges and Schools
- Website: School website

Max S. Hayes High School is a public high school located in Cleveland, Ohio, United States. It is part of the Cleveland Metropolitan School District. The school is a career training school with several vocational and career-based programs, otherwise known as a trade school. Students can go there to learn a trade. The current location on West 65th Street opened in August 2015, replacing the previous facility on Detroit Avenue, which opened in 1957.

== Name ==
Max S. Hayes High School is named in honor of Max S. Hayes, a longtime Cleveland newspaper editor, labor activist, and 1920 vice presidential candidate of the Farmer-Labor Party.

The school was also the first home for public television station WVIZ, which was launched by CMSD.

== Notable alumni ==
- Frank G. Jackson, Mayor of Cleveland
