= Reed v. Rhodes =

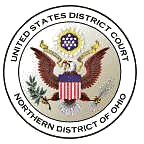
- Court: United States District Court for the Northern District of Ohio
- Decided: March 27, 1998
- Docket nos.: 1:73 CV 1300
- Citation: 1 F. Supp. 2d 705

Keywords
- Racial segregation

Reed v. Rhodes is a United States District Court for the Northern District of Ohio decision which ruled for the desegregation of the Cleveland Metropolitan School District in Cleveland, Ohio. The case was first settled in 1976, with an amendment in 1981 and with a final decision in 1998.

== Background ==
Lawyers with the NAACP sued the Cleveland Public Schools and the State of Ohio in 1973 on the grounds of racial segregation violating Brown v. Board of Education. In 1976, Judge Frank J. Battisti held that Ohio and the Cleveland Public Schools intentionally created and maintained a segregated school system, violating the 14th amendment of Robert Anthony Reed III and other schoolchildren in the district. A remedial plan was issued in February 1978 to remove statewide segregation. In 1981, the case was reviewed again by Judge Frank J. Battisti, which amended the fees for which the State of Ohio and Cleveland Public Schools were held liable.

The Cleveland Public Schools remained under court supervision until July 1, 2000.
