= East High School (Cleveland) =

Location
- 1349 East 79th Street; Cleveland, (Cuyahoga County), Ohio 44103; United States; 41°31′8″N 81°37′57″W

Information
- Type: Public, Coeducational high school
- Opened: 1900
- Status: Closed
- Closed: June 10, 2010
- Grades: 9-12
- Colors: Blue and Gold
- Athletics conference: Senate League
- Mascot: Blue Bombers
- Team name: Blue Bombers
- Website: https://web.archive.org/web/20090815024823/http://www.cmsdnet.net/

East High School was a public high school in Cleveland, Ohio, a part of the Cleveland Metropolitan School District operating from 1900 until 2010. Their nickname was the Blue Bombers, and they competed in the Senate League as a member school of the Ohio High School Athletic Association.

== History ==
East High School was opened in 1900, serving students grades 9-12.

East High School's gymnasium suffered a roof collapse in 2000, injuring 5 people which triggered Cleveland's School District to renovate the school.

East High school closed following the 2009-10 school year, citing declining enrollment and budget issues. The school was repurposed in 2013 and reopened as the East Professional Center, housing CMSD offices and training programs.

== Ohio High School Athletic Association State Championships ==
- Boys Cross Country – 1956

== Notable alumni ==
- Hart Crane
- Arthur Matsu - Professional football player.
- Harlan Ellison - Writer
