= James Cotton (gridiron football) =

American gridiron football player (born 1976)

No. 99
- Position: Defensive end

Personal information
- Born: November 7, 1976 (age 49); Cleveland, Ohio, U.S.

Career information
- High school: Collinwood (Cleveland, Ohio)
- College: Ohio State University
- NFL draft: 2000: 7th round, 223rd overall pick

Career history
- New York/New Jersey Hitmen (2001); Calgary Stampeders (2001–2002); Buffalo Bills (2002); Atlanta Falcons (2003); Hamilton Tiger-Cats (2005–2006)

Awards and highlights
- Grey Cup champion (2001)

James Antwane Cotton (born November 7, 1976) is a former American and Canadian football defensive end, who played in both the Canadian Football League (CFL) and National Football League (NFL).

James Cotton was born in Cleveland, Ohio, United States to James Graham and Catherine Cotton. He lettered in football, basketball, baseball at Collinwood High School. Cotton earned all-state honours in football and baseball and All-American honours in football.

Cotton is the founder of the Buck-Icon Foundation. Its mission is to provide resources for former members of the Ohio State football program to enhance their careers on a variety of different levels and provide programs that will help them transition into professional life in Corporate America, Athletics, Society, and the Community.

Cotton received an Associate of Arts degree from City College of San Francisco and The Ohio State University awarded him a bachelor's degree in Sociology. As a Junior, Cotton was an instrumental part of the Buckeyes Big Ten Championship and Sugar Bowl Victory over Texas A&M in 1998. During his senior season in 1999, Cotton was voted by his coaches as the team's Most Outstanding Lineman by leading the team in sacks and tackles for loss. "My most memorable moment was being the last player sack Tom Brady Twice in the Big House".

In 2000, Cotton was drafted in the NFL by the Chicago Bears in the seventh round with the 223rd overall pick and played one year of professional football with no game action or career stats in the NFL. He had stops in Atlanta Falcons, Buffalo Bills, and the Canadian Football League (2001 Grey Cup Champion). A native of Cleveland, Ohio, Cotton is the father of his daughters, Kierra Cotton and Veronica Snyder. Son of Catherine Cotton and James Graham.
