= Mifflin High School =

Location
- 3245 Oak Spring Street; Columbus, Ohio 43219; United States
- Coordinates: 40°2′21″N 82°55′24″W

Information
- Type: Public, coeducational
- School district: Columbus City Schools
- Principal: Joseph Krabill
- Teaching staff: 44.00 (FTE)
- Grades: 9–12
- Student to teacher ratio: 16.55
- Colors: Blue and white
- Fight song: Let’s go Punchers
- Athletics conference: Columbus City League
- Mascot: Cowpuncher
- Team name: Punchers
- Rival: Northland High School
- Accreditation: Ohio Department of Education
- Website: ccsoh.us/MifflinHS

Mifflin High School is a public high school located on the northeast side of Columbus, Ohio. It has been part of Columbus City Schools since the early 1970s. The building located at 3265 Oak Spring St., Columbus, OH was built in 1977. Previously it was a separate school district. The original high school was located at 3000 Agler Rd in Columbus and is now Mifflin Middle School.

The school colors are blue and white with gray and black as unofficial colors. The official school nickname is the "Cowpunchers," but the local media has shorted the nickname to the "Punchers."

== Battle of the North ==
Back in 2013, before Brookhaven High School was closed permanently due to low attendance, Mifflin versus Brookhaven was a football rivalry that would be played at the end of each season. The schools are approximately 4.9 mi away and were basically separated by Westerville Road. That last game would always decide who the “King of the North” was. Once that was no longer happening, in 2014 at the end of the season they played Whetstone, which isn't considered a “rivalry,” but is Mifflin's City League North foe. Mifflin developed a lot of rivalries within their division which include Beechcroft High School and Northland High School which are predominantly played in the middle of the season back to back. Beechcroft was also Brookhaven's rival also. Beechcroft and Brookhaven are exactly 3.8 mi apart, which made the rivalry more intense. Once Brookhaven closed most of the students that attended were transferred to Mifflin. Then came “The Battle of the North” between Beechcroft and Mifflin, and also Northland and Mifflin. The reason why it's named this is because usually whoever ends up winning each “Battle” is crowned the “King” of the City League North. Meaning whoever wins is more than likely going to win the City League North.

== State championships ==
- Boys track and field - 1975, 1979
- Girls track and field - 1982
