= Richmond Heights High School =

Richmond Heights Secondary School

Location
- 447 Richmond Road; Richmond Heights, (Cuyahoga County), Ohio 44143; United States
- Coordinates: 41°33′16″N 81°29′42″W

Information
- Type: Public, Coeducational high school
- School district: Richmond Heights Local Schools
- Superintendent: Dr. Marnisha R. Brown
- Principal: Shaun Lodge
- Teaching staff: 18.10 (FTE)
- Grades: 9-12
- Student to teacher ratio: 16.52
- Colors: Royal Blue & White
- Slogan: It's the Dawning of a New Day
- Athletics conference: Chagrin Valley Conference
- Sports: softball, baseball, basketball, volleyball, and football
- Mascot: SPARTY
- Nickname: The Spartans
- Team name: Spartans
- Website: richmondheightsschools.org

Richmond Heights High School is a public high school located in Richmond Heights, Ohio, southeast of Cleveland, Ohio. It is the only high school in the Richmond Heights School District. It has a student body of 335 and a student-teacher ratio of 17:1. Its mascot is the Spartan and its colors are royal blue and white. The school's designations in the recent years: "excellent" in 2006–2007, "effective" in 2007–2008, "effective" in 2008–2009. (There are six academic designations in Ohio: excellent with distinction, excellent, effective, continuous improvement, academic watch, academic emergency.)

== Ohio High School Athletic Association State Championships ==
- Boys Basketball - 2022, 2023, 2024
- Wrestling - 1979,1980,1983,1984
