= Troy Christian High School =

Location
- 700 S Dorset Rd; Troy, Ohio 45373 U.S.
- Coordinates: 40°02′06″N 84°13′46″W

Information
- School type: Private
- Motto: The heart of education is the education of the heart
- Denomination: Inter-denominational Christian
- Established: 1980
- School district: Troy Christian Schools
- Superintendent: Gary C. Wilber
- Enrollment: 354
- Color
- Athletics: Football, soccer, cross country, golf, volleyball, basketball, swimming, wrestling, baseball, softball, track
- Athletics conference: Metro Buckeye Conference
- Mascot: Eagles
- Annual tuition: $8,951 (high school)
- Website: www.troychristianschools.org/academics/jr-highhigh-school

Troy Christian High School is a private, Christian high school in Troy, Ohio. It is a part of Troy Christian Schools, which offers education from Pre-K through 12th grade. Their mascot is the Eagle and their colors are forest green and royal gold.

Troy Christian Schools was founded in 1980 and remained a Pre-K through eighth grade program until 1996. A ninth grade class was added in 1996 in partnership with Dayton Christian Schools. An additional grade level was added each subsequent year. The first 12th grade class of 32 students graduated in 2000. The building currently housing the junior high and high school was constructed in 1996. The School offers academic courses and includes PSEO and dual enrollment from Mount Vernon Nazarene University, Urbana University, Edison State Community College, and Indiana Wesleyan University, in which ninety-six percent of students currently participate. The average ACT score for the class of 2009 was 27.1, well above the national average of 20.0. In addition, ninety-nine percent of students continue with their education post high school, through the military or a four-year college.

Troy Christian won their first-ever Ohio High School Athletic Association (OHSAA) State Championship on March 3, 2007. They repeated as champions on March 1, 2008, and again on March 7, 2009, and again on March 2, 2013. The wrestling program was the underdog going into every state tournament but prided themselves on pulling through under pressure, winning their 2009 title by a mere 1/2 point. Troy Christian wrestling was considered a powerhouse in division three from 2006 to 2010. On a national scale, The Eagles won the AAU Disney duals competing and beating some of the best high schools teams in the country. Troy Christian wrestling was additionally featured in USA Today's top 25 high school programs in America, they climbed to as high as number ten in the nation while on the list. Many Troy Christian wrestlers have gone on to pursue college wrestling at Missouri, West Point, Bucknell, Ohio State, Findlay, and Ohio Northern. After three years of success, coaches Steve Goudy and Randy Thome stepped down to focus more on their families. Ty Morgan, a 3x state champion for Graham High School and a Central Michigan graduate, is the new coach.

== Publications ==
- TCS Outlook

== Ohio High School Athletic Association State Championships ==
- Boys Wrestling – 2007, 2008, 2009, 2013
