= Martin Luther King Jr. High School (Cleveland) =

Martin Luther King Jr. High School Health Careers Center

Location
- 1651 East 71st Street; Cleveland, Ohio; Cleveland, (Cuyahoga County), Ohio 44103; United States; 41°30′35″N 81°38′20″W

Information
- Type: Public, Coeducational high school
- Motto: "We are tied to Greatness"
- Opened: 1973
- Closed: 2020
- School district: CMSD
- Superintendent: Eric Gordon
- President: Latonia Davis
- Grades: 9-12
- Average class size: 25
- Colors: Black and Teal
- Song: The Show Goes On by Lupe Fiasco
- Athletics conference: Senate League
- Sports: Basketball, Bowling, Cross Country, Soccer, Tennis, and Track and field,
- Mascot: Knight
- Nickname: MLK
- Team name: Crusaders
- Rival: Collinwood
- Accreditation: North Central Association of Colleges and Schools
- Website: http://www.cmsdnet.net

Martin Luther King Jr. High School was a public high school located in Cleveland, Ohio serving the Hough neighborhood. It was part of the Cleveland Metropolitan School District. The school nickname is "King."

== History ==
The school, built in 1971, was designed by Ohio’s first African American-owned architectural firm, Robert P. Madison International, Inc. It was built on land that was once home to many apartments that were burned in the Hough Riots of July 1966 in an area nicknamed "Little Hollywood" during Prohibition. Like many schools that opened in the 10 years after the 1968 assassination of Martin Luther King Jr., the school was named in honor of the famed civil rights movement leader.

In 2019, the Cleveland Metropolitan School District school board voted unanimously to consolidate Glenville and Martin Luther King Jr. High School at an improved Glenville High School, which is also a Black east side school.

In 2021, Structures Unlimited LLC won a bid from the district to acquire the school for $880,000. They proposed a project to transform the site into two apartment buildings with ground-floor retail spaces including an organic grocery store and a restaurant. They also proposed a three-acre community park and many other residential units.

== Structure ==
The school has two "Small Schools" located in it, providing focused learning for students interested in the medical and law industry. The classes use hands-on experiences to prepare teens for college in these fields:

- Health Careers. Health Careers offers programs in STNA, Dental Assisting, and Personal Training.
- School for Law & Municipal Careers. Law & Municipal offers programs in Security forces, Firefighting, and EMT.
