= John Hay High School =

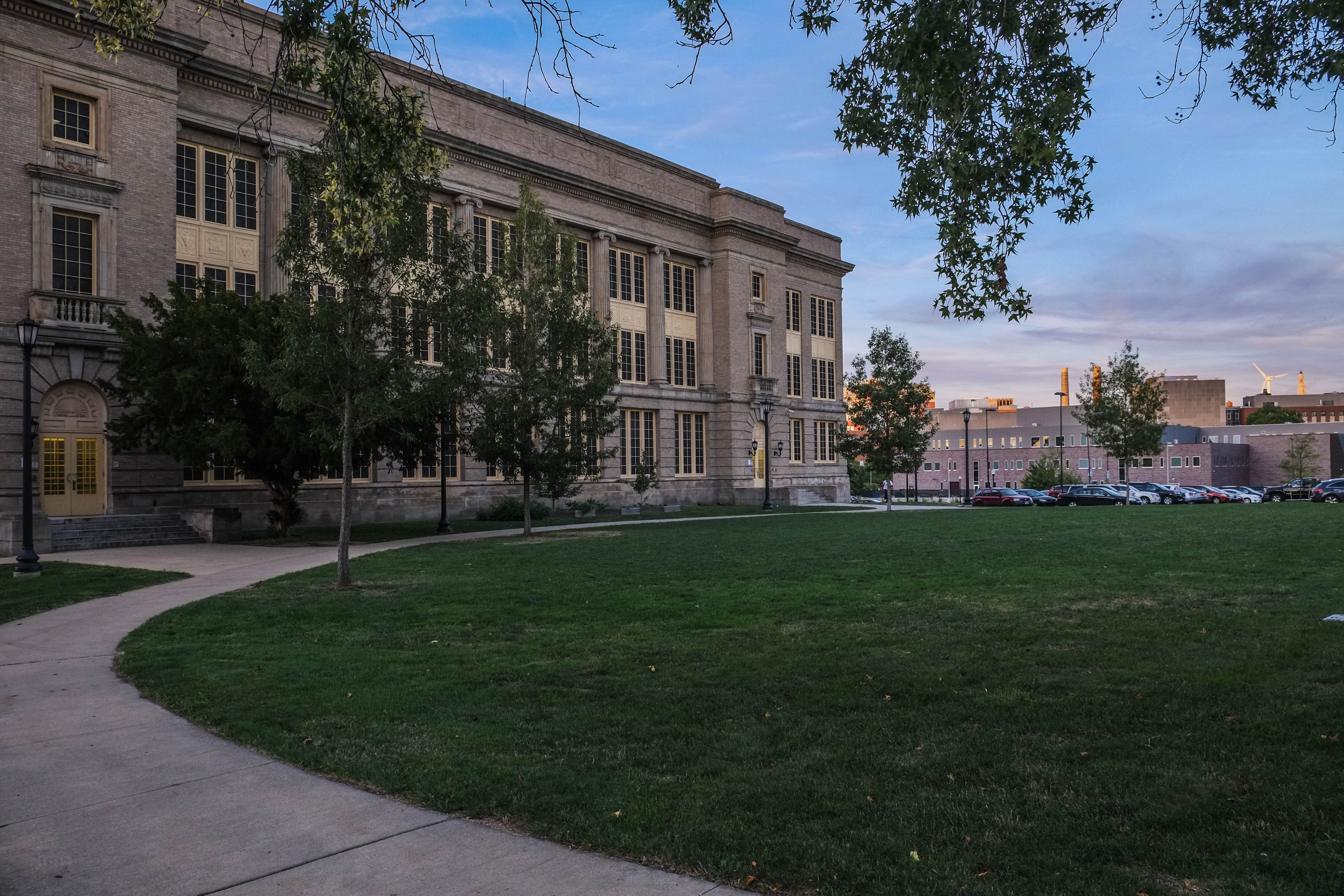
- John Hay High School, October 2012

Location
- 2075 Stokes Boulevard; Cleveland, (Cuyahoga County), Ohio 44106; United States; 41°30′7″N 81°36′43″W

Information
- Type: Public, Coeducational high school
- Opened: 1929, 2006
- School district: Cleveland Metropolitan School District
- Superintendent: Eric Gordon
- Principal: Michelle Perez, Chaundria Smith, Tianna Maxey
- Grades: 9-12
- Colors: Green and Gold
- Slogan: Create Explore Innovate
- Athletics conference: Senate League
- Mascot: Hornets
- Team name: Hornets
- USNWR ranking: 1
- Athletic Director: Karen Gnabah-Mortensen
- Website: http://www.cmsdnet.net

John Hay High School — also known as the John Hay Campus — is a public high school located in Cleveland, Ohio. John Hay is part of the Cleveland Metropolitan School District, with grade levels including 9th through 12th. The neoclassical school was designed by Cleveland Schools architect George Hopkinson, and was built in 1929. John Hay had undergone a complete renovation in July 2003 and opened back up in Fall 2006 with more than 200,000 sq ft (19,000 m^{2}) of learning space. The school is located in Cleveland's centrally located University Circle district, near Case Western Reserve University.

John Hay High School completed renovations in the 2006–2007 school year and is the home of three small schools: the Cleveland Early College High School (2002), the Cleveland School of Science and Medicine (2006), and the Cleveland School of Architecture and Design (2006). The school is named for John Hay, the former U.S. Secretary of State and part-time Cleveland resident.

== Clubs and Activities ==
John Hay HS's Latin Club functions as a local chapter of both the Ohio Junior Classical League (OJCL) and National Junior Classical League (NJCL). In the Cleveland School of Architecture and Design there is a program called ACE. ACE stands for Architects, Construction, & Engineering and consists of people from around Cleveland who work in those fields coming to John Hay Campus on Tuesdays & Thursdays and mentoring 11th and 12th graders. The students complete projects that have been predetermined for them that relate to all three concepts and present them to the school districts CEO, the Mayor and other family and friends. At the end of a students 12th grade year if they are still in the program and have performed well the will receive a scholarship. John Hay's boys varsity basketball team were the 2010-11 Senate Champions. They were later defeated by Akron's St. Vincent- St. Mary on the road to the State Championship. The school also has an Environmental Club which has its own vegetable garden and recycling program which meets on Tuesdays; and a Poetry Club which meets on Mondays - both of which are on the Early College Floor.

== Ohio High School Athletic Association State Championships ==
- Wrestling - 1938, 1939, 1940, 1941, 1943

== Notable alumni ==
=== Athletics ===
- Wesley Carroll, NFL player
- Anthony Hancock, retired NFL wide receive
- John Hicks, retired NFL Player, College Football Hall of Famer
- Madeline Manning, 800m Olympic Gold Medalist, 1968
- Tim McGee, retired NFL wide receiver
- Charles Oakley, retired NBA forward, city street "Charles Oakley Way" in his honor
- Ruben Patterson, NBA forward
