= Whitney M. Young Gifted & Talented Leadership Academy =

Pre-K-8 in Cleveland, Ohio, US

Whitney M. Young School

Location
- 17900 Harvard Avenue; Cleveland, (Cuyahoga County), Ohio 44128; United States; 41°26′57″N 81°33′10″W

Information
- School type: Public, K-8
- Motto: Dedicated to Excellence in Education formerly Aspire, Achieve, Apply
- Established: 1971; 55 years ago
- School district: Cleveland Metropolitan School District
- Superintendent: Warren Morgan
- School code: 062323
- CEEB code: 365-772
- Principal: Carlisha Bias
- Teaching staff: 18.01 (FTE) (2018–19)
- Grades: K-8
- Gender: Co-educational
- Enrollment: 148 (2018–19)
- Student to teacher ratio: 8.22:1 (2018–19)
- Campus: Urban
- Colors: Black and Gold
- Mascot: Warriors
- Nickname: WMY
- Accreditation: Ohio Department of Education
- Newspaper: The Whitney Word
- Website: young.clevelandmetroschools.org

Whitney M. Young School (formerly known as Whitney Young Gifted Education Campus, Whitney Young High School or Whitney M. Young Gifted & Talented Leadership Academy) is a selective-enrollment public school in Cleveland, in the U.S. state of Ohio, notable as the city's first public gifted and talented school.. Named after Whitney M. Young Jr., a prominent civil rights leader, the school is located in Cleveland's Lee-Harvard neighborhood.

Whitney Young is less than a half-mile from John F. Kennedy High School. Located in the city's southeast corner, it is less than a half-mile from the Cleveland - Warrensville Heights and Cleveland - Shaker Heights borders. During the 2008–2009 school year Whitney Young served 16% of CMSD gifted students.

The school has scored among the top high schools in the state of Ohio. In May 2009, Whitney Young was featured on Channel 3 News in Cleveland for begin just one of four Cleveland schools to have a 100% graduation rate. That same year, the school was ranked among the top high schools in the United States by U.S. News & World Report. On August 27, 2010, Whitney Young became the first and only Cleveland school to receive the state's highest rating of Excellent with Distinction. Whitney Young is currently listed on Ohio's Schools of Promise List, it has been on the list for 9 consecutive school years, starting in school year 2001–2002. Whitney Young has been listed as an Ohio School of Promise more than any other school in the state.

== History ==
In 2007 Whitney Young became one of two middle schools in Cleveland to take part in the Rotsky Foundation. This program allows selected eighth grade students to participate in a mentoring program, and receive a scholarship in their senior year to any college/university. The students will remain in the program until they complete high school, regardless if they remain in the Cleveland Metropolitan School District or not.

Whitney Young's 2008–2009 school year was a dedication to Reginald Lamont Dudley Jr., a 13-year-old (Whitney Young Eighth Grader) who was murdered October 4, 2008, in his home.

In December 2011, the State of Ohio Department of Education released the first ever ranking of all Ohio schools. Whitney Young ranked third in CMSD and 180th in the state.

In 2019, the gifted and talented high school program of Whitney Young was transferred to the newly built John F. Kennedy High School, despite much protest and outrage from parents, students, and alumni. The years long protest was involved demonstrations and calling of local and state representative to change the plans laid out by CMSD Leadership and some student walkouts.

=== Name changes ===
The school building that is now home to Whitney Young was opened in 1951 as Hoban Dominican High School, an all-girls Catholic School. In 1971 the Cleveland Metropolitan School District (formally Cleveland Municipal School District) brought the school from the Cleveland Diocese. When the Cleveland Municipal School District first opened Whitney Young in 1971 (a few months after the death of Whitney Young, who died March 11, 1971), it was an all-girls school.

- 1973-1974 School year—school opened as Whitney M. Young Junior High School
- 2003-2004 School year—name changed to Whitney M. Young School
- 2008-2009 School year—name changed to Whitney M. Young High School
- 2010-2011 School year—name changed to Whitney M. Young Gifted & Talented Leadership Academy
- 2019-2020 School year—name changed to Whitney M. Young School

=== Grade-level changes ===
In the 2003–2004 school year the Cleveland Municipal School District begin adding one additional grade level to Whitney Young until reaching grade 12. Whitney Young's first high school graduating class was the Class of 2007 with former principal Alisa McKinnie. In June 2009 Whitney Young held its first eighth grade promotion (Class of 2013) since it added secondary courses to the school in 2003.

- 1973-1974 School year—school opened with grades 7-8
- 2003-2004 School year— changed to grades 6-9
- 2004-2005 School year— changed to grades 6-10
- 2005-2006 School year— changed to grades 6-11
- 2006-2007 School year— changed to grades 6-12
- 2010-2011 School year— changed to grades 2-12
- 2019-2020 School year— changed to grades K-8

=== Cleveland Schools Transformation Plan 2010 ===
The Transformation Plan that was announced on Tuesday, January 5, 2010, categorized Whitney Young as a Growth School. This plan called for major changes throughout the Cleveland Metropolitan School District. Growth Schools are schools that are showing the strongest absolute academic performance or strong improvement trends. These schools will be provided the autonomy and support they need to continue to improve student outcomes, with a strong expectation for continued growth. This plan also called to close Gracemount School, which is less than two miles from Whitney Young. Gracemount served gifted students in grades K-8, but ranked in Academic Emergency. With Gracemount closing, their students in grades 2-8 labeled gifted will be sent to Whitney Young effective the 2010–2011 school year. As part of the Transformation Whitney Young would begin serving grades 2-12 effective the 2010–2011 school year.

CMSD hosted a Transformation Community Meeting for Whitney Young on Wednesday, January 6, 2010, at John F. Kennedy High School. Parents, staff, community members and students were welcome and encouraged to attend the meeting. Whitney Young's Principal Karen Byron-Johnson informed parents about the district's plans for Whitney Young in the coming weeks and school year.

CMSD Board voted on the plan on March 9, 2010, and approved it.

== Academics ==
Whitney Young consistently ranks in the top of the state in terms of test scores and attendance rate. The school offers numerous Honors and Advanced Placement courses for students in grades 7-12 and Gifted & Talented courses for students in grades 2–6. Advanced Placement is offered for Physics, English, European History, Environmental Science, Statistics and Calculus. Honors courses are: Algebra, Geometry, Pre-Calculus, World History, American History, American Government, Street law, Spanish, Physical Science, Biology, Chemistry, English, Creative Writing, Poetry, and French. As of the 2010-2011 school year, Whitney Young only offers Physical Education, Health, Band, Choir, Art, Drawing & Painting, African-American History, Senior Seminar and OGT Math & OGT Science as regular course work. The school requires all high school students to take academic electives, honors and Advanced Placement courses.

== Building ==
As part of the Cleveland Metropolitan School District continuing modernization program, paid for with state funds and proceeds from a local bond issue, Whitney Young's original building was demolished and rebuilt in 2019, with a ribbon-cutting ceremony on September 6, 2019. The new Whitney Young features large, interactive touch screens in every classroom and community, or “extended,” learning areas where children can work on projects in teams. Furniture is comfortable and can be arranged for group work. The building supports the school's new instructional strategy, known as personalized learning technology. Students use a project-based approach to pose, research and answer their own questions.

Prior to demolition, Whitney Young was formerly composed of two buildings, the 'Main Building' (High School) and the 'Annex' connected by a tunnel.

=== Main Building ===
The Main Building is the front building of the school. The Office, Principal's Office, Cafeteria, Gymnasium, high school/ main Media Center, high school/ main Computer Lab and Auditorium are all located within the Main Building. All visitors must enter in this building before proceeding to the Annex or anywhere throughout the school.

==== High school ====
All high school students classes are located in the Main Building, known as the "High School". Some high school students take an art class in the Annex, this however is the only time high schoolers are in the annex. High School students switch classes just as every other high school, all classes are 50 minutes including lunch periods.

=== Tunnel and Annex ===
The tunnel is an extended brick wall walkway between the Main Building and the Annex. The tunnel contains lockers for Junior High students. The Annex is the back building of Whitney Young, it contains The Assistant Principal's Office, Grades 2-8 Media Center and Grades 2-8 Computer Lab. All rooms in this building is distinguished with an "A" at the end (EX: Room 208A, Room 303A, 214A)

==== Elementary ====
All Elementary students classes are in the "Annex". There is one class per grade level for students in grades 2–5. Students remain in these classes all day, with the exception for Breakfast, Lunch, Physical Education and Music classes which are located in the high school.

==== Junior High/ Middle School ====
All Junior High students classes are also located in the Annex. There are typically two-three classes per grade level for students in grades 6–8. Students switch classes throughout the day (with 50 minute periods) and remain in the Annex with the exceptions of Foreign Language Classes, Lunch, Breakfast, Gym, Music, and Band which are located in the high school.

== 2010 State Report Card ==
On August 27, 2010, Ohio Department of Education released the 2009–2010 school year report cards for both schools and districts across The State of Ohio. Cleveland Metropolitan School District's CEO Eugene Sanders held a press conference at Whitney Young to announce that the district as a whole has received a rating of Continuous Improvement (C average) on the state report card (up from the previous year D average). The press conference also revealed that Whitney Young was rated Excellent with Distinction, the highest rating possible to receive (the first and only Cleveland school to receive this rating). Whitney Young's principal Karen Byron-Johnson spoke briefly about how she and her students reached their goal in such a low performing district. While CEO Eugene Sanders was quoted saying "You can go to Shaker Heights, Solon, Beachwood, you can go to any other school in the state, and none of them have performed better than Whitney Young students.

== Effective Leadership Academy ==
Effective Leadership Academy, also known as ELA, is a non-profit 501(3)c organization that was founded in 2008 by Flo Brett. ELA works with Northeast Ohio schools to provide a dynamic, results-based youth leadership program for students in grades six through twelve. The ELA's mission is to help young people turn their potential into performance by developing their most valuable asset – themselves. This innovative, "inside out" self-development process focuses on three critical elements: personal leadership, healthy behaviors, and interpersonal skills. During the 2010–2011 school year WMY teamed up with Effective Leadership Academy and Cleveland Leadership Center to deliver a leadership training program to 30 WMY seniors from the Class of 2011. Their once a week senior seminar, delivered by ELA focuses on leadership and character-building skills. The ELA program returned to WMY during the 2011–12 school year to work with 15 seniors from the Class of 2012, the group met twice a week for fifty minutes each session.

== Controversy ==
On Thursday, November 11, 2010, two freshman students were forced by other students into the trunk of a car which drove around the school parking lot. One boy was injured attempting to escape he was treated and released from Hospital. Four students from the school were arrested and charged with felonious assault, abduction and hazing. Cleveland Metropolitan School District Humanware Division sent crisis counselors along with members of the CMSD Anti-Bullying Team to counsel students and remind them of their rights and responsibilities.

== Extracurricular activities ==
Students playing on Whitney Young sports are commonly referred to as Lady Warriors (girls) and Warriors (boys). Whitney Young offers few sports compared to other high schools in Cleveland. Whitney Young is classified in the city's extramural division (until conclusion of 2011–2012 school year). Effective the 2012–2013 school year Whitney Young sports were moved in the Senate League. Whitney Young currently offers:

=== High school ===
- Boys' football
- Boys' basketball
- Girls' basketball
- Girls' Volleyball
- Cheerleading
- Hi-Steppers
- Chess
- Website Club
- Co-Ed Track
- Co-ed bowling
- Band
- Class officers
- Student Government
- Class representatives
- National Honor Society (sophomores, juniors and seniors only)
- Yearbook staff
- Peer mediation
- Y.E.T.T - A Christian student leadership team
- Gospel choir
- Toys for Tots
- Effective Leadership Academy (ELA) (seniors only)
- Cleveland Institute (CI) (sophomores, juniors and seniors only)
- Volunteer and community service

=== Middle school ===
- Boys' Basketball
- Girls' Basketball
- Girls' Volleyball
- Band
- Choir
- After-school Tutoring
- Class Representatives (Grades 7 & 8 only)
- National Junior Honor Society
- Poetry Club
- Peer Mediation
- Gospel choir
- Drama Club

=== Elementary ===
- After School Tutoring

=== Other ===
- Whitney Young also offers Special Olympics track, basketball and bowling for students in special education classes.

In October 2009 the high school Lady Warriors Volleyball team won their fourth consecutive championship game, going undefeated for three consecutive years; with Coach Paul Baker. The middle school Lady Warriors Volleyball team came in second place; with Coach Debra White.

On February 11, 2010, and February 10, 2011, Whitney Young boys' high-school basketball team lost the championship game against Ginn Academy at John Adams. March 4, 2010, Whitney Young girls' high-school basketball team lose the championship game against Cleveland School of the Arts at John F. Kennedy.

== Honors and awards ==
Awards/ Honors
| Award | Number of Awards | Year |
|---|---|---|
| "Blue Ribbon Honors School of Excellence". | 1 | 1998 |
| Ohio's Top Middle Schools List | 6 | 2006, 2007, 2008, 2009, 2010, 2012 |
| Ohio's Top High Schools List | 7 | 2005, 2006, 2007, 2008, 2009, 2010, 2012 |
| America's Best High Schools | 5 | 2008, 2009, 2010, 2011, 2012 |
| Cleveland Cavaliers Head of the Class (English Teacher Debra White) | 1 | 2010 |
| Ohio School of Promise. | 10 | 2001, 2002, 2003, 2004, 2005, 2006, 2007, 2008, 2009, 2010 |
| State Report Card Rating of "Effective" | 6 | 2003, 2004, 2005, 2006, 2007, 2008 |
| State Report Card Rating of "Excellent | 2 | 2009, 2012 |
| State Report Card Rating of "Excellent with Distinction" | 2 | 2010, 2011 |
| Cleveland Bar Association Mock Trial | 1 | 2012 |
| Power of the Pen Writing Symposium | 2 | 2012 |
| Stop The Hate Writing Contest Semi-Finalist Award Winner through The Maltz Museum | 1 | 2012 |
| Original Song Writing Series through The Maltz Museum Roots of American Music | 1 | 2013 |
| Total | 45 | |

=== Sports/activities ===
Championships
| Season | Sport | Number of Championships | Year |
|---|---|---|---|
| Fall | Chess | 3 | 2008, 2009, 2010 |
| Fall | High School Volleyball | 4 | 2006, 2007, 2008, 2009 |
| Winter | High School Basketball, Boys' | 2 | 2006, 2007 |
| Winter | Middle School Basketball, Boys' | 3 | 2006, 2007, 2008 |
| Spring | High School Basketball, Girls | 6 | 2006, 2007, 2008, 2009, 2011, 2012 |
| Spring | Hi-Steppers | 1 | 2006 |
| Spring | Track | 3 | 2009, 2010, 2012 |
| Spring | Total | 21 | |

== See also ==
- Whitney Young Magnet High School—Chicago
- Whitney Young—Civil Rights Leader
