= Cleveland School of the Arts =

Public high school in Cleveland, Ohio, United States

Location
- 2064 Sterns Road; Cleveland, (Cuyahoga County), Ohio 44106; United States

Information
- Type: Public, Coeducational high school
- Established: 1981
- School district: Cleveland Metropolitan School District
- Superintendent: Eric Gordon
- Area trustee: Felton Thomas, President, CSA Board of Trustees
- Head of school: Ricardo Franklin Sr.
- Grades: 9–12
- Colors: Black and Silver
- Sports: Boys' and Girls' Basketball
- Mascot: panther
- Nickname: CSA
- Team name: Stars
- Rival: Whitney Young
- Accreditation: North Central Association of Colleges and Schools
- Website: www.clevelandschoolofthearts.org

Cleveland School of the Arts (CSA) is a public high school serving grades 9–12. It is located in University Circle, the cultural center of Cleveland, Ohio, surrounded by an extensive artistic community. It is the only fully infused academic and arts High School of the Cleveland Metropolitan School District. The school opened in 1981. Cleveland School of the Arts consists of artistic classes in Dance, Interdisciplinary Arts, Literary Arts, Music (Band, Orchestra, Vocal) Theater, and the Visual Arts (Drawing, Photography).

== Relocation to new site ==
The new 21st century arts facility opened in August, 2015 for the 2015–2016 school year. The new Cleveland School of the Arts is located on the original CSA site at 2064 Stearns Road in the Heart of University Circle. The grand opening ribbon cutting ceremony occurred on October 24, 2015.

== Arts ==
Cleveland School of the Arts offers several different majors: Dance, Interdisciplinary Arts, Literary Arts, Music: Band, Orchestra, and Vocal, Theater, Visual Arts: Drawing and Photography. All students must audition to attend.

== Academics ==
Cleveland School of the Arts artist scholars excel in academics: 99% graduation rate with 100% attending institutions of higher learning. Cleveland School of the Arts students have high attendance rates, OGT and OAT test scores.

== Notable alumni ==
- Jason Champion Men At Large (1991)
- Avant-R&B singer/songwriter (1995)
- Stephanie Howse- Ohio State Representative 11th District (1997)
- Conya Doss R&B singer/teacher
