= Delta High School (Ohio) =

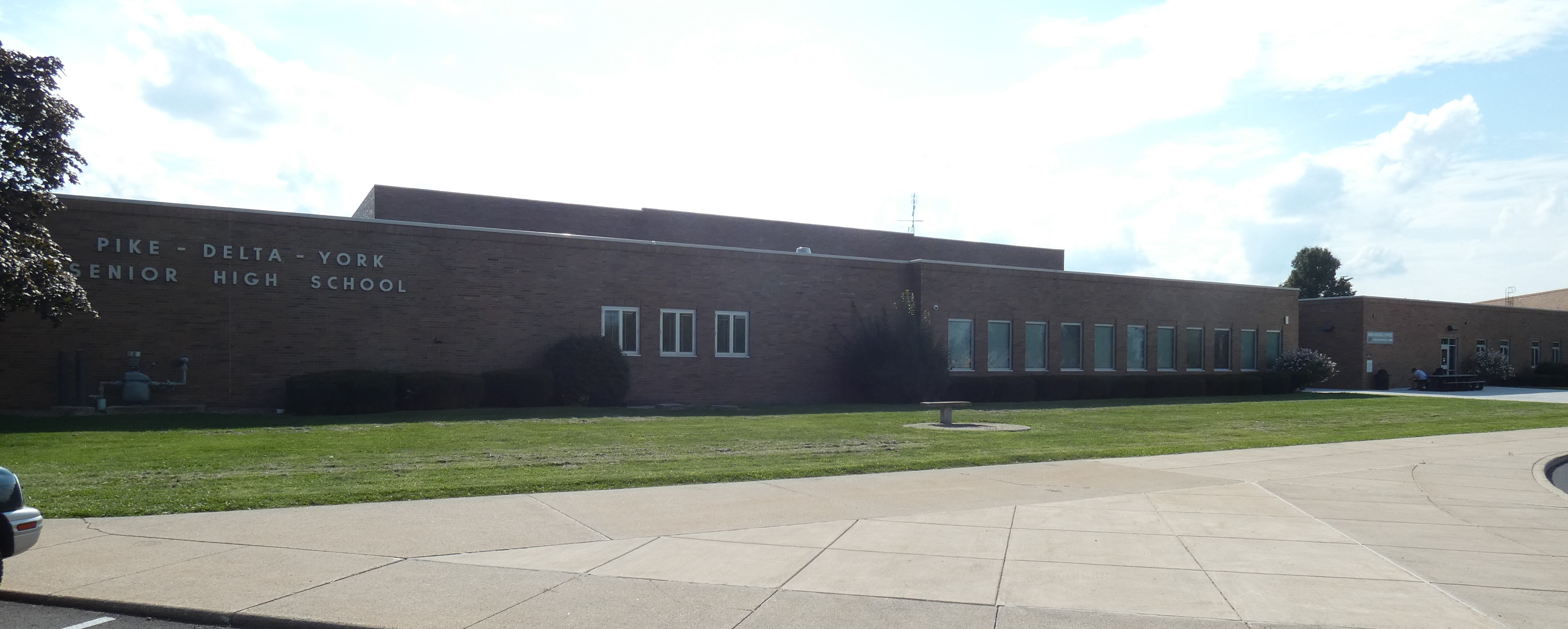
- Photo showing a portion of the school

Location
- 605 Taylor Street; Delta, Ohio 43515; United States; 41°34′57″N 84°0′0″W

Information
- Type: Public, coeducational
- School district: Pike–Delta–York Local School District
- Principal: Dannela Nauta
- Teaching staff: 21.90 (FTE)
- Grades: 9-12
- Enrollment: 361 (2023–2024)
- Student to teacher ratio: 16.48
- Campus type: Rural
- Colors: Green and white
- Athletics conference: Northwest Ohio Athletic League
- Team name: Panthers
- Website: www.pdys.org/page/delta-high-school

Delta High School is a public high school in Delta, Ohio, United States. It is the only high school in the Pike–Delta–York Local School District. School colors are green and white and athletic teams are known as the Panthers who compete as members of the Northwest Ohio Athletic League.

== Athletics ==
=== Ohio High School Athletic Association State Championships ===
- Boys wrestling – 1989, 1996, 1998, 1999, 2014, 2016
- Boys wrestling dual tournament - 2013, 2014, 2015, 2016
- Boys track and field – 1934

==== Other Non-Sanctioned State Championships ====
- Boys Wrestling - 1998, 2024

==== Notable Alumni ====
- Garmin Marathon Winner - 2025 - Konnor Hawkins 2:42:26
