= Collinwood High School (Cleveland) =

Location
- 15210 St. Clair Avenue; Cleveland, Ohio 44110; United States; 41°33′11″N 81°34′28″W

Information
- Type: Public high school
- Opened: 1924
- Closed: 2026
- School district: Cleveland Metropolitan School District
- Dean: Keyanna Aaliyah Harris
- Principal: De’Mari leshauhe York
- Teaching staff: 16.50 (FTE)
- Grades: 9-12
- Student to teacher ratio: 17.09
- Colors: Blue and gray
- Athletics conference: Senate League
- Team name: Railroaders
- Website: www.clevelandmetroschools.org/collinwood

Collinwood High School is a public high school located in the Collinwood neighborhood on the east side of Cleveland, Ohio, United States. It is part of the Cleveland Metropolitan School District. The school is divided into three academies: Advanced Placement Academy, STEM Teaching Professions Academy, and Academy of Interior and Fashion Design.

The school is set to close at the end of the 2025-26 school year, and will consolidate with neighboring Glenville High School

== State championships ==
- Boys track and field – 1962
- Girls track and field – 1997, 1998, 1999, 2000, 2001, 2004, 2005, 2006, 2010

== Notable alumni ==
- Tony Adamle (1924–2000) professional football player with the Cleveland Browns in the All-America Football Conference and the National Football League (NFL)
- Eppie Barney (1944–2004) NFL player (Cleveland Browns)
- James Cotton (1976–), professional football player
- Jerry Dybzinski (1955–present), former professional baseball player in Major League Baseball
- George Fett (1920–1989), cartoonist
- Danny Greene (1933–1977), Irish American mobster
- John Claude Gummoe (1938–) singer-songwriter, lead singer of The Cascades, wrote and recorded "Rhythm of the Rain"
- Jeff Johnson, (1958–) Cleveland City Council member and former Ohio state senator
- Omari Jordan (1978–) professional football player with the Carolina Panthers in the National Football League (NFL)
- Richard Nardi (1915–1965), professional football player in the NFL
- Andre Norton (1912–2005), author
- Sam Palumbo (1932–) professional football player in the American Football League (AFL) and NFL
- Michael D. Polensek (1949–present), Cleveland City Council member
- Cecil Shorts III (1987–), professional football player in the NFL
- Stephanie Tubbs Jones, (1949–2008), U.S. Congresswoman (1999-2008)
- George Voinovich (1936–2016), former Mayor of Cleveland, two-term Ohio Governor, and two-term U.S. Senator.
- Ray Zeh, (1914–2003), college football scoring leader in 1935

== See also ==
- Collinwood school fire
