= Lincoln-West High School =

Location
- 3202 West 30th Street; Cleveland, Ohio 44109; USA
- Coordinates: 41°28′0″N 81°42′9″W

Information
- Type: Public, coeducational high school
- School district: Cleveland Metropolitan School District
- Principal: Christopher Thompson
- Grades: 9–12
- Colors: Red, White, Blue
- Athletics conference: Senate Athletic League
- Team name: Wolverines
- Accreditation: Ohio Department of Education
- Website: clevelandmetroschools.org/lincolnwest

Lincoln-West High School (L-W) is a high school in Cleveland, Ohio's Cleveland Metropolitan School District. The school's name reflects the merger between Cleveland's Lincoln High School and West High School. The current school building was built in 1970.

Lincoln-West has a large multicultural and multilingual population including over 41 nationalities and 25 languages. First generation Americans and immigrants represented at the academy include: Puerto Rican, Russian, Ukrainian, Mexican, Dominican, Chinese, Albanian, Nepali, Arab, Urdu, Vietnamese, Laotian/Thai, African, Polish and Croatian.

Originally, the school district was divided into the East and West Senate Conferences with L-W sports teams playing in the West. In the late 1970s, the CMSD reorganized the conferences into the North and South Senate Conferences with L-W in the North Senate.

The Lincoln-West mascot and nickname is the Wolverines and the school colors are red, white and blue.

== State championships ==
=== Lincoln High School ===
- Baseball: 1946

=== West High School ===
- Wrestling: 1947, 1950, 1951
- Boys cross country: 1950

== Notable alumni ==
- Dartanyon Crockett, bronze-medal winner in men's judo at the London 2012 Paralympics and Rio 2016 United States paralympian, class of 2009
- Dave Ford, professional baseball player in Major League Baseball, class of 1975

=== Lincoln High School ===
- Walt Yowarsky, professional football player, coach, and scout in the National Football League, class of 1946
- Carl Gerstacker, Army Captain and Chairman of the Board, Dow Chemical Company 1960-1976, class of 1934

=== West High School ===
- Linda A. Eastman, chief librarian of the Cleveland Public Library, class of 1885
- Alwin C. Ernst, co-founder of the accounting firm of Ernst & Ernst, class of 1899
- Albert Bushnell Hart, American historian, class of 1870
- Isaac C. Kidd, Rear Admiral in the United States Navy, class of 1902
- James Ford Rhodes, American historian, class of 1865
- James A. Frost, University President
