= James Ford Rhodes High School =

Public high school in Cleveland, Ohio, United States

Location
- 5100 Biddulph Avenue; Cleveland (Old Brooklyn), (Cuyahoga County), Ohio 44144; United States; 41°25′49″N 81°43′17″W

Information
- Type: Public high school
- Principal: Brian Evans
- Average class size: 30
- Colors: Blue and White
- Athletics conference: Senate League
- Mascot: Ram
- Team name: Rams
- Rival: John Marshal and Lincoln-West High School
- Accreditation: North Central Association of Colleges and Schools
- Website: https://www.clevelandmetroschools.org/

James Ford Rhodes High School is located in Cleveland, Ohio, United States, in the west-side neighborhood known as Old Brooklyn. It is part of the Cleveland Metropolitan School District and is commonly referred to as "Rhodes High School."

The school was named for the American industrialist and historian James Ford Rhodes.

== Notable alumni ==
- Janet Bewley, Wisconsin politician
- Drew Carey, actor and current host of The Price Is Right
- Les Horvath, 1944 Heisman Trophy winner
- d.a. levy, poet
- Don McCafferty, NFL player and coach
- William H. Robbins

== Ohio High School Athletic Association State Championships ==
- Track and Field - 1994

== Gallery ==
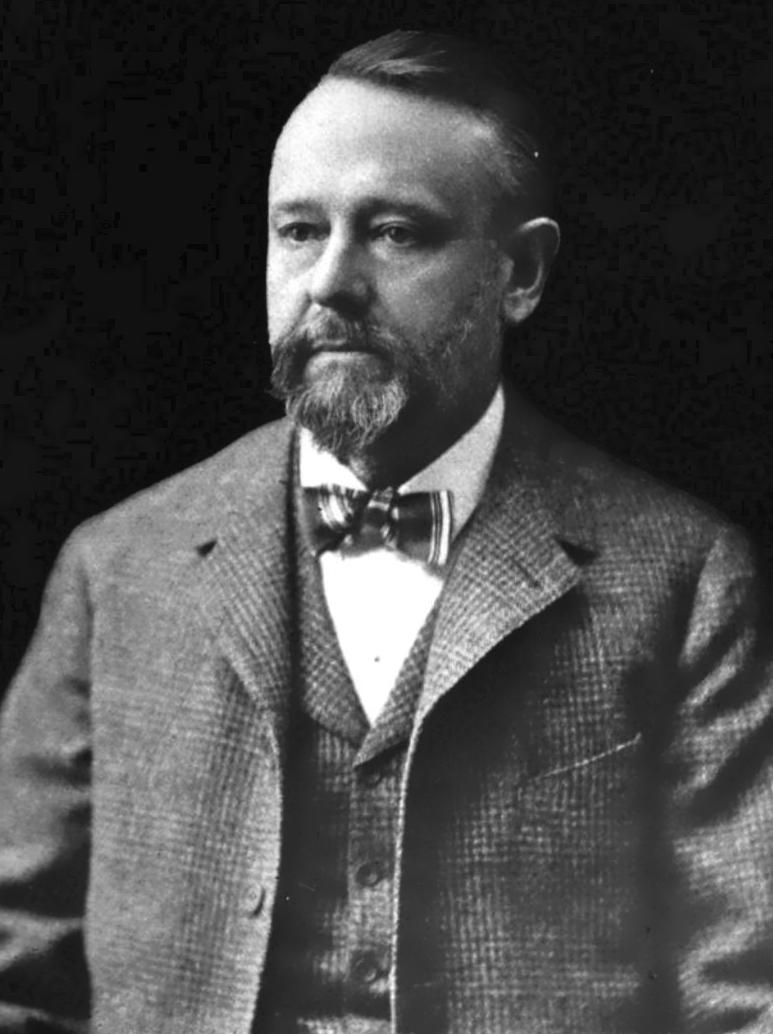
James Ford Rhodes

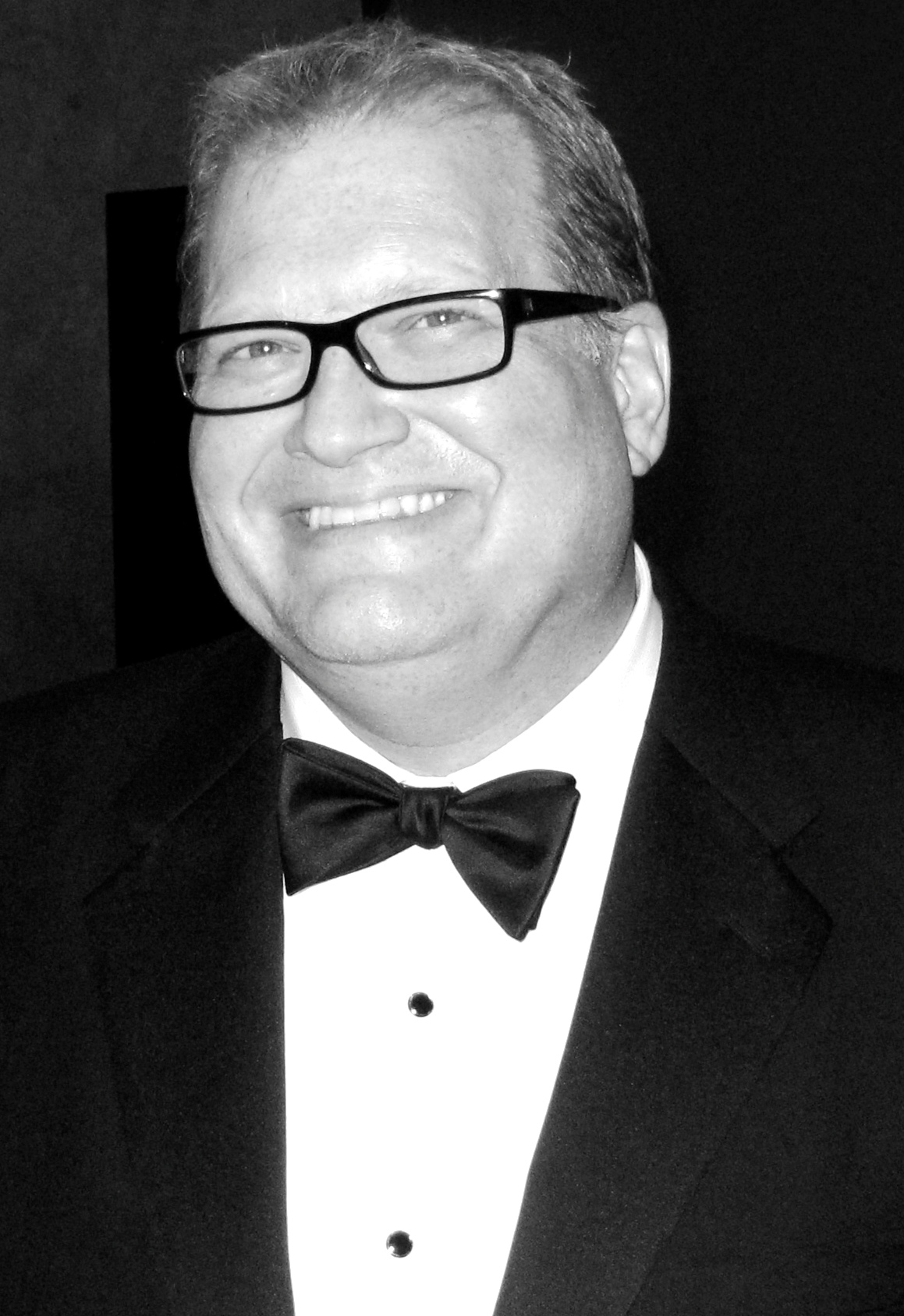
Drew Carey, 1975

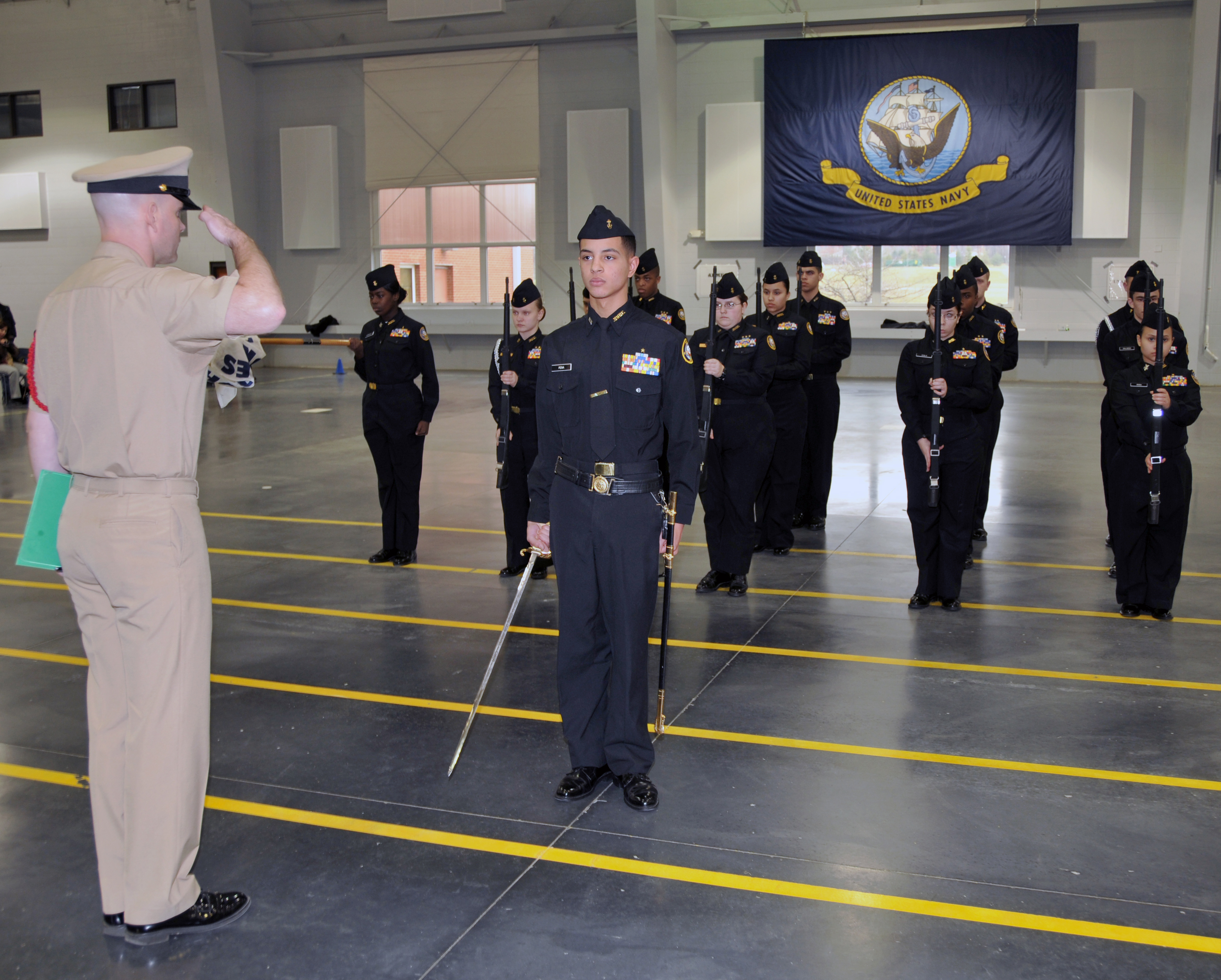
US Navy Junior ROTC of Rhodes High School, 2010

== Links ==
- Cleveland Memory Project
- James Ford Rhodes High School available on Cleveland Public Library Digital Gallery, various years 1949 through 2003
