= John F. Kennedy High School (Cleveland) =

Location
- 15111 Miles Ave. Cleveland, (Cuyahoga County), Ohio 44128; United States; 41°26′36.4″N 81°34′27.2″W

Information
- School type: Public, high school
- Established: 1965/2020
- School district: Cleveland Metropolitan School District
- Superintendent: Eric Gordon
- Principal: Terrance Menefee (Class of 1988)
- Teaching staff: 42.00 (FTE)
- Grades: 9–12
- Gender: co-educational
- Enrollment: 619 (2023-2024)
- Student to teacher ratio: 14.74
- Colors: Red, white, and blue
- Athletics conference: Senate League
- Sports: Football, Basketball, Volleyball, Tennis, Track, Wrestling, Baseball
- Mascot: Fighting Eagles
- Accreditation: North Central Association of Colleges and Schools
- Website: www.clevelandmetroschools.org/JFK

John F. Kennedy is one of the 37 public high schools in the Cleveland Metropolitan School District. The first school building finished construction in 1964 and hosted its first class in 1965. The average enrollment is under 700. The mascot is the Eagle and the school colors are red, white and blue. John F. Kennedy is a comprehensive high schools that offers Advance Placement, Honors, Early College, Career and Technical Classes and JROTC The school offers a variety of activities, including baseball, basketball, football, track and field, and wrestling.

== Community ==
John F. Kennedy High School is located in the Lee-Harvard neighborhood on the southeast of Cleveland. Nearby is a library and shopping center and also by Frederick Douglass recreation center.

== Athletics ==
Volleyball, softball and also girls' basketball, tennis, football and track and field.

=== Ohio High School Athletic Association State Championships ===
- Track - 1969

== Closure of Old Campus ==
The original school building and recreation center, built in 1971, designed by James Whitley, were officially vacated by Cleveland Public Schools in 2020. Since its closure, the school and its recreation center has been subject to vandalism. In 2023, Cleveland Public Schools sought to demolish the school and the recreation center and some ancillary outdoor sports facilities with the intention turn the land over to the City of Cleveland for redevelopment. The school district plans to leave the track and football field intact for use by CPS.

== Notable alumni ==
- Walt Love, former professional NFL wide receiver
- Randell McShepard, executive officer at RPM International Inc.
- Rodney Reynolds, magazine publishing entrepreneur, president of RJR Communications Inc.
- Karen Slade, vice president and general manager of Stevie Wonder’s KJLH radio station
