= John Marshall High School (Ohio) =

Location
- 3952 West 140th Street; Cleveland, Ohio 44111

Information
- Type: Public, Coeducational
- Established: 1932
- School district: Cleveland Metropolitan School District
- Principal: Sara Kidner (Civic & Business Leadership); Timothy Primus (Engineering); Kathryn Haneline (Information Technology)
- Grades: 9–12
- Colors: Red and white
- Athletics conference: Senate Athletic League
- Nickname: Lawyers
- Accreditation: Ohio Department of Education
- Newspaper: Interpreter
- Website: School of Civic and Business Leadership; School of Enginnering; School of Information Technology

John Marshall High School (JMHS) is a public high school with grade levels including 9th through 12th located on the west side of Cleveland. It is part of the Cleveland Metropolitan School District. The building, known as the John Marshall Campus, houses three separate schools: the School of Civic and Business Leadership, the School of Engineering, and the School of Information Technology. While each school has its own administration, the entire campus competes in athletics as the John Marshall Lawyers with school colors of red and white as members of the Senate Athletic League. As of the end of 2025-2026 school year, the school is back to being one school for the foreseeable future.

== History ==
Built in 1932, John Marshall High School has numerous academic programs including college preparatory academies and post-secondary enrollment options. The 1932 building was torn down in 2013, then rebuilt and reopened in 2015 as three small schools underneath one roof known as John Marshall Campus.

== State championships ==
- Boys track and field - 1991,1992
- Boys cross country – 1960,1964
- Boys wrestling - 1961

== Notable alumni ==
- Franklin Cover, actor known primarily from the sitcom The Jeffersons
- Michael Hampton, funk/rock guitarist and Rock and Roll Hall of Fame inductee with Parliament-Funkadelic
- Tom Stincic, professional football player in the National Football League (NFL)
- Ed Sustersic, professional football player in the All-America Football Conference
