= John Adams College and Career Academy =

Public school in Ohio, United States

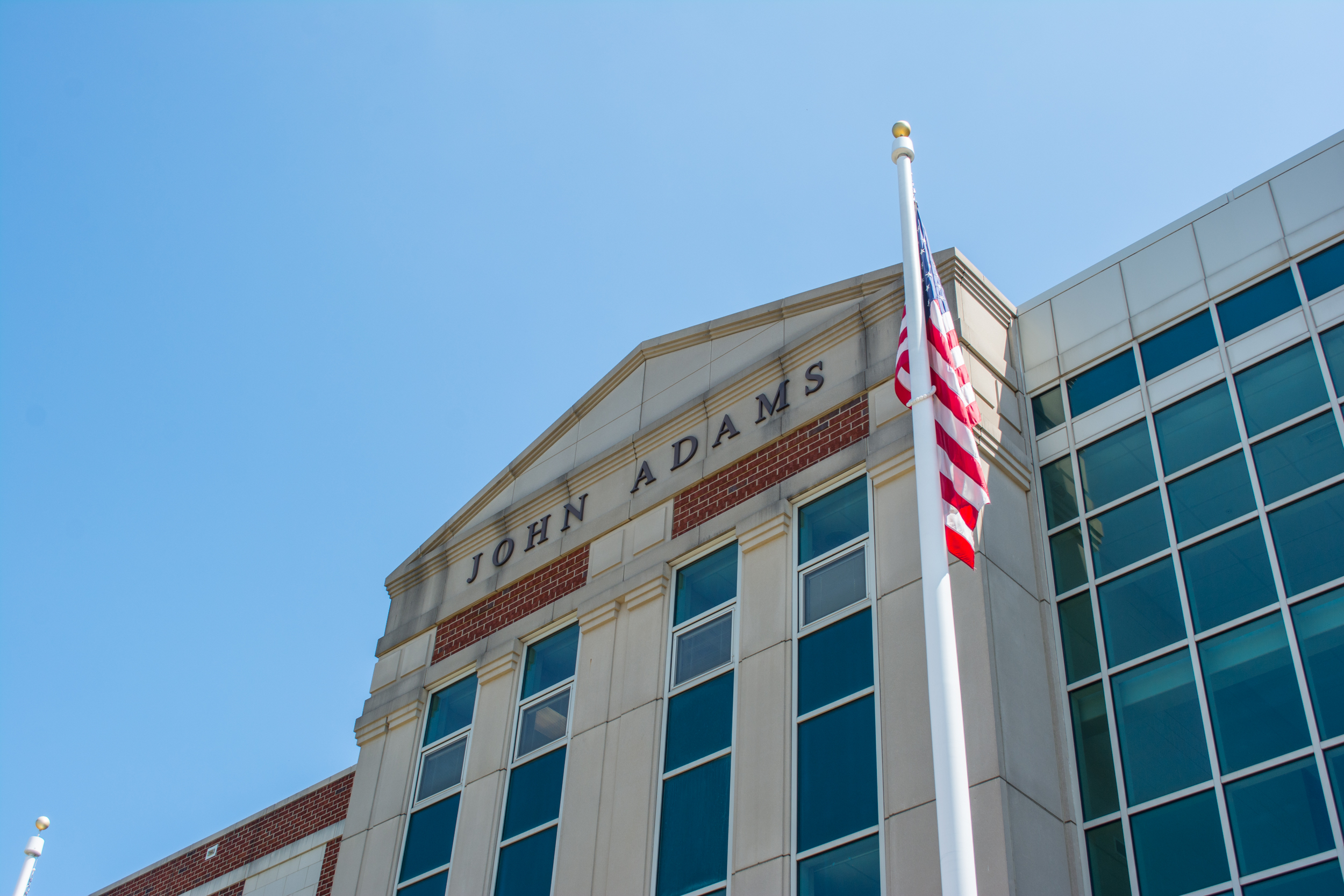

Location
- 3817 Martin Luther King Jr. Drive; Cleveland, (Cuyahoga County), Ohio 44105; United States
- 41°27′17″N 81°36′6″W

Information
- Type: Public, Coeducational high school
- School district: Cleveland Metropolitan School District
- Superintendent: Eric Gordon
- Principal: Donald Jolly
- Teaching staff: 32.00 (FTE)
- Grades: 9-12
- Student to teacher ratio: 14.06
- Colors: Maroon and Gold
- Athletics conference: Senate League
- Team name: Rebels
- Website: www.clevelandmetroschools.org/JACCA

John Adams College and Career Academy is a public high school located on the east side of Cleveland, Ohio, United States. It is part of the Cleveland Metropolitan School District.

== History ==
John Adams High School opened at East 116th Street and Corlett Avenue in 1923. It was closed in 1995, along with West Technical, and Aviation High Schools to help cut the city's budget. The school was rebuilt and reopened in 2006.

== Clubs and activities ==
The school's Latin Club functions as a local chapter of both the Ohio Junior Classical League (OJCL) and National Junior Classical League (NJCL).

== School uniforms ==
The school followed the district dress code requiring polo shirts and dress trousers, skirts, and/or shorts. In 2014 it adopted a new rule requiring polo shirts with monogrammed school logos.

== Sports ==
The mascot for the school is the Rebel. The primary rivals for the school's sports teams are the John F. Kennedy Eagles, who are located nearby, and the James Ford Rhodes Rams on the west side.

=== Ohio High School Athletic Association State Championships ===
- Boys Track and Field — 1953, 1956, 1976, 1982
- Girls Track and Field — 1978, 1979, 1994
- Boys Cross Country — 1954, 1959, 1963

== Notable alumni ==
- Rashaun Allen, NFL player
- William Appling (1932 - 2008), conductor, music educator, pianist and arranger
- Albert Ayler (1936–1970), jazz saxophonist and composer
- Dick Feagler (1938-2018), columnist
- Frederick Fennell (1914–2004), conductor and music educator
- Tom Jackson (1951–), retired NFL linebacker (Denver Broncos), ESPN NFL analyst
- Don King (1931–), boxing promoter
- Rimp Lanier, Former MLB player, (Pittsburgh Pirates)
- Al Lerner (composer) (b. 1919), pianist, composer, and musical director
- Madeline Manning (1948-), track and field Olympic gold medalist
- Nick Mileti (1931-), former owner, Cleveland Cavaliers and Cleveland Indians, chose the Cavs' colors of wine and gold based on John Adams' colors
- Anthony Morgan, Former NFL player for the Chicago Bears (1991–1993) and the Green Bay Packers (1993–1996)
- Frank Pokorny, member of the Ohio House of Representatives (1957–1960; 1963–1968) and Cuyahoga County Commissioner (1968-1976)
- Jack Reynolds (1937-2008) radio and television broadcaster on numerous Cleveland stations, professional wrestling announcer (including for the WWF)
- Phillip Shriver (1922–2011), served as president of Miami University from 1965 to 1981
- Chuck Smith, former MLB player (Florida Marlins)
- Mark E. Talisman (1941–2019), congressional aide and lobbyist
- Robert Ward (1917–2013), composer
