= Cleveland Metropolitan School District =

School district in Ohio, United States

Location
- 1111 Superior Avenue E. Cleveland, Ohio 44114 Cuyahoga; United States

District information
- Type: Public
- Grades: PreK – 12
- Established: 1836
- Superintendent: Dr. Warren Morgan
- Asst. superintendent(s): Trent Mosley, Curtis Timmons, Wayne Belock, Christine Fowler-Mack, Patrick Zohn, Karen Thompson, Lori Ward
- School board: 9 members
- Chair of the board: Sara Elaqad
- Accreditations: AdvancED, Ohio Department of Education
- Budget: $838 million (2017–18 school year)
- Affiliation: Ohio 8

Students and staff
- Students: 38,949
- Teachers: 2659 (2016–17 school year budgeted)
- Staff: 5303 (2016-17 school year budgeted total staff)
- Athletic conference: Senate Athletic League

Other information
- Treasurer: Derek Richey
- Website: clevelandmetroschools.org

Cleveland Metropolitan School District, formerly the Cleveland Municipal School District, is a public school district in the U.S. state of Ohio that serves almost all of the city of Cleveland. The district covers 79 square miles. The Cleveland district is the third largest PreK-12 district in the state, with a 2017–2018 enrollment of about 38,949. CMSD has 68 schools that are for kindergarten to eighth grade students and 39 schools for high school aged students.

In 2005 and in years following, the system faced large budget shortfalls and repeated possibility of slipping back into "academic emergency" as rated by the Ohio Department of Education. The mayor was given control of the city schools after a series of elected school boards were deemed ineffective by city voters. The school board appoints a chief executive officer, the equivalent of a district superintendent, who is responsible for district management. CMSD is the only district in Ohio that is under direct control of the mayor, who appoints a school board. The former chairman of the Board of Education, Robert M. Heard Sr., was appointed July 1, 2007 by Mayor Frank G. Jackson, and CEO's appointed included Barbara Byrd Bennett and Eugene Sanders. In response to declining enrollment over more than a decade and the corresponding growth in charter schools in the city, the District took several steps to improve academic performance and increase graduation rates. In the 2007–08 school year, the District changed its name to the Cleveland Metropolitan School District to attract students throughout the region.

The district has seen the graduation rate improve 22.4 percent since 2010. The 4-year graduation rate for students who entered the 9th grade in 2014 and graduated by 2017 was 74.6 percent. The 5-year graduation rate for students who entered the 9th grade in 2013 and graduated by 2017 was 79.6 percent. CMSD reports that the 4-year graduation rate for the class of 2018 was 74.6 percent.

In 2011, Board of Education Chair Denise Link, led the board in its current transformation efforts, including the appointment of Eric S. Gordon as chief executive officer. In 2012, collaboration with the community and Cleveland Teachers Union, the district designed "Cleveland's Plan for Transforming Schools" also referred to as "The Cleveland Plan." The purpose of the Cleveland Plan was to remove legislative barriers to school reform in Cleveland and to implement a portfolio strategy to: Grow the number of high-performing CMSD and charter schools in Cleveland and close and replace failing schools; Focus CMSD's central office on key support and governance roles and transfer authority and resources to schools; Invest and phase in high-leverage system reforms across all schools from preschool to college and career; and Create the Cleveland Transformation Alliance to ensure accountability for all public schools in the city. This included major changes in the District's contract with the Cleveland Teachers Union. House Bill 525 was then created and passed with a bipartisan vote of 27-4, to support the districts most aggressive reform strategies in history. Working closely with Mayor Frank G. Jackson and a coalition of concerned citizens throughout the city, Link and Gordon additionally led the district to passage of CMSD's first operating levy, Issue 107, in 16 years in November, 2012. The District moved its central office in 2013 to its current location at 1111 Superior Ave. E, Cleveland, Ohio 44114.

In 2013, Board Chair Denise L. Link won the Green-Garner "Top Urban Educator" Award, the highest honor given by the Council of the Great City Schools for significant contributions to urban schools and students. CEO Eric Gordon was a national finalist for the same award in 2012. In 2016, Eric Gordon won the "Urban Educator of the Year Award from the Council of Great City Schools.

== History ==
Central High School opened in 1846. West High School serving Ohio City followed.

After World War II, middle-class jobs and families migrated to the suburbs leaving behind predominantly low-income student enrollment in the Cleveland Public School system. A long-term decline in population began in 1950. It was exacerbated in the 1960s and early 1970s by white flight and suburbanization. While the city's total population declined, Cleveland Public Schools' enrollment increased from 99,686 in 1950 to 134,765 in 1960 and 148,793 in 1963. Cleveland Public Schools financially struggled with a declining tax base due to regional industrial decline and depopulation of the metropolitan and urban areas in favor of the suburbs.

On December 12, 1973, the National Association for the Advancement of Colored People's Cleveland Chapter filed suit, Reed v. Rhodes, against the Cleveland Board of Education in Cleveland's United States District Court for the Northern District of Ohio to racially integrate Cleveland Public Schools, claiming that the public schools were at least partly at fault for Cleveland's housing segregation into ethnic neighborhoods. Between August 31, 1976 and 1984, Chief United States District Judge Frank J. Battisti issued over 4,000 court orders including implementation of forced-busing of Cleveland Public Schools; the case was appealed to the 6th Circuit Court of Appeals, which by 23 Aug. 1979 upheld Battisti's earlier orders, and was later upheld on appeal by the Supreme Court of the United States.

Many factors resulted in declining enrollments. Mandatory busing was one of several factors which sped up the migration out of Cleveland. The administrative and operational expense of complying with mandatory busing and other federal court orders caused a dramatic increase in overhead expenditures per student, while declining tax revenues resulted in lower expenditures on actually educating public school students.

Before mandatory busing in 1976, minority enrollment in Cleveland Public Schools was 58%; by 1994 it was 71%. By 1996, Cleveland Public Schools' total enrollment was half of what it was pre-mandatory busing. In 1991, Ohio had a new proficiency test for 9th grade students, which the majority of Cleveland Public Schools students did not pass. By 1994, almost 50% of the system's students were failing to graduate from high school. Meanwhile, many graduates did not qualify for entry-level jobs, with many employers increasingly requiring secondary or post-secondary degrees due to more information technology-related jobs and other changes in the overall economy.

In March 1994, the National Association for the Advancement of Colored People's Cleveland Chapter, Reed v. Rhodes plaintiff, challenged the fairness of the Ohio 9th grade proficiency test as an Ohio secondary school graduation requirement for African-American students; the subsequent federal court settlement agreement(s) left the 9th grade secondary school graduation requirement intact and unchanged in 1994 and subsequently. Prior to mandatory busing, Cleveland Public Schools' graduation rate was 75 percent; by 1996 it had dropped to 26.6 percent. Although mandatory busing ended in the 1990s, Cleveland continued to slide into poverty, reaching a nadir in 2004 when it was named the poorest major city in the United States. Cleveland was again rated the poorest major city in the U.S. in 2006, with a poverty rate of 32.4%.

== Schools ==
=== Elementary & K-8 schools ===
School name	Lowest Grade	Highest Grade	Category
Douglas MacArthur Girls Leadership Academy	Pre-Kindergarten	3	Growth
Valley View Boys Leadership Academy	Pre-Kindergarten	3	Growth
Warner-Girls Leadership Academy	Pre-Kindergarten	3	Growth
Dike School of the Arts	Pre-Kindergarten	8	Growth
Adlai Stevenson	Pre-Kindergarten	8	Monitor Closely
Andrew J. Rickoff	Pre-Kindergarten	8	Refocus
Anton Grdina	Pre-Kindergarten	8	Monitor Closely
Bolton	Pre-Kindergarten	8	Monitor Closely
Case	Pre-Kindergarten	8	Refocus
Carl & Louis Stokes, Central Academy	Pre-Kindergarten	8	Refocus
Charles W. Eliot	Pre-Kindergarten	8	Refocus
Clara E. Westropp	Pre-Kindergarten	8	Growth
Daniel E. Morgan	Pre-Kindergarten	8	Monitor Closely
Franklin D. Roosevelt Academy	Pre-Kindergarten	8	Repurpose
H. Barbara Booker	Pre-Kindergarten	8	Repurpose
Hannah Gibbons-Nottingham	Pre-Kindergarten	8	Repurpose
Harvey Rice	Pre-Kindergarten	8	Repurpose
Iowa-Maple	Pre-Kindergarten	8	Refocus
Joseph M. Gallagher	Pre-Kindergarten	8	Refocus
Marion-Sterling	Pre-Kindergarten	8	Monitor Closely
Mary M. Bethune	Pre-Kindergarten	8	Monitor Closely
Memorial	Pre-Kindergarten	8	Monitor Closely
Miles	Pre-Kindergarten	8	Monitor Closely
Miles Park	Pre-Kindergarten	8	Monitor Closely
Newton D. Baker	Pre-Kindergarten	8	Refocus
Oliver H. Perry	Pre-Kindergarten	8	Growth
Orchard	Pre-Kindergarten	8	Growth
Patrick Henry	Pre-Kindergarten	8	Refocus
Paul L. Dunbar	Pre-Kindergarten	8	Monitor Closely
Paul Revere	Pre-Kindergarten	8	Monitor Closely
Robert H. Jamison	Pre-Kindergarten	8	Repurpose
Tremont Montessori	Pre-Kindergarten	8	Growth
Wade Park	Pre-Kindergarten	8	Refocus
Waverly	Pre-Kindergarten	8	Monitor Closely
Wilbur Wright	Pre-Kindergarten	8	Refocus
Almira	Kindergarten	8	Monitor Closely
Benjamin Franklin	Kindergarten	8	Growth
Buckeye-Woodland	Kindergarten	8	Repurpose
Buhrer	Kindergarten	8	Refocus
Charles Dickens	Kindergarten	8	Repurpose
Charles A. Mooney	Kindergarten	8	Monitor Closely
Clark	Kindergarten	8	Growth
Denison	Kindergarten	8	Monitor Closely
East Clark	Kindergarten	8	Monitor Closely
Fullerton	Kindergarten	8	Refocus
George W. Carver	Kindergarten	8	Repurpose
Joseph F. Landis	Kindergarten	8	Close
Louis Agassiz	Kindergarten	8	Growth
Louisa May Alcott	Kindergarten	8	Growth
Luis Muñoz Marín	Kindergarten	8	Refocus
Marion C. Seltzer	Kindergarten	8	Growth
Mary B. Martin	Kindergarten	8	Repurpose
McKinley	Kindergarten	8	Refocus
Michael R. White	Kindergarten	8	Repurpose
Mound	Kindergarten	8	Repurpose
Nathan Hale	Kindergarten	8	Refocus
Robinson G. Jones	Kindergarten	8	Growth
Riverside	Kindergarten	8	Growth
Scranton	Kindergarten	8	Monitor Closely
Sunbeam	Kindergarten	8	Refocus
Walton	Kindergarten	8	Monitor Closely
Watterson-Lake	Kindergarten	8	Growth
William C. Bryant	Kindergarten	8	Growth
Willow	Kindergarten	8	Monitor Closely
Artemus Ward	Kindergarten	8	Monitor Closely

=== High schools ===
School Name	Lowest Grade	Highest Grade	Principal
Thomas Jefferson Campus -International Newcomers Academy -Ninth Grade Academy	Pre-Kindergarten	9	Principal varies in each academy Rhonda A. Saegert Danielle T. Simmons
Whitney M. Young Gifted & Talented Leadership Academy	2	12	Karen M. Byron-Johnson
Bard High School Early College Cleveland	9	12	
Cleveland School of the Arts	7	12	Andrew J. Koonce
Carl F. Shuler Ninth Grade Academy	9	9	Lisa Williams-Locklear
Collinwood High School Campus -College Board Academy -Interior Design & Fashion Merchandising -Teaching Professions Academy	9	12	Principal varies in each academy Kevin L. Payton Crystal Maclin Marnisha Brown
East Technical High School Campus -Ninth Grade Academy -Community Wrap Around Academy -Engineering & Science Tech Academy -New Tech	9	12	Principal varies in each academy
Garrett Morgan School of Science -New Tech	9	12	LaVerne Hooks Erin Frew
Ginn Academy	9	12	Clifford Hayes Jr.
Glenville High School Campus -Health Exercise Sports & Recreation Academy -Programming & Software Development Academy -Ninth Grade Academy	9	12	Principal varies in each academy Doris Redic Teresa Conley David Reimen
James Ford Rhodes High School	9	12	Diane Rollins
Jane Addams Business Careers Center -Design Lab Early College	9	12	Annie McGhee Raymon L. Spottsville
John Adams High School Campus -College Board Academy -Financial Services Academy -Ninth Grade Academy	9	12	Principal varies in each academy Donald J. Jolly Brenda E. Washington Damon L. Holmes
John F. Kennedy Academic Campus -Entertainment Marketing Academy -Interactive Media Academy -Ninth Grade Academy	9	12	Principal varies in each academy Samuel J. Maul Maryum Spencer-Sims Jason L. Tidmore
John Hay High School Campus -Cleveland School of Science and Medicine -Cleveland School of Architecture and Design -Cleveland Early College School	9	12	Principal varies in each academy Edward Weber Tianna Maxey Carol Lockhart
John Marshall High School	9	12	Luther E. Johnson Jr.
Lincoln-West High School Campus -Community Wrap Around Academy -International Studies Academy -Programming & Software Development Academy	9	12	Principal varies in each academy Maria Carlson Dr. Irene G. Javier Perry W. Myles Sr.
Martin Luther King, Jr. Career Campus -Health Careers Center -Law & Municipal Careers	9	12	Marilyn Cargile Cynthia Hanish William Davis
Max S. Hayes High School	9	12	Alex R. Murphy
MC2STEM High School	9	12	Jeffrey D. McClellan
SuccessTech Academy	9	12	Sara Kidner
Washington Park Environmental Studies Academy	9	12	Alisa Lawson-McKinnie
High Tech Academy	10	12	Stacy M. Hutchinson
High Achievement Academy -Whitney Young students only	11	12	N/A

"Growth schools," the highest-rated group, will stay as is while gaining some extra freedom in management. "Refocus schools," are improving and will get added attention—for example, leadership training—to help continue their progress. "Repurpose schools," which face staff changes or conversion to charters to give them a jolt. The remaining schools will close, with students transferred to neighboring facilities unless they take advantage of citywide open enrollment. "Monitor closely schools," are those schools that will not be placed in a group until the 2011–2012 school year.

Prior to 1998 the school board was elected. Since that time the board has been appointed by the Mayor.

== Gifted, honors and advanced placement schools ==
In October 1921, the Cleveland Public School System began its first program for gifted children at Denison Elementary School. Children in grades four, five, and six participated. This program was supported by the Women's City Club of Cleveland. From 1921 to 1927, fourteen elementary and two junior high schools were established as centers for gifted children. In the decades of the 1940s and 1950s, the Cleveland Public Schools developed and articulated a program for gifted pupils from the primary grades through high school. Thus, from a modest beginning, the program, which at one time was called the "greatest experiment in education," has grown and developed into a program that currently provides enriching educational experiences for over 2,500 children with high intellectual and/or academic ability.

== Funding ==
Total district revenues for the 2011–2012 school year amounted to $630,981,000, with 27% of revenues coming from local funding, 58% from state funding, and 15% derived from federal funding. This total revenue amounted to $15,464 per pupil. The Ohio Department of Education reports the average teacher salary for the 2012–2013 school year was $69,314, with a median teacher salary of $72,940.

== Gifted education ==
The Gifted Education Program in the Cleveland Metropolitan School District consists of the 'Major Work' Program, currently in grades 2–8, and the Honors and Advanced Placement (AP) Programs in grades 9–12. There are seven PreK-8 Schools, one Grades 2–12 School, and five Grades 9–12 Schools that service gifted identified children. The AP courses vary amongst high schools.

Entrance into the 'Major Work' Program is based upon a 95 percentile score in the National Range in a major subject area on the Stanford 10 Group Test or the Woodcock-Johnson-III Individual Test. A Full Scale IQ score of 125 or above on the Otis-Lennon Group Test or the WISC-IV Individual Test also qualifies a child for the program.

== Grades 2–6 Gifted Courses, Grades 7–8 Honors Courses ==
- Benjamin Franklin—2–8
- Garfield—2–8
- O. H. Perry—2–8
- Riverside—2–8
- Wade Park—2–8
- Whitney Young—2–8

== Grades 9–12 courses ==
Gifted coded students feed into these high schools unless they apply to another special program or thematic school:

- Collinwood
- East Tech
- Glenville
- James F. Rhodes
- John Marshall
- Whitney Young

=== Advanced Placement program ===
Courses vary from school to school:

- Carl Shuler
- Cleveland School of Arts
- Cleveland School of Architecture and Design, John Hay Campus
- Cleveland School of Science and Medicine, John Hay Campus
- Collinwood
- Early College, John Hay Campus
- East Tech
- Garrett Morgan School of Science
- Ginn Academy
- Glenville
- James F. Rhodes
- John Marshall
- Lincoln West
- South
- Whitney Young
  - Note Whitney Young has grades 2–12

== Graduation requirements ==
In early 2009, Ohio Department of Education announced its new high school graduation requirements that would take effect starting with students entering ninth grade in 2010 (Class of 2014). Under these requirements, students must take an additional year of mathematics, more business/ career tech class and fewer electives.

== See also ==
- List of school districts in Ohio
