= Arthur Foley =

American physicist, university professor, and architect

Arthur Lee Foley (1867–1945) was an American physicist, university professor, and architect.

== Early life and education ==
Foley received his A.B. from Indiana University (Bloomington) in 1890. He received his Ph.D. in physics from Cornell University (Ithaca, New York) in 1897, with research under the direction of Edward Leamington Nichols.

== Career and research ==
Throughout his career, Foley was interested in radiation and wave phenomena of all sorts. He completed his doctorate just about a year before Marie Skłodowska-Curie, Pierre Curie, and Gustave Bémont announced (November 1898 in Paris) their discovery of radium. Seizing an opportunity to popularize a new scientific phenomenon, Foley was giving public demonstrations of radiation from radium as early as 1904. He demonstrated some effects of the radiation by using the spinthariscope, invented by Sir William Crookes in 1903. Foley collaborated with IU Instructor Ryland Ratliff, investigating properties of “one-tenth of a gram of ‘Curie’ radium chloride.”

Foley also investigated radio waves and sound waves. In 1917, he became the first recipient of a professorship in the Luther Dana Waterman Institute for Research at Indiana University, where he studied acoustic phenomena. Foley worked on theories of sound amplification, leading to patents for the ideal shapes of horns for musical instruments, and for the optimum placement of locomotive whistles He photographed sound waves.

Foley worked on theories of sound amplification, leading to patents for the ideal shapes of horns for musical instruments. and for the optimum placement of locomotive whistles. He measured the speed of sound in open air and within musical instruments.

P. Blakiston's Son & Company, Inc. of Philadelphia published his college textbook, College Physics, in 1933. The third edition appeared in 1941.

Gamma of Indiana Chapter of Phi Beta Kappa at Indiana University was chartered in 1911. In addition to members of the Senior Class, several outstanding Indiana University alumni were also elected. Arthur Lee Foley, Rolla Roy Ramsey, Albert Fredrick Ottomar Germann, and Ross Franklin Lockridge Sr. were among the alumni elected in 1911.

Foley played significant roles in building the Indiana University new campus in Dunn's Woods. He was a member of the 1909 committee that recommended building a reservoir to deal with the university's chronic water shortage, and was architect and engineer for constructing the reservoir dam in 1910. He was architect and superintendent of construction for two power plants and connecting tunnels to supply steam, electricity, and telephone service to the new buildings. He was architect and superintendent of construction for the Wellhouse (1906) and for a 1907 addition to Maxwell Hall. He was superintendent of construction for Student Building (1906), the Library (1907), and Biology Hall (1910). He directed improvements in the acoustics of Assembly Hall in 1916–1917.

Foley was a Fellow of the Indiana Academy of Science, and served as President of the academy in 1909. He published several scholarly papers in Proceedings of the Indiana Academy of Science.

The Foley House Basement Key Award is given to an Indiana University School of Optometry alum for excellence in the field of optometry. Arthur Foley's former house served, beginning in 1959, as the IU optometry clinic. The basement served as a gathering place for optometry students, each given a key to Foley House. When Foley house was being demolished, the basement door was salvaged. That door, preserved and revered, now bears the name of each recipient of the Foley House Basement Key Award.
