= Cataract Lake =

Cataract Lake may refer to:

- Cagles Mill Lake, Indiana, United States
- Cataract Lake (Arizona), United States
- Lake Cataract, near Cataract Dam, New South Wales, Australia
