= Rolla Ramsey =

American physicist

Rolla Roy Ramsey (April 11, 1872 – June 11, 1955) was an American physicist, university professor, and radio electronics pioneer.

== Early life and education ==
Ramsey was born in the unincorporated community of Morning Sun, Preble County, Ohio, son of Sarah Rachel McQuiston (1843–1926) and Joseph Steele Ramsey (1838–1913). He grew up on a farm. As a university teacher, Rolla took a special interest in "farm boys" who took physics courses; he observed that "they were not afraid to work". Rolla had a sister, Leila Jane Ramsey Lemon (1868–1964), and a brother, Arthur McQuiston Ramsey (1875–1963).

Rolla Ramsey attended Oxford High School (now Talawanda High School) in the village of Oxford, Ohio, graduating in 1891. In high school, he enrolled in the physics course and found both the subject and his instructor to be inspiring. He spent many hours thoroughly studying his own copy of the textbook Fourteen Weeks in Physics. His career in science was launched.

He attended Miami University in Oxford for two years, and then transferred to Indiana University in Bloomington. He received the A.B. degree in physics from Indiana University in 1895. In his senior year, Ramsey was an assistant in the physics department shop. He also was a member of the Miami and IU football teams. He then took a position as science teacher at Decatur (Indiana) High School during the 1895–1896 year. Ramsey returned to Bloomington to become a laboratory assistant in the department of physics and a graduate student in physics during the 1896–1897 year. He received the A.M. degree in physics from Indiana University in 1898.

While writing his master's thesis during the 1897–1898 academic year, Ramsey held the position of professor of physics at Westminster College, New Wilmington, Pennsylvania, one of the first coeducational colleges in the United States. He then spent a year (1898–1899) as a scholar in physics during the formation of Clark University, Worcester, Massachusetts. The formal opening of Clark (as the first all-graduate-studies institution in the United States) was on October 2, 1899, with research-focused departments of Mathematics, Physics, Chemistry, Biology, and Psychology.

== Career and research ==
Ramsey moved to Cornell University in Ithaca, New York, and pursued doctoral studies there. He earned the Ph.D. in Physics from Cornell in 1901. His research was under the direction of Edward Leamington Nichols (1854–1937), co-editor of the scholarly journal Physical Review. The University of Missouri in Columbia hired Dr. Ramsey as Instructor of Physics in 1901.

Indiana University's physics department recruited Ramsey as assistant professor in 1903. He was promoted to associate professor in 1905 and to professor in 1919. Ramsey served two short terms as head of the department. He retired as professor emeritus of physics in 1942.

Gamma of Indiana chapter of Phi Beta Kappa was chartered in 1911. Among the members of the Senior Class elected as charter members was Ramsey's student Frank Erhart Emmanuel Germann. Outstanding Indiana University alumni were also elected. Rolla Roy Ramsey, Arthur Lee Foley, Albert Fredrick Ottomar Germann, and Ross Franklin Lockridge, Sr. were among the alumni elected in 1911.

Ramsey was absorbed in all aspects of radio throughout his career. He initiated the first voice radio broadcasts from Bloomington. In 1921, he tested an early form of wireless service for campus newspapers in the Midwest. That year, in an Indiana University lecture on wireless transmission, he treated his audience to an opera transmitted from Pittsburgh by pioneer broadcasting station Westinghouse KDKA. Ramsey conducted a demonstration of “wireless telephony” for a group of 75 students and faculty in 1922; his experiments sparked the first calls for a radio station on the IU campus. In a 1927 demonstration, he sent a television image from a transmitter to a receiver at opposite ends of an Indiana University lecture hall.

Ramsey was head of the World War I laboratory-oriented radio electronics course at Indiana University. He introduced civilian instruction of radio into the United States Army. The Army called again for his services in World War II when the government decided to train men in the fundamentals and use of radio. The original plan was for the training to take place at College Park, Maryland. After visiting College Park and finding the facilities there inadequate, Ramsey immediately recommended that the responsibility for training be given to universities. This recommendation was accepted. About three hundred students were trained at Indiana University in this program.

Ramsey’s first book, Experimental Radio, was published in 1922. He then formed the Ramsey Publishing Company in Bloomington to print and distribute his books. He was the author of eighty scholarly articles on radio and electronics.

Ramsey was a pioneer in perfecting the ball-and-stick models used by subsequent physics and chemistry students for many decades to represent the composition and the three-dimensional geometry of molecules. His molecular-model kits were manufactured and marketed by W. M. Welch throughout the middle of the twentieth century.

Ramsey was a Fellow of the American Association for the Advancement of Science, inducted in 1900. Fifty years later, he was made an honorary member of the A.A.A S. He was a Fellow of the Indiana Academy of Science and President of the Academy in 1930; he published more than forty scholarly articles in Proceedings of the Indiana Academy of Science. He was a Fellow of the American Physical Society. He was also a member of the Institute of Radio Engineers, Sigma Xi, the Scientech Club of Indianapolis, and the Bloomington Kiwanis club.

== Personal life ==
Ramsey married Clara Ethel Smith (1872–1964) on December 27, 1897. They had a son, Hugh Smith Ramsey (November 20, 1907 – June 30, 1989). Hugh attended Indiana University (A.B. with Distinction in Botany, 1929; M.D. 1934). He served as a reserve medical officer in the United States Army during World War II. He was coroner and a city councilman in Bloomington.

Rolla Ramsey was an Elder in the Bloomington United Presbyterian Church.
