= Indiana Academy of Science =

Organization for the advancement of science

Coordinates: 39°46′7.6″N 86°10′9.7″W

- Formation: 1885
- Type: Non-profit
- Headquarters: Indiana
- Location: United States
- Website: indianaacademyofscience.org

The Indiana Academy of Science is a non-profit organization that promotes the advancement of science. It is based in Indiana and was founded in 1885.

The first meeting was held on December 29, 1885, in the Marion County Courthouse in Indianapolis. The Academy was officially incorporated on December 21, 1887.

The Proceedings of the Indiana Academy of Science began with volume 1 in 1891, published in 1892 and containing the papers from 1885 through 1891; it has been published annually since then.

== Presidents of the Academy ==
The Academy has had the following presidents:

1885	David Starr Jordan, Indiana University
1886	David Starr Jordan, Indiana University
1887	John M. Coulter, Wabash College
1888	John P.D. John (1843–1916), DePauw University
1889	John C. Branner, Indiana University
1890	Thomas C. Mendenhall, Rose Polytechnic Institute
1891	Oliver P. Hay, Butler University
1892	John L. Campbell (1827–1904), Wabash College
1893	Joseph C. Arthur, Purdue University
1894	William A. Noyes, Rose Polytechnic Institute
1895	Amos W. Butler (1860–1937), Brookville
1896	Stanley Coulter, Purdue University
1897	Thomas Gray, Rose Polytechnic Institute
1898	Clarence A. Waldo, Purdue University
1899	Carl H. Eigenmann, Indiana University
1900	David W. Dennis, Earlham College
1901	Mason B. Thomas, Wabash College
1902	Harvey W. Wiley, Purdue University
1903	Willis S. Blatchley, Indiana University
1904	Carl L. Mees (1853–1932), Rose Polytechnic Institute
1905	John S. Wright (1870–1951), Eli Lilly and Company
1906	Robert Hessler, Cincinnati
1907	David M. Mottier, Indiana University
1908	Glenn Culbertson, Hanover College
1909	Arthur L. Foley, Indiana University
1910	Percy N. Evans, Purdue University
1911	Charles R. Dryer, Indiana State Normal School
1912	Joseph P. Naylor, DePauw University
1913	Donaldson Bodine, Wabash College
1914	Severance Burrage, Eli Lilly and Company
1915	Wilbur A. Cogshall, Indiana University
1916	Andrew J. Bigney, Moores Hill College
1917	William Moenkhaus, Indiana University
1918	Edward B. Williamson, Bluffton
1919	Edward B. Williamson, Bluffton
1920	Henry L. Bruner, Butler University
1921	Howard E. Enders, Purdue University
1922	Frank M. Andrews, Indiana University
1923	Charles A. Behrens, Purdue University
1924	Charles C. Deam, Indiana Dept. of Conservation
1925	Edgar R. Cummings, Indiana University
1926	William M. Blanchard, DePauw University
1927	Frank B. Wade, Shortridge High School
1928	Edward G. Mahin, University of Notre Dame
1929	Louis J. Rettger, Indiana State Normal School
1930	Rolla R. Ramsey, Indiana University
1931	John J. Davis, Purdue University
1932	Fernandus Payne, Indiana University
1933	Marcus A. Lyon, South Bend Clinic
1934	Julius Nieuwland, University of Notre Dame
1935	Will Scott, Indiana University
1936	Ray C. Friesner, Butler University
1937	William E. Edington, DePauw University
1938	Eli Lilly Jr., Eli Lilly and Company
1939	Truman G. Yuncker, DePauw University
1940	Frank N. Wallace, Indiana Dept. of Conservation
1941	Paul Weatherwax, Indiana University
1942	Melvin G. Mellon, Purdue University
1943	Theodor Just, University of Notre Dame
1944	Clyde A. Malott, Indiana University
1945	Millard S. Markle, Earlham College
1946	Edward P. Degering, Purdue University
1947	James F. Mackell, Indiana State Teachers College
1948	Winona Hazel Welch, DePauw University
1949	Charles L. Porter, Purdue University
1950	Stephen S. Visher, Indiana University
1951	William P. Morgan, Indiana Central College
1952	Prentice D. Edwards, Ball State Teachers College
1953	Horace M. Powell, Eli Lilly and Company
1954	Otto B. Christy, Ball State Teachers College
1955	Alfred H. Meyer, Valparaiso University
1956	Raymond E. Girton, Purdue University
1957	Willis H. Johnson, Wabash College
1958	William A. Daily, Eli Lilly and Company
1959	Ralph E. Cleland, Indiana University
1960	Arthur T. Guard, Purdue University
1961	Lawrence H. Baldinger, University of Notre Dame
1962	Harry G. Day, Indiana University
1963	Howard H. Michaud, Purdue University
1964	Edward L. Haenisch, Wabash College
1965	Frank J. Welcher, Indiana University
1966	Carrolle A. Markle, Earlham College
1967	Alton A. Lindsey, Purdue University
1968	William J. Wayne, Indiana University
1969	Howard R. Youse, DePauw University
1970	Frank A. Guthrie, Rose Polytechnic Institute
1971	Samuel N. Postlethwait, Purdue University
1972	Otto K. Behrens, Eli Lilly and Company
1973	William B. Hopp, Indiana State University
1974	Damian V. Schmelz, Saint Meinrad College
1975	John B. Patton, Indiana Geological Survey
1976	Donald J. Cook, DePauw University
1977	Clarence F. Dineen, St. Mary's College
1978	Jerry J. Nisbet, Ball State University
1979	J. Dan Webster, Hanover College
1980	Robert E. Henderson, Indianapolis Center for Advance Research
1981	Robert E. Henderson, Indianapolis Center for Advance Research
1982	William R. Eberly, Manchester College
1983	Alice S. Bennett, Ball State University
1984	Theodore J. Crovello, University of Notre Dame
1985	Benjamin Moulton, Indiana State University
1986	Ernest E. Campaigne, Indiana University
1987	Stanley J. Burden, Taylor University
1988	Wilton N. Melhorn, Purdue University
1989	Charlotte M. Boener, Indiana State University
1990	Wendell F. McBurney, Indiana University-Purdue University at Indianapolis
1991	Cornelius W. Pettinga, Eli Lilly and Company
1992	C.W. Lovell, Purdue University
1993	Duvall A. Jones, Saint Joseph's College
1994	Wayne P. Mueller, University of Evansville
1995	Gene Kritsky, College of Mt. St. Joseph
1996	James R. Gammon, DePauw University
1997	James D. Haddock, IUPU Fort Wayne
1998	Rebecca Dolan, Butler University
1999	Marion T. Jackson, Indiana State University
2000	Ruth H. Howes, Ball State University
2001	Edwin R. Squiers, Taylor University
2002	Terry West, Purdue University
2003	Robert D. Waltz, Department of Natural Resources
2004	Don Ruch, Ball State University
2005	Uwe Hansen, Indiana State University
2006	Clare Chatot, Ball State University
2007	John Schutt, Taylor University
2008	Nils I. Johansen, University of Southern Indiana
2009	Paul Rothrock, Taylor University
2010	James Curry, Franklin College
2011	Richard Kjonaas, Indiana State University
2012-13	Michael Finkler, Indiana University Kokomo
2013-14	Dale Edwards, University of Evansville
2014-15	Arden Bement, Purdue University
2015-16	Michael Homoya, Department of Natural Resources
2016-17	Darrin Rubino, Hanover College
2017-18	Horia Petrache, Indiana University–Purdue University Indianapolis (IUPUI)
2018-19	Alice Long Heikens, Franklin College
2019-20	Vanessa Quinn, Purdue University Northwest
