= List of Tri Kappa chapters =

Kappa Kappa Kappa, Inc., commonly known as Tri Kappa, is an American service sorority with chapters throughout Indiana. It was established in 1901. Tri Kappa has both active and associate chapters. Associate chapters are less active and consist of women who belonged to an active chapter for at least ten years.

== Chapters ==
Following is an incomplete list of chapters, in charter date order. Active chapters are indicated in bold and inactive chapters are in italics.

Chapter	Charter date	Location	Status	Ref.
	February 22, 1901	Girls' Classical School, Indianapolis, Indiana	Inactive	
**Alpha**	April 8, 1901	Bloomington, Indiana	Active	
Beta	April 11, 1901	New Harmony, Indiana	Inactive	
**Gamma**	July 4, 1902	Bedford, Indiana	Active	
**Delta**	November 30, 1901	Paoli, Indiana	Active	
**Epsilon**	May 26, 1903	West Lafayette, Indiana	Active	
**Zeta**	September 19, 1903	Franklin, Indiana	Active	
**Eta**	July 3, 1903	Orleans, Indiana	Active	
**Theta**	January 2, 1903	Alexandria, Indiana	Active	
**Iota**	February 3, 1903	Valparaiso, Indiana	Active	
**Kappa**	January 15, 1904	Aurora, Indiana	Active	
**Lambda**	August 5, 1904	Elwood, Indiana	Active	
**Mu**	September 11, 1904	LaGrange, Indiana	Active	
**Nu**	August 27, 1904	New Albany, Indiana	Active	
**Xi**	September 14, 1904	Anderson, Indiana	Active	
**Omicron**	May 8, 1905	Fowler, Indiana	Active	
**Pi**	May 2, 1905	Lawrenceburg, Indiana	Active	
Rho			Active	
**Sigma**	December 16, 1905	Ladoga, Indiana	Active	
**Tau**	February 17, 1906	Columbus, Indiana	Active	
**Upsilon**	March 31, 1906	Greenfield, Indiana	Active	
**Phi**	September 6, 1906	Rushville, Indiana	Active	
**Chi**	September 16, 1906	Huntington, Indiana	Active	
Psi	January 4, 1907	Union City, Indiana	Inactive	
**Omega**	February 22, 1907	Greensburg, Indiana	Active	
Alpha Alpha		East Chicago, Indiana	Inactive	
**Alpha Beta**	May 11, 1907	Lebanon, Indiana	Active	
**Alpha Gamma**	May 3, 1907	Covington, Indiana	Active	
**Alpha Delta**	August 6, 1907	Spencer, Indiana	Active	
**Alpha Epsilon**	February 8, 1908	Wabash, Indiana	Active	
**Alpha Zeta**	March 27, 1908	Knightstown, Indiana	Active	
**Alpha Eta**	June 22, 1908	Goshen, Indiana	Active	
**Alpha Theta**	June 20, 1908	Bloomfield, Indiana	Active	
Alpha Iota	March 27, 1909	Columbia City, Indiana	Inactive	
**Alpha Kappa**	May 15, 1909	Jeffersonville, Indiana	Active	
**Alpha Lamba**	November 26, 1909	Warsaw, Indiana	Active	
**Alpha Mu**	April 23, 1910	Logansport, Indiana	Active	
**Alpha Nu**	May 14, 1910	Princeton, Indiana	Active	
**Alpha Xi**	June 22, 1910	Connersville, Indiana	Active	
**Alpha Omicron**	October 7, 1910	Sullivan, Indiana	Active	
**Alpha Pi**	June 14, 1911	Auburn, Indiana	Active	
**Alpha Rho**	July 19, 1911	Elkhart, Indiana	Active	
**Alpha Sigma**	June 8, 1911	Decatur, Indiana	Active	
**Alpha Tau**	June 9, 1911	New Castle, Indiana	Active	
**Alpha Phi**	December 27, 1912	Winchester, Indiana	Active	
**Alpha Chi**	May 31, 1913	Garrett, Indiana	Active	
**Alpha Psi**	June 23, 1913	Martinsville, Indiana	Active	
**Alpha Omega**	June 5, 1914	Brazil, Indiana	Active	
Beta Alpha			Inactive	
Beta Beta			Inactive	
**Beta Gamma**	June 13, 1914	Mishawaka, Indiana	Active	
**Beta Delta**	January 2, 1915	Plymouth, Indiana	Active	
**Beta Epsilon**	March 18, 1915	Noblesville, Indiana	Active	
**Beta Zeta**	April 8, 1915	Washington, Indiana	Active	
**Beta Eta**	August 18, 1915	Brookville, Indiana	Active	
**Beta Theta**	September 3, 1915	Portland, Indiana	Active	
**Beta Iota**	November 26, 1915	Peru, Indiana	Active	
Beta Kappa	May 4, 1916	Frankfort, Indiana	Inactive	
**Beta Lambda**	August 28, 1916	Kokomo, Indiana	Active	
**Beta Mu**	May 5, 1917	Rochester, Indiana	Active	
**Beta Nu**	June 8, 1917	Clinton, Indiana	Active	
**Beta Xi**	December 21, 1917	Hartford City, Indiana	Active	
**Beta Omicron**	April 1, 1918	Tipton, Indiana	Active	
**Beta Pi**	October 4, 1918	Bicknell, Indiana	Active	
**Beta Rho**	February 21, 1919	Gary, Indiana	Active	
Beta Sigma			Inactive	
**Beta Tau**	March 5, 1919	Salem, Indiana	Active	
**Beta Upsilon**	March 27, 1920	Rensselaer, Indiana	Active	
**Beta Phi**	May 6, 1920	Bluffton, Indiana	Active	
**Beta Chi**	December 4, 1920	Corydon, Indiana	Active	
**Beta Psi**	March 24, 1921	Greencastle, Indiana	Active	
**Beta Omega**	March 26, 1921	Madison, Indiana	Active	
**Gamma Alpha**	March 30, 1921	Delphi, Indiana	Active	
**Gamma Beta**	April 9, 1921	Montpelier, Indiana	Active	
**Gamma Gamma**	April 16, 1921	Terre Haute, Indiana	Active	
**Gamma Delta**	April 16, 1921	Shelbyville, Indiana	Active	
**Gamma Epsilon**	January 7, 1922	Mitchell, Indiana	Active	
**Gamma Zeta**	April 8, 1922	Vincennes, Indiana	Active	
**Gamma Eta**	May 13, 1922	Monticello, Indiana	Active	
**Gamma Theta**	August 28, 1922	Crown Point, Indiana	Active	
**Gamma Iota**	December 27, 1922	Boonville, Indiana	Active	
**Gamma Kappa**	March 17, 1923	North Manchester, Indiana	Active	
Gamma Lambda	May 5, 1923	Fort Wayne, Indiana	Inactive	
Gamma Mu			Inactive	
**Gamma Nu**	June 14, 1924	Hammond, Indiana	Active	
**Gamma Xi**	March 21, 1925	Kendallville, Indiana	Active	
**Gamma Omicron**	April 4, 1925	French Lick, Indiana	Active	
**Gamma Pi**	June 6, 1925	Seymour, Indiana	Active	
**Gamma Rho**	August 31, 1925	Marion, Indiana	Active	
**Gamma Sigma**	November 28, 1925	Rockville, Indiana	Active	
**Gamma Tau**	March 26, 1927	Linton, Indiana	Active	
Gamma Upsilon	August 2, 1927	Warren Indiana	Inactive	(Note: Chapter formed from the pre-existing Women's Social Service Club.)
Gamma Phi	September 17, 1927	Seymour, Indiana	Inactive	
**Gamma Chi**	December 3, 1927	Vevay, Indiana	Active	
Gamma Psi	January 14, 1928	Mount Vernon, Indiana	Inactive	
**Gamma Omega**	August 29, 1928	Oakland City, Indiana	Active	
Delta Alpha			Inactive	
Delta Beta			Inactive	
Delta Gamma			Inactive	
Delta Delta			Inactive	
**Delta Epsilon**	March 30, 1929	Albany, Indiana	Active	
**Delta Zeta**	April 6, 1929	Richmond, Indiana	Active	
**Delta Eta**	April 15, 1929	Lafayette, Indiana	Active	
**Delta Theta**	December 29, 1929	Attica, Indiana	Active	
**Delta Iota**	May 17, 1930	Mooresville, Indiana	Active	
**Delta Kappa**	May 31, 1930	Danville, Indiana	Active	
**Delta Lambda**	October 18, 1930	Greenwood, Indiana	Active	
Delta Mu	December 29, 1930	Michigan City, Indiana	Inactive	
**Delta Nu**	April 1, 1933	Worthington, Indiana	Active	
**Delta Xi**	March 23, 1935	Jasonville, Indiana	Active	
**Delta Omicron**	April 10, 1937	Crawfordsville, Indiana	Active	
**Delta Pi**	November 3, 1938	Plainfield, Indiana	Active	
**Delta Rho**	April 22, 1939	Versailles and Osgood, Indiana	Active	
**Delta Sigma**	April 7, 1941	Edinburgh, Indiana	Active	
**Delta Tau**	November 29, 1941	Loogootee and Shoals, Indiana	Active	
**Delta Upsilon**	July 18, 1942	La Porte, Indiana	Active	
**Delta Phi**	August 15, 1942	Muncie, Indiana	Active	
**Delta Chi**	October 5, 1946	Jasper, Indiana	Active	
Delta Psi			Inactive	
**Delta Omega**	July 16, 1949	Griffith, Indiana	Active	
Epsilon Alpha			Inactive	
Epsilon Beta			Inactive	
Epsilon Gamma			Inactive	
Epsilon Delta			Inactive	
Epsilon Epsilon			Inactive	
**Epsilon Zeta**	November 17, 1950	Hobart, Indiana	Active	
**Epsilon Eta**	March 9, 1951	Speedway, Indiana	Active	
**Epsilon Theta**	September 22, 1951	Evansville, Indiana	Active	
**Epsilon Iota**	September 20, 1953	Kentland, Indiana	Active	
**Epsilon Kappa**	June 24, 1956	Chesterton, Indiana	Active	
**Epsilon Lambda**	July 20, 1956	South Bend, Indiana	Active	
**Epsilon Mu**	September 24, 1956	Carmel, Indiana	Active	
**Epsilon Nu**	December 14, 1959	Culver, Indiana	Active	
**Epsilon Xi**	February 10, 1960	Ellettsville, Indiana	Active	
**Epsilon Omicron**	May 13, 1960	Munster-Highland, Indiana	Active	
**Epsilon Pi**	May 16, 1960	Bremen, Indiana	Active	
Epsilon Rho			Inactive	
**Epsilon Sigma**	September 7, 1960	Crooked Creek, Indianapolis, Indiana	Active	
Epsilon Tau	September 19, 1960	Southport, Indiana	Inactive	
**Epsilon Upsilon**	October 5, 1960	Brownsburg, Indiana	Active	
**Epsilon Phi**	October 6, 1960	Brownstown, Indiana	Active	
**Epsilon Chi**	December 1, 1960	Walkerton, Indiana	Active	
**Epsilon Psi**	February 8, 1961	Rockport, Indiana	Active	
**Epsilon Omega**	February 8, 1961	Tell City, Indiana	Active	
Zeta Alpha			Inactive	
Zeta Beta			Inactive	
Zeta Gamma			Inactive	
Zeta Delta			Inactive	
Zeta Epsilon			Inactive	
Zeta Zeta			Inactive	
**Zeta Eta**	May 9, 1961	Knox, Indiana	Active	
**Zeta Theta**	May 19, 1961	Beech Grove, Indiana	Active	
**Zeta Iota**	September 11, 1961	Irvington and Indianapolis East, Indiana	Active	
Zeta Kappa			Inactive	
**Zeta Lambda**	June 29, 1965	Center Grove, Indiana	Active	
**Zeta Mu**	February 23, 1967	Portage, Indiana	Active	
**Zeta Nu**	March 31, 1967	Nappanee and Wakarusa, Indiana	Active	
**Zeta Xi**	March 31, 1967	Remington, Indiana	Active	
**Zeta Omicron**	September 6, 1968	Westville, Indiana	Active	
**Zeta Pi**	March 28, 1969	North Liberty, Indiana	Active	
**Zeta Rho**	January 17, 1971	Monon, Indiana	Active	
**Zeta Sigma**	January 28, 1973	Zionsville, Indiana	Active	
**Zeta Tau**	May 5, 1973	Mill Creek, Indiana	Active	
**Zeta Upsilon**	September 13, 1975	Angola, Indiana	Active	
**Zeta Phi**	July 30, 1975	Brown County, Indiana	Active	
**Zeta Chi**	February 7, 1976	Lowell, Indiana	Active	
**Zeta Psi**	March 19, 1977	Dyer, Schererville, and St. John, Indiana	Active	
**Zeta Omega**	November 21, 1982	Veedersburg, Indiana	Active	
Eta Alpha			Inactive	
Eta Beta			Inactive	
Eta Gamma			Inactive	
Eta Delta			Inactive	
Eta Epsilon			Inactive	
Eta Zeta			Inactive	
Eta Eta			Inactive	
**Eta Theta**	November 12, 1983	Albion, Indiana	Active	
**Eta Iota**	March 2, 1991	Fishers, Indiana	Active	
**Eta Kappa**	April 23, 2006	Avon, Indiana	Active	
**Eta Lambda**		North Vernon, Indiana	Active	
**Eta Mu**		Indianapolis Downtown, Indiana	Active	

== Associate chapters ==
Following is an incomplete list of active associate chapters, in order of location. Active chapters are indicated in bold and inactive chapters are in italics.

Chapter	Charter date	Location	Status	Ref.
Albany Associate		Albany, Indiana	Inactive	
**Alexandria Associate**		Alexandria, Indiana	Active	
**Anderson Associate**		Anderson, Indiana	Active	
Anderson Beta Associate		Anderson, Indiana	Inactive	
**Angola Associate**		Angola, Indiana	Active	
**Attica Associate**		Attica, Indiana	Active	
**Auburn Associate**		Auburn, Indiana	Active	
**Aurora Associate**		Aurora, Indiana	Active	
**Bedford Associate**		Bedford, Indiana	Active	
Bloomington Associate		Bloomington, Indiana	Inactive	
Bloomington Beta Associate		Bloomington, Indiana	Inactive	
Bloomington Gamma Associate		Bloomington, Indiana	Inactive	
**Bluffton Associate**		Bluffton, Indiana	Active	
**Boonville Associate**		Boonville, Indiana	Active	
**Brazil Associate**		Brazil, Indiana	Active	
Brazil Beta Associate		Brazil, Indiana	Inactive	
**Brookville Associate**		Brookville, Indiana	Active	
**Brownsburg Associate**		Brownsburg, Indiana	Active	
**Brownstown Associate**	1990	Brownstown, Indiana	Active	
**Carmell Associate**		Carmel, Indiana	Active	
**Chesterton Associate**		Chesterton, Indiana	Active	
**Clinton Associate**		Clinton, Indiana	Active	
**Columbia City Alpha Associate**		Columbia City, Indiana	Active	
**Columbus Alpha Associate**		Columbus, Indiana	Active	
**Connersville Alpha Associate**		Connersville, Indiana	Active	
**Corydon Associate**		Corydon, Indiana	Active	
**Covington Associate**		Covington, Indiana	Active	
Crawfordsville Associate		Crawfordsville, Indiana	Inactive	
**Crown Point Associate**		Crown Point, Indiana	Active	
**Culver Associate**		Culver, Indiana	Active	
**Danville Alpha Associate**		Danville, Indiana	Active	
**Danville Beta Associate**		Danville, Indiana	Active	
**Decatur Associate**		Decatur, Indiana	Active	
**Delphi Associate**		Delphi, Indiana	Active	
**Dyer, Schererville, and St. John Associate**		Dyer, Schererville, and St. John, Indiana	Active	
East Chicago Alpha Associate		East Chicago, Indiana	Inactive	
East Chicago Beta Associate		East Chicago, Indiana	Inactive	
**Elkhart Alpha Associate**		Elkhart, Indiana	Active	
**Elkhart Beta Associate**		Elkhart, Indiana	Active	
Elkhart Gamma Associate		Elkhart, Indiana	Inactive	
**Evansville Associate**		Evansville, Indiana	Active	
**Fishers Associate**		Fishers, Indiana	Active	
**Fort Wayne Associate**		Fort Wayne, Indiana	Active	
**Fowler Associate**		Fowler, Indiana	Active	
Frankfort Associate		Frankfort, Indiana	Inactive	
Franklin Alpha Associate		Franklin, Indiana	Inactive	
Franklin Beta Associate		Franklin, Indiana	Inactive	
**Garrett Associate**		Garrett, Indiana	Active	
**Gary Associate**		Gary, Indiana	Active	
**Goshen Associate**		Goshen, Indiana	Active	
**Greencastle Associate**		Greencastle, Indiana	Active	
**Greenfield Associate**	December 1, 1952	Greenfield, Indiana	Active	
**Greensburg Associate**	September 1947	Greensburg, Indiana	Active	
**Greenwood Associate**		Greenwood, Indiana	Active	
Greenwood Beta Associate		Greenwood, Indiana	Inactive	
Griffith Associate		Griffith, Indiana	Inactive	
**Hammond Alpha Associate**		Hammond, Indiana	Active	
Hammond Beta Associate		Hammond, Indiana	Inactive	
**Hartford City Associate**		Hartford City, Indiana	Active	
**Horbart Associate**		Hobart, Indiana	Active	
**Huntington Associate**		Huntington, Indiana	Active	
Indianapolis Alpha Associate	1915	Indianapolis, Indiana	Inactive	
**Jasonville Associate**		Jasonville, Indiana	Active	
Jasper Associate		Jasper, Indiana	Inactive	
**Jeffersonville Associate**		Jeffersonville, Indiana	Active	
**Kendallville Alpha Associate**		Kendallville, Indiana	Active	
**Kendallville Beta Associate**		Kendallville, Indiana	Active	
**Kentland Associate**		Kentland, Indiana	Active	
Knightstown Associate		Knightstown, Indiana	Inactive	
**Kokoma Alpha Associate**		Kokomo, Indiana	Active	
Lafayette Associate		Lafayette, Indiana	Inactive	
**LaGrange Associate**		LaGrange, Indiana	Active	
La Porte Associate		La Porte, Indiana	Inactive	
**Lawrenceburg Associate**		Lawrenceburg, Indiana	Active	
Lebanon Associate		Lebanon, Indiana	Inactive	
**Linton Associate**		Linton, Indiana	Active	
**Logansport Associate**		Logansport, Indiana	Active	
**Madison Associate**		Madison, Indiana	Active	
**Marion Associate**		Marion, Indiana	Active	
Marion Beta Associate		Marion, Indiana	Inactive	
**Martinsville Alpha Associate**		Martinsville, Indiana	Active	
**Martinsville Beta Associate**		Martinsville, Indiana	Active	
**Michigan City Associate**		Michigan City, Indiana	Active	
Mishawaka Associate		Mishawaka, Indiana	Inactive	
**Monticello Associate**		Monticello, Indiana	Active	
**Montpellier Associate**		Montpelier, Indiana	Active	
**Mooreville Associate**		Mooresville, Indiana	Active	
**Mount Vernon Associate**		Mount Vernon, Indiana	Active	
**Muncie Associate**		Muncie, Indiana	Active	
Muncie Beta Associate		Muncie, Indiana	Inactive	
Muncie Gamma Associate		Muncie, Indiana	Inactive	
**Munster-Highland Associate**		Munster-Highland, Indiana	Active	
Nappanee-Wakarusa Associate		Nappanee and Wakarusa, Indiana	Inactive	
**New Albany Associate**		New Albany, Indiana	Active	
**New Castle Associate**		New Castle, Indiana	Active	
**New Harmony Associate**		New Harmony, Indiana	Active	
**Noblesville Associate**		Noblesville, Indiana	Active	
**North Manchester Associate**		North Manchester, Indiana	Active	
**Orleans Associate**		Orleans, Indiana	Active	
Paoli Associate		Paoli, Indiana	Inactive	
**Pendleton Associate**		Pendleton, Indiana	Active	
Peru Associate		Peru, Indiana	Inactive	
**Plainfield Associate**		Plainfield, Indiana	Active	
**Plymouth Associate**		Plymouth, Indiana	Active	
**Portland Associate**		Portland, Indiana	Active	
**Princeton Associate**		Princeton, Indiana	Active	
**Richmond Associate**		Richmond, Indiana	Active	
Richmond Beta Associate		Richmond, Indiana	Inactive	
Richmond Gamma Associate		Richmond, Indiana	Inactive	
**Rochester Associate**		Rochester, Indiana	Active	
**Rockville Associate**		Rockville, Indiana	Active	
**Rushville Associate**		Rushville, Indiana	Active	
**Salem Associate**		Salem, Indiana	Active	
**Seymour Associate**		Seymour, Indiana	Active	
Shelbyville Associate		Shelbyville, Indiana	Inactive	
South Bend Associate		South Bend, Indiana	Inactive	
**Southport Associate**		Southport, Indiana	Active	
**Speedway Associate**		Speedway, Indiana	Active	
**Sullivan Associate**		Sullivan, Indiana	Active	
**Tell City Associate**		Tell City, Indiana	Active	
**Terre Haute Associate**		Terre Haute, Indiana	Active	
Valparaiso Alpha Associate		Valparaiso, Indiana	Inactive	
Valparaiso Beta Associate		Valparaiso, Indiana	Inactive	
**Versailles-Osgood Associate**		Versailles-Osgood, Indiana	Active	
Vevay Associate		Vevay, Indiana	Inactive	
**Vincennes Associate**		Vincennes, Indiana	Active	
Warren Associate		Warren, Indiana	Inactive	
**Warsaw Associate**		Warsaw, Indiana	Active	
Warsaw Beta Associate		Warsaw, Indiana	Inactive	
**Washington Associate**		Washington, Indiana	Active	
**West Lafayette Associate**	1965	West Lafayette, Indiana	Active	
West Lafayette Beta Associate		West Lafayette, Indiana	Inactive	
**Zionsville Associate**		Zionsville, Indiana	Active	
