= Tuck Langland =

American sculptor

Langland sculpture at Indiana University South Bend

Tuck Langland is a sculptor who as of 2026 lives in Granger, Indiana. His monument-size bronze figures are featured in hospitals, churches, private collections, museums, sculpture gardens, and dozens of other places. He is perhaps best known for his two popular books, Practical Sculpture and From Clay to Bronze. Langland is the former Vice President of the National Sculpture Society. In addition to a sculpture career, Langland is the creator of the Tuck Langland Collection of slides of gothic architecture in England and France, housed at Princeton University.

Langland, who made the Herman B Wells statue, also created a sculpture of Ernie Pyle which sits outside of Franklin Hall at Indiana University Bloomington.

In 2013, Langland won the national award from National Sculpture Society (NSS) of New York City.
