= East Technical High School =

Public high school in Cleveland, Ohio, US

Location
- 2439 E 55th Street; Cleveland, (Cuyahoga County), Ohio 44104; United States; 41°29′32″N 81°39′0″W

Information
- Type: Public high school
- School district: Cleveland Metropolitan School District
- Superintendent: Dr. Warren Morgan
- Teaching staff: 30.00 (FTE)
- Grades: 9-12
- Student to teacher ratio: 14.20
- Colors: Brown and Gold
- Athletics conference: Senate League
- Team name: Scarabs
- Website: https://easttech.clevelandmetroschools.org/

East Technical High School or East Tech is a secondary school under the operation of the Cleveland Metropolitan School District in Cleveland, Ohio.

== History ==
The school, when it opened on October 5, 1908, was the first public trade school in the city and reported to be only one of five in the United States. The first principal was James F. Barker (1906–1911) from Muskegon, Michigan.

In 1952, East Technical merged with Central High School. Central High was the first public high school in Cleveland and the first free secondary education institution west of the Allegheny Mountains paid for by taxpayers.

East Tech utilizes the small school system. Three small schools are located within East Tech: Ninth Grade Academy, Community Wrap Around, and Engineering Science & Technology

== Athletics ==
The school was a sports powerhouse in the city, winning numerous titles in football, basketball and track and field. Some notable alumni include Olympic Games athletic stars such as Jesse Owens, Harrison Dillard , and Dave Albritton. The original building stood for some 64 years until a new building was dedicated and moved into on October 11, 1972. The current structure now sits at the corner of E.55th and Quincy Ave on the east side of Cleveland. The original building has since been demolished.

=== Ohio High School Athletic Association State Championships ===
- Track - 1920, 1921, 1932, 1933, 1936, 1939, 1940, 1941, 1942, 1943, 1944, 1947*, 1949*, 1952, 1955
- Swimming - 1947, 1948
- Basketball – 1958, 1959, 1972
- Girls Basketball – 2002
- Boys Gymnastics - 1933, 1934, 1935, 1936, 1937

 *1947 and 1949 Track titles won by Central High School prior to consolidation with East Tech.

=== FIRST In Ohio State Championships ===
- FIRST In Ohio - 2024

== Notable alumni ==
- Bob Brown, former NFL offensive tackle, member of the College Football Hall of Fame and Pro Football Hall of Fame.
- Vivian Brown, Olympic sprinter
- Charles F. Brush, engineer, inventor, electric pioneer and founder of a predecessor firm of General Electric (graduate of Central High).
- Harrison Dillard (1923-2019), track and field athlete, Olympic gold medalist for the 100m dash
- John Favors, guru and commissioner of International Society for Krishna Consciousness
- Wanda Ford, college basketball player
- Benny Friedman (1905-1982), Hall of Fame NFL football quarterback
- William Otto Frohring, biochemist, inventor, business executive. Co-inventor of SMA, the first commercial infant formula.
- Larry Johnson, former MLB baseball player (Cleveland Indians, Montreal Expos, Chicago White Sox)
- Markell Johnson (born 1998), professional basketball player in the Israeli Basketball Premier League
- Robert P. Kingsbury, New Hampshire House of Representatives
- Polykarp Kusch, recipient of 1955 Nobel Prize in Physics
- Everett Lee, orchestra conductor
- Mother Love, entertainer
- Robert P. Madison, architect
- Toccara Montgomery, 2004 Olympian for women's wrestling
- Jesse Owens (1913-1980), track and field athlete, Olympic gold medalist in the 100m dash
- Roger Peckinpaugh (1891-1977), MLB baseball player and manager
- Wee Willie Smith (1911-1992), professional basketball player
- Doris Smith-Ribner, judge
- Nate Schenker (1918– 2009), NFL tackle for the Cleveland Rams
- Edwin Starr, musician
- Mike St. Clair, NFL football player
- Carl Stokes, 51st Mayor of Cleveland
- Stanley Tolliver, attorney
- Jack Trice, American football player, first African-American athlete at Iowa State College (now Iowa State University).
- Barbara Turner (born 1984), women's basketball WNBA player, Seattle Storm, Botaş SK former Connecticut University player
- Joe Vosmik (1910-1962), MLB baseball player (Cleveland Indians, St. Louis Browns, Boston Red Sox, Brooklyn Dodgers, Washington Senators)
- Harold Zisla (1925-2016), educator and abstract expressionist artist
