= Harold Zisla =

American artist (1925–2016)

- Born: June 28, 1925; Cleveland, Ohio, U.S.
- Died: March 18, 2016 (aged 90); South Bend, Indiana, U.S.
- Education: Cleveland Institute of Art; Case Western Reserve University
- Known for: Abstract painting
- Movement: Abstract Expressionism
- Awards: Sagamore of the Wabash (1985)

Harold Zisla (June 28, 1925 – March 18, 2016) was an American abstract expressionist painter and art educator. In 1968 he became the founding chair of the Fine Arts Department at Indiana University South Bend, where he taught until his retirement in 1989.

== Early life ==
Zisla was born in Cleveland, Ohio. During his youth he took art classes at the Cleveland Museum of Art (1932–1937), and he studied with painter Paul B. Travis at Council Educational Alliance (1938–40). In 1940 he won a scholarship to Young Artist Classes at the Cleveland Museum of Art, where he took classes with Milton S. Fox, a painter and art historian who later served as editor-in-chief and vice president of Harry N. Abrams Inc., an art book publisher.

Zisla earned his high school diploma from East Technical High School in Cleveland in 1943. Following high school, he served in the United States Navy until 1946. He graduated from the Cleveland School of Art with a diploma in painting in 1950. The same year, he received his B.S. in art education at Western Reserve University. The following year he earned his M.S. in art education. He moved to South Bend, Indiana, in 1952, where he worked first as an industrial designer at Uniroyal.

== Career ==
He directed the South Bend Art Center (now the South Bend Museum of Art) from 1957 to 1966, prior to accepting the professorship at what was then called the South Bend-Mishawaka Campus of Indiana University. Four-year degree programs had just been authorized in 1965, and Zisla had the responsibility of hiring new faculty.

Zisla was long active in service to community arts in the Michiana region. Following his tenure as executive director, he served on the South Bend Art Center board of trustees. He also served on the acquisitions committee of Purdue University, the Advisory Board of the Gallery at Saint Mary's College, and the Mayor's Committee to Build a Cultural Complex.

Zisla said about painting that it "should be, more than anything else, a liberation into the spirit of the artist, and to have presence, impact, dynamism, freedom from the trite, the contrived, the boringly dead." Paintings, he said, "must be alive.”

Harold Zisla married Doreen on August 13, 1946. They have two children, Paul Zisla and Beverly Welber.

The Harold and Doreen Zisla Art Scholarship has been established at Indiana University South Bend to support graduate and undergraduate students whose work displays an interest in experimental art.

== Selected solo exhibits ==
- 1965 Indiana University South Bend (IUSB)
- 1968 South Bend Museum of Art (SBMA)
- 1969 Niles Art Center, Niles, Michigan
- 1979 In Celebration, SBMA
- 1980 Retrospective Images: Icons and Indices, Saint Anselm College, Manchester, New Hampshire
- 1981 Faces, Figures, Flowers: An Exhibition of Paintings and Drawings, IUSB
- 1982 Harold Zisla: Recent Works, Midwest Museum of American Art, Elkhart, Indiana
- 1985 Accumulations: Harold Zisla Retrospective, SBMA
- 1990 Either/Or: New Works, SBMA
- 1991 Simplicity Complexity = Complexity Simplicity, IUSB
- 1995 Paintings and Drawings, Lakeside Gallery, Lakeside, Michigan
- 1996 Harold Zisla: Recent Paintings, SBMA
- 1998 Portraits, etc., IUSB
- 2000 Newest Works: Summations, SBMA
- 2005 Celebration: Harold Zisla, Blue Gallery, Three Oaks, Michigan
- 2008 Fertile Densities, IUSB
- 2009 Zisla: Paintings and Works on Paper, New Galleries, South Bend
- 2013 Gestural Images Deepened, Buchanan Art Center, Buchanan, Michigan

== Selected group exhibitions ==
- 1948 The May Show, Cleveland Museum of Art
- 1959 Regional Art Exhibition, Kalamazoo Institute of Arts, Kalamazoo, Michigan
- 1960 Indiana Art Exhibition, John Herron Art Institute, Indianapolis, Indiana
- 1967 Talbot Gallery, Indianapolis
- 1969 London Graphica Gallery, Petoskey, Michigan
- 1973 Artist and Model: Three Views, SBMA
- 1976 St. Joseph Art Association, St. Joseph, Michigan
- 1980 Indiana State Museum, Indianapolis
- 1980-81 Four Figurative Artists, University Art Galleries, Valparaiso University, Valparaiso, Indiana; Krasl Art Center, St. Joseph, Michigan; SBMA; Lafayette Art Center, Lafayette, Indiana; Anderson Fine Arts Center, Anderson, Indiana
- 1984 The Act of Drawing: An Exhibition of Contemporary Drawings, SBMA
- 1987 Choices: Twenty Painters from the Midwest, Minneapolis College of Art and Design, Minneapolis, Minnesota
- 2000 Fall Promega Art Showcase, BioPharmaceutical Technology Center, Madison, Wisconsin

== Books ==
- Provocative Lines: Drawings by Harold Zisla (2020)
- Fine Arts of the South Bend Region, 1840-2000, Walter R. Collins, editor (Wolfson Press 2014)

== Awards ==
- 1985 First Eldon Lundquist Faculty Fellow, Indiana University South Bend, the highest faculty award at the South Bend campus
- 1985 Sagamore of the Wabash (Conferred by the Governor of Indiana Robert D. Orr. This award is the highest distinction in the state. Indiana's Native American tribes used the term to indicate a "lesser chief or a great man among the tribe whom the chief consulted for wisdom and advice." The award states that the recipient is "distinguished by his Humanity in Living, his Loyalty in Friendship, his Wisdom in Council, and his Inspiration in Leadership.")
- 1990 South Bend Alumni Association's Community Hall of Fame
- 1997 South Bend Mayor's Arts Award (For cultural contributions to the community)
