= William Otto Frohring =

- Born: July 1, 1893; Cleveland, Ohio
- Died: September 13, 1959 (aged 66); Newbury, Ohio
- Known for: co-developer of "simulated milk adapted" (SMA)

William Otto Frohring (July 1, 1893 – September 13, 1959) was an American biochemical researcher, inventor and business executive. He was a co-developer of "simulated milk adapted" (SMA), the first infant formula to be distributed in the United States and one of the most widely consumed infant formulas in the world. Frohring held 15 patents, and led research in dairy products, and the refinement, synthesis and manufacture of vitamin products.

== Early life ==
William Frohring was born in Cleveland, Ohio, the son of William Erhardt Frohring, a railroad engineer, and Martha Louise Bliss. He graduated from East Technical High School in Cleveland. After graduation, he worked as a motorcycle mechanic at the Luna Park, Cleveland Motordrome. In 1911, he received a two-year scholarship to Ohio State Agricultural College, where he majored in bacteriology and dairy technology. He graduated in 1915.

== Work with Gerstenberger ==
Frohring took a job on the loading dock at Telling-Belle Vernon Dairy, the largest dairy in Ohio. Eight months later, he was offered an opportunity to run fat tests in the Telling-Belle Vernon labs for Henry J. Gerstenberger, MD, the medical director of Babies Dispensary and Children's Hospital (later, Rainbow Babies & Children's Hospital), a pediatric hospital in Cleveland. Dr. Gerstenberger, with the assistance of Harold O. Ruh, MD, was investigating the possibility of developing a dairy formula to supplement or replace maternal milk for infants.

== Development of SMA ==
William Frohring was brought on as part of the team with Gerstenberger and Ruh, and eventually became chief chemist on the project. The group's formula was based on diluted skimmed milk, with lactose and potassium chloride added to reach the human milk level. Among their novel contributions was to use mixtures of fats and oils rather than cream to duplicate human milk fat.

Experimental batches of SMA distributed to local pediatricians were well received. The group began getting orders for more. Frohring stepped forward as the business leader of the group. His idea was to give the patent of the formula to Babies Dispensary and Children's Hospital, and license the manufacture to Telling-Belle Vernon Dairy.

By 1919, Frohring was director of the laboratory at Telling-Belle Vernon Dairy, and had invented several pieces of laboratory and dairy processing equipment. In 1921, he was made a director and placed in charge of Laboratory Products Company, the company's new subsidiary to manufacture SMA, located in Mason, Michigan.

Laboratory Products Company diversified into the development of research into other newly identified biochemicals. Frohring recruited Albert Fredrick Ottomar Germann to study carotene. The company went on to become the world's major supplier of carotene.

As an employee of the dairy, Frohring accumulated patents on a process for the production of soluble casein, an improved process for lactose production, a vitamin C concentrate from orange and tomato juice for addition to SMA, and a formulation called "Frohs Malted Chocolate Milk". The company was renamed the SMA Corporation, and added carotene concentrate, refined from palm oil, to its product line. Frohring set up a company to process the palm oil. He made his younger brother Paul (formerly sales manager for SMA Corporation), president and general manager. In 1939, SMA, its subsidiary, and all rights to the infant formula were purchased by American Home Products Corporation (AHPC). Frohring stayed on as president of the SMA Corporation, now owned by AHPC. He later became a director of AHPC.

== Other inventions ==
In the early 1950s, Frohring received patents for Frohring Cement Mixers, a line of compact, portable mixers than can be moved out to a field and operated by hand, electric motor, gasoline motor or tractor motor. In 1953, Frohring patented a neurological research device known as a biothesiometer, used to determine a patient's sensitivity to vibration. Other patents include a formula for hypo-alergic milk, a process of making liquid malted milk, and a method for determining vitamin A deficiency, and a method for extracting carotene.

He was made an honorary doctor of science by McKinley-Roosevelt College in Chicago, Illinois.

== Personal ==
Frohring's father, William, a railroad engineer, was born in Bavaria and immigrated to the United States at 1 years old, while his mother, Martha, was born in Ohio to German emigrants. He was married to the former Gertrude Lewis, and had four children. He died of a heart attack at his home on Munn Road in Newbury, Ohio.
