= Lester M. Wolfson =

Chancellor

1st Chancellor of Indiana University South Bend
- In office 1969–1987
- Succeeded by: Daniel Cohen

Personal details
- Born: September 13, 1923 Evansville, Indiana
- Died: February 10, 2017 (aged 93) South Bend, Indiana
- Education: University of Michigan

Lester M. Wolfson (September 13, 1923 – February 10, 2017) was the founding and longest-serving chancellor at the Indiana University South Bend from 1969 to 1987. He led the regional IU campus until his retirement in 1987 and is credited for its current development. Wolfson was born in Evansville, Indiana, and was raised in Grand Rapids, Michigan. In 1987 Governor of Indiana Robert D. Orr named Wolfson a Sagamore of the Wabash, the highest honor awarded in the state. He is the subject of Patrick Furlong's book A Campus Becoming.

== Early career ==
Wolfson received his Bachelor's, Master's, and Ph.D. (in 19th-century English literature) from the University of Michigan. As an undergraduate, he was the winner of a Hopwood Award. He graduated Phi Beta Kappa. He became a professor, teaching at Wayne State University, the University of Houston, Indiana's Northwest Campus in Gary, and the University of Chicago's Downtown Center. He was a visiting professor at the University of California, Santa Barbara. In 1964, Wolfson was Associate Professor of English at IU Gary (now IU Northwest) during the time he was selected as director and dean of IU programs in South Bend.

Wolfson became chancellor in 1969, just two years after the campus began granting its first degrees.

== Time as Chancellor ==
As Chancellor, Wolfson fostered the growth and development of IU South Bend, overseeing the school's transition from a two-year college, where graduates were expected to finish their degrees at the Bloomington campus or at Indiana University Indianapolis, to a full-fledged university independently offering bachelor's and master's degrees. When Wolfson arrived in South Bend, the campus had no degree programs, one building, and 21 faculty members—including himself. However, under his tenure, enrollment grew from 2,000 to 6,000 (currently 8,000), and the physical facilities expanded from one building to eight. Under his guidance, IU South Bend was the first IU campus to offer a Master's in Liberal Studies, fostering the growth of the College of Liberal Arts and Sciences program. Seventy-five associate's, bachelor's, and master's specializations were established, with the first degrees being granted locally in 1967.

Under his leadership, the Northern Indiana Consortium for Education was formed through a grant from Lilly Endowment. He gave numerous speeches on behalf of the South Bend Community School Corporation and presented others to the Indiana Fellowship of the Society for Values in Higher Education at St. Mary's College.

In his active years at IUSB, he served on several major boards devoted to cultural, social, economic, health, and educational causes. He was also selected as President of the Michiana Arts and Sciences Council.

Wolfson, also an avid theatre and music enthusiast, fostered the growth of the performing arts department at IU South Bend by stressing its importance to both the university and the community. During his tenure, Wolfson presided over the rapid growth of IU Sound Bend's building stock, including the Schurz Library, for which Wolfson lobbied.

Utilizing his 19th-century English literature background, Wolfson wrote many analytical pieces discussing literature in IU South Bend's Newspaper, The Preface. He wrote several book reviews in the South Bend Tribune's literary section, "The Reading Lamp." He also had correspondence with Herman B. Wells and Richard Nixon.

== Retirement ==
Wolfson retired as Chancellor of Indiana University South Bend in 1987. Since that time, he did occasional teaching at IUSB and the Forever Learning Institute, where he served as an advisor to several trusts and social service groups. He also served as a board member of the Indiana University Society for Advanced Study. The Master of Liberal Arts Program named its publishing arm—Wolfson Press—in honor of the former chancellor. Wolfson received an honorary degree in Humane Letters from Indiana University South Bend in 1988. The degree was presented to him by IU President Thomas Ehrlich at commencement ceremonies in South Bend. After he retired, the pivotal role he played in developing the campus and laying the foundation for its future growth was detailed in the book A Campus Becoming: Lester M. Wolfson and Indiana University South Bend 1964-1987, published by Wolfson Press in 2010.

He died on February 10, 2017.

== Awards ==
- 1974 United Negro College Fund Distinguished Service Citation Award
- 1975 Award of Appreciation from IUSB Women's Club
- (Undated) Key to Mishawaka
- (Undated) Association of American Colleges Award
- 1987 Sagamore of the Wabash
- 1991 South Bend Alumni Hall of Fame
