= Joseph Howard Mathews =

American physical chemist (1881-1970)

Joseph Howard Mathews (October 15, 1881 – April 15, 1970) was an American physical chemist, university professor, and expert on firearm identification. Mathews was Chair of the Department of Chemistry at the University of Wisconsin–Madison for 33 years (1919–1952).

== Early life and education ==
Mathews was raised on a dairy farm near the unincorporated community of Auroraville, Wisconsin in Waushara County, Wisconsin. As a youth, he had little interest in farm life or in the cheese factory operated by his older brother. His parents sent Joseph to public school in nearby Berlin, a city that straddles the boundary between Waushara and Green Lake counties. He graduated from Omro High School (Omro, Winnebago County). Mathews studied briefly at Ripon College in Ripon, Wisconsin, and then transferred to the University of Wisconsin. Mathews earned the B.S. in chemistry in 1903, writing a senior thesis on nitrosyl selenic acid, based on research under the supervision of Victor Lenher (1873–1927).

== Career and research ==
After a short stint as an analytical chemist at the consulting firm of H. S. Mitchell in Milwaukee, Mathews returned to Madison as a graduate student of physical chemist Louis Albrecht Kahlenberg (1870–1941), Chair of the Department of Chemistry. Kahlenberg, a graduate of the University of Wisconsin, had been a doctoral student in Leipzig of Friedrich Wilhelm Ostwald (1853–1932), one of the founders of the field of physical chemistry. Mathews' research correlated electrical conductivity and chemical activity. He received the M.Sc. in 1905. Mathews then went to Harvard to study with Theodore William Richards (1868–1928). While Richards was on leave as an exchange professor at the University of Berlin, Mathews obtained a temporary instructorship in physical and industrial chemistry at Case School of Applied Science in Cleveland. Mathews returned to Harvard in 1907, completing his doctorate in 1908 with T. W. Richards. He then became an Instructor of Physical Chemistry. Kahlenberg gave lectures in the Physical Chemistry course, and Mathews taught the laboratory.

Mathews began to develop a physical chemistry laboratory course that was to become standard in chemistry curricula throughout the United States. Mathews tried new laboratory exercises whose directions he had mimeographed to supplement the Getman lab manual. Mathews later collaborated with Wisconsin colleagues Farrington Daniels (1889–1972) and John Warren Williams (1898–1988) to publish Experimental Physical Chemistry (New York: McGraw-Hill Book Company, 1929; 475 pages). That book, in seven editions and with added authors from the Wisconsin chemistry faculty, was the market leader among physical chemistry laboratory textbooks until the 1970s. McGraw-Hill published all editions. One of Mathew's first graduate students was Albert Fredrick Ottomar Germann (1886–1976). Germann’s M.Sc. thesis provided instructions for one of Mathews' new student experiments.

Mathews was the third Chair of the Chemistry Department. He was preceded by analytical chemist William Willard Daniells (1840–1912) who served from 1880 to 1907, and by physical chemist Louis Albrecht Kahlenberg (1870–1941) who served from 1907 to 1919. Mathews was followed by physical chemist Farrington Daniels (1889–1972) who served from 1952 to 1959.

Mathews had the central role in making Wisconsin a center for physical chemical research on colloidal systems. He organized the first national symposium on colloid chemistry, held in June 1923 in Madison. Mathews was instrumental in bringing Theodor ("The," pronounced "Tay") Svedberg (1884–1971) from Uppsala University to Madison as a Visiting Professor in 1923. With graduate student J. Burton Nichols, The Svedberg constructed an optical sedimentation centrifuge that was the precursor of the ultracentrifuge. Svedberg was awarded the Nobel Prize in Chemistry in 1926. Fruitful collaboration between Svedberg and Wisconsin chemists continued for decades. Charles C. Watson and John Warren Williams each spent a year in Uppsala. Watson became a doctoral student with Williams, and helped install an ultracentrifuge at duPont, the first in the United States. Watson then was in charge of installing an ultracentrifuge in Madison, the first in an American university. Williams formed a colloid chemistry research group in Madison, including doctoral students Robert Arnold Alberty and Louis Gosting.

Mathews was a member of the Madison Fire and Police Commission. This interest stemmed from a crime scene investigation during which he was asked to verify a common source for metal fragments found at the scene. In 1938 he began teaching a new course, "Identification of the Criminal by Scientific Methods" (Sociology 165). After retirement, his active research was on the laboratory examination of small arms, and rifling characteristics in hand guns. This research resulted in a two-volume book with many illustrations. An expanded edition was published posthumously. He enjoyed detective work, once thwarting thefts of potable 95% ethyl alcohol from the chemistry labs by creating a new label: "Poison. Contains methyl carbinol."

The chemistry fraternity Alpha Chi Sigma was organized by a group of nine undergraduates, meeting in Mathews' Madison rooming house. He was a senior chemistry major, three others were seniors, and five were juniors. The formal organizational meeting was on December 11, 1902. Mathews was the first President. From 1908 to 1914, Mathews was Grand Master Alchemist. When Mathews was teaching at Case School of Applied Science, he established a chapter there. Other chapters were organized at the University of Minnesota and at Indiana University. With enthusiastic support from Mathews, 47 chapters had been formed by 1918. In 2017, there were 49 active collegiate chapters.

== Personal life ==
Mathews married Ella Gillfillan (B.A. 1907, University of Wisconsin) on June 26, 1909. They had two children: Marian and Jean. Marian married M. H. Withey of Madison. Jean married Charles C. Watson, a collaborator with her father and with John Warren Williams in establishing the colloid chemistry research group at the University of Wisconsin.
