= Edward Leamington Nichols =

American physicist (1854–1937)

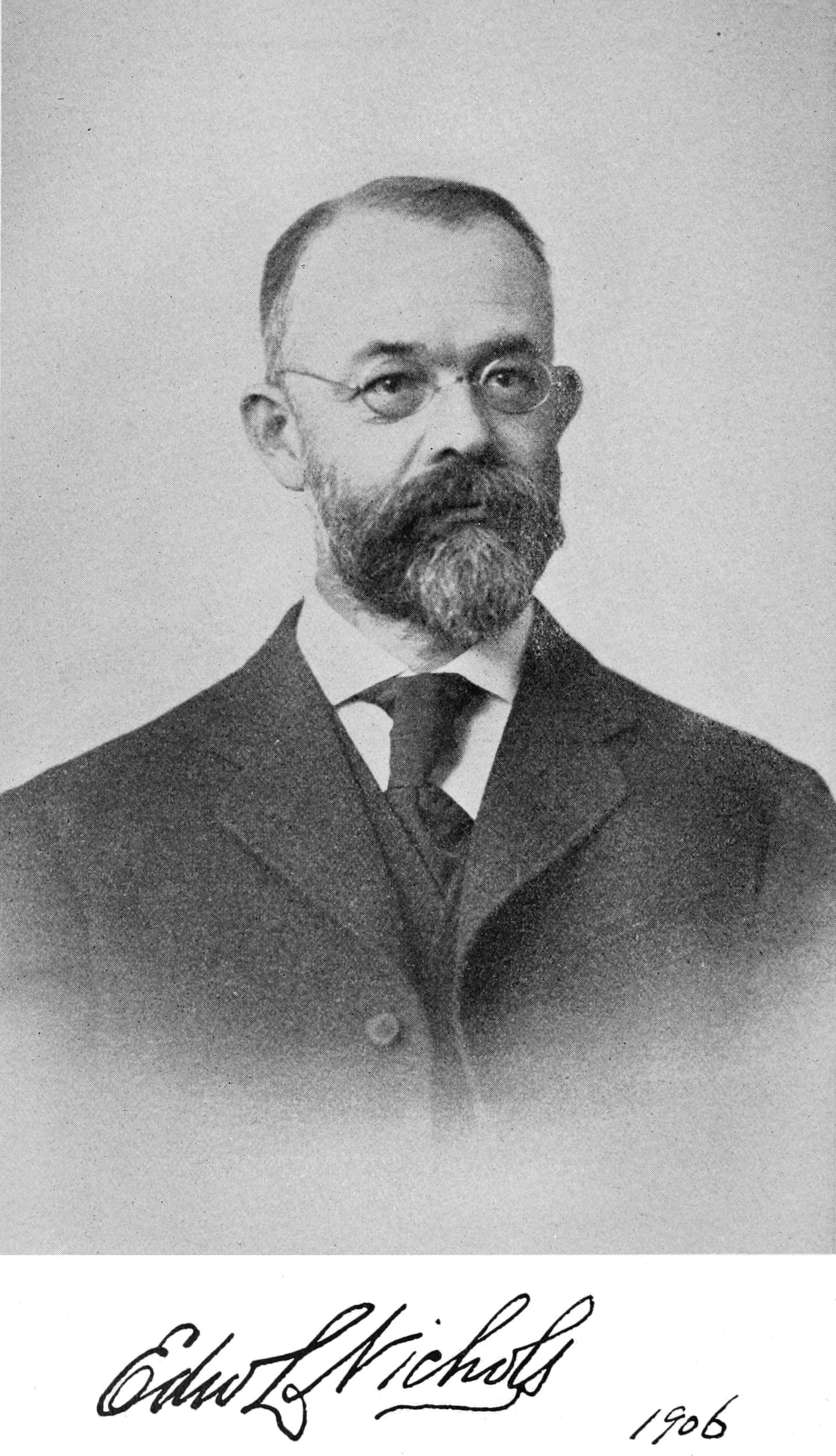
- Born: September 14, 1854; Leamington, England
- Died: November 10, 1937 (aged 83); West Palm Beach, Florida, U.S.
- Awards: Elliott Cresson Medal (1927)
- Scientific career
- Fields: Physics
- Workplaces: Johns Hopkins University; Thomas Edison laboratory Central University of Kentucky; University of Kansas; Cornell University; AAAS; American Physical Society; NIST
- Doctoral advisor: Johann Benedict Listing
- Other academic advisors: Hermann von Helmholtz; Gustav Kirchhoff
- Doctoral students: Ernest Fox Nichols

Edward Leamington Nichols (September 14, 1854 – November 10, 1937) was an American scientist. He was a physicist and astronomer, professor of physics at Cornell University.

== Biography ==
He was born of American parentage at Leamington, England, and received his education at Cornell University, graduating in 1875. After Studying at Leipzig, Berlin, and Göttingen (Ph.D., 1879) he was appointed fellow in physics at Johns Hopkins. He then spent some time in the Thomas Edison laboratory at Menlo Park, New Jersey, and subsequently became professor of physics and chemistry in the Central University of Kentucky (1881), professor of physics and astronomy at the University of Kansas (1883), and professor of physics at Cornell University (1887).

In 1904, he was elected as a member to the American Philosophical Society. He was elected a member of the National Academy of Sciences, was president of the American Association for the Advancement of Science (1907) and of the American Physical Society (1907–08), an Honorary Member of The Optical Society of America (1916), and served as a member of the visiting committee of the United States Bureau of Standards. The degrees of LL.D. and Sc.D. were conferred on Professor Nichols by the University of Pennsylvania and Dartmouth College respectively. He was the author of several college textbooks on physics. In 1927 he was awarded the Franklin Institute's Elliott Cresson Medal. In 1929 he was awarded the first Frederic Ives Medal by the OSA.

He was adviser of numerous outstanding scientists in Cornell University including Ernest Nichols, Arthur Foley, Rolla Roy Ramsey, and Floyd R. Watson. His Ph.D adviser was Johann Benedict Listing in Georg-August-Universität Göttingen.

== Writings ==
- A laboratory manual of physics and applied electricity v. 1 (New York : Macmillan, 1894)
- A laboratory manual of physics and applied electricity v. 2 (New York : Macmillan, 1894)
- The galvanometer : a series of lectures ( New York : McIlroy & Emmet, 1894)
- The elements of physics. A college text-book v. 1. Mechanics and heat (New York : Macmillan, 1896)
- The elements of physics. A college text-book v. 2. Electricity and magnetism (New York : Macmillan, 1896)
- The elements of physics. A college text-book v. 3. Light and sound (New York : Macmillan, 1896)
- The outlines of physics: an elementary text-book (New York : Macmillan, 1897)
- Questions and exercises to be used in connection with Outlines of physics, an elementary text-book (New York : Macmillan, 1897)
- Studies in luminescence ( Washington DC, Carnegie Institution, 1912)
- Fluorescence of the uranyl salts ( Washington DC, Carnegie Institution, 1919)
