= Frances Sherwood =

American writer, novelist, and educator (born 1940)

- Born: June 4, 1940; Washington, D.C., U.S.
- Died: April 27, 2021 (aged 80); South Bend, Indiana, U.S.
- Education: Howard University; Brooklyn College (BA); New York University; Johns Hopkins University (MA); Stanford University
- Occupations: Novelist; author; educator
- Writing career
- Language: English
- Years active: 1968-2021
- Notable awards: 3: Stegner Fellow in Fiction, Stanford University, 1976; Visiting Fellow at Yaddo, 1986; O. Henry Awards, 1989, 1992

Frances Sherwood (June 4, 1940 – April 27, 2021) was an American writer, novelist, and educator. Sherwood published four novels and one book of short stories. Her 1992 novel, Vindication, was nominated for the National Book Critics Circle Award. It has been translated into twelve languages.

== Biography ==
Born June 4, 1940, in Washington, DC, and raised in Monterey, California, Sherwood was the daughter of William and Barbara Sherwood. She married photographer Fred Slaski in 1995. Sherwood had three children from a previous marriage to Reynold Madoo. Reynold Madoo is from Trinidad and was a student with her at Howard University in the early 1960s. They were married for over 20 years.

Sherwood attended Howard University in the early 1960s on an Agnes and Eugene Meyer Scholarship before earning her B.A. from Brooklyn College in 1967. She then pursued graduate study at New York University. She earned an M.A. in creative writing at The Johns Hopkins University in 1975. She continued the study of fiction writing at Stanford University after winning a Stegner Fellowship in 1976 (as Frances Madoo).

Sherwood's first book-length publication was a short story collection, Everything You’ve Heard Is True (1989). She went on to publish four novels: Vindication (1992), Green (1995), The Book of Splendor (2002) and Night of Sorrows (2006). Sherwood had two stories included in O. Henry Award collections (1989, 1992) and one story in The Best American Short Stories (2000, selected by E. L. Doctorow). Twenty-four of her short stories have been published in magazines, including The Atlantic Monthly ("Basil the Dog," September 1999), Zoetrope, and TriQuarterly. "Basil the Dog" was nominated for a Nebula Award for Best Short Story in 1999.

In 1986, Sherwood was hired as an assistant professor of English at Indiana University South Bend, where she taught creative writing and journalism. She was promoted to professor of English in 1994.

Frances Sherwood said she considered herself a "new historical" novelist, a writer who displaces current political and psychological issues onto earlier times and exotic locales.

Sherwood died on April 27, 2021, in South Bend, Indiana.

== Bibliography ==
=== Novels ===
- Vindication (novel), Farrar, Straus (New York, NY), 1993. ISBN 978-0393325386
- Green (novel), Farrar, Straus (New York, NY), 1995. ISBN 978-0374166731
- The Book of Splendor (novel), W.W. Norton (New York, NY), 2002. ISBN 978-0393324587
- Night of Sorrows, W.W. Norton (New York, NY), 2006. ISBN 978-0393058253

=== Story collections ===
- Everything You've Heard Is True (short stories), Johns Hopkins University Press (Baltimore, MD), 1989. ISBN 978-0801838231

=== Anthologies ===
- "History," in Prize Stories 1989: The O. Henry Awards, William Abraham, ed., Anchor Books, 1989. ISBN 9780385246347
- "Demiurges," in Prize Stories 1992: The O. Henry Awards, William Abraham, ed., Anchor Books, 1992. ISBN 9780385421928
- "Basil the Dog," in The Best American Short Stories 2000, Katrina Kenison and E.L. Doctorow, eds., Mariner Books, 2000. ISBN 9780395926864
- "History," in So the Story Goes: Twenty-Five Years of the Johns Hopkins Short Fiction Series, John T. Irwin and Jean McGarry, eds., Johns Hopkins UP, 2005. ISBN 9780801881787
