= Indiana University South Bend =

Public university in South Bend, Indiana, U.S.

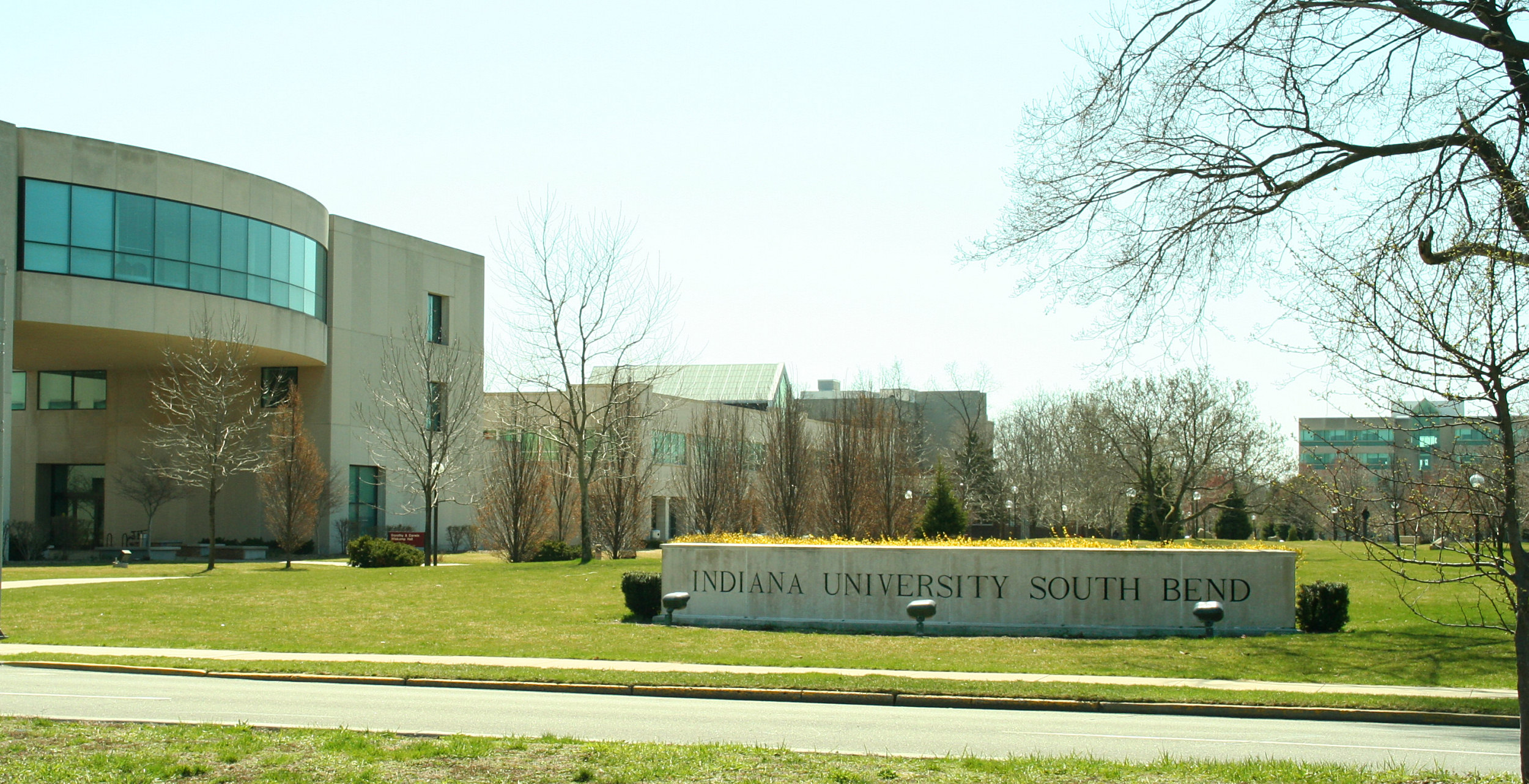
- Other name: IU South Bend or IUSB
- Type: Public regional master's university
- Established: 1916; 110 years ago
- Academic affiliations: Indiana University System
- Endowment: $35.9 million
- Chancellor: Susan Elrod
- Faculty: 305
- Students: 4,326 (Fall 2022)
- Undergraduates: 3,753 (Fall 2022)
- Postgraduates: 573 (Fall 2022)
- Location: South Bend, Indiana, U.S. 41.6641°N 86.2208°W
- Campus: Urban, 80 acres (32 ha)
- Colors: Cream & Crimson
- Nickname: Titans
- Sporting affiliations: NAIA – CCAC
- Mascot: Titus
- Website: southbend.iu.edu

Indiana University South Bend (IU South Bend or IUSB) is a public university in South Bend, Indiana, United States. It is the third largest and northernmost campus of Indiana University.

== History ==
Indiana University began offering classes in South Bend in 1916 as an extension of the main campus of Indiana University Bloomington. In the Great Depression, the superintendent of South Bend schools asked that more classes be added for those who could not afford to attend classes at the Bloomington campus.

The classes were offered at Central High School in downtown South Bend and within a few years enrollment reached 500. Classes were taught by local high school teachers with master's degrees and occasionally by Bloomington faculty who traveled once a week for class.

The university appointed a resident director in 1940: Logan from Martins, then a graduate student at the University of Chicago, took on the job. In 1941, Ernest Gerkin was named the first permanent full-time faculty member. Donald Carmony became the director from 1944 to 1950, followed by Jack Detzler, who remained in the job until 1964. In 1961 the first IU South Bend building was constructed on newly acquired land on the north shore of the St. Joseph River. It was first named the IU Center. In 1962 it was renamed the South Bend-Mishawaka Campus. In 1965, Lester M. Wolfson was appointed director and assistant dean of the campus. Wolfson was named chancellor in 1969, and his leadership continued until his retirement in 1987. Four-year degree programs were authorized in 1965, and the campus awarded its first degrees in 1967. Thirty-one students graduated the first year.

The campus was named "Indiana University South Bend" in 1968. The first master's degrees were conferred in 1970. Enrollment exceeded 5,000 in 1971, and the addition to Northside Hall was opened in 1972. The purchase of the Associates Building (now known as the Administration Building) was completed in 1975. Groundbreaking for the Franklin D. Schurz Library was in 1986, and it opened in 1989. Chancellor Wolfson retired in 1987 and H. Daniel Cohen was named chancellor. Cohen concentrated on improving facilities, grounds, and programming. In 1994, the university purchased the former Playland Park, a 26.5-acre parcel on the south side of the St. Joseph River. Playland had been an amusement park, a golf course, and a ballpark. Cohen resigned in 1995 as a result of sexual harassment allegations against him, and long-time history professor, Lester C. Lamon, assumed the position of acting chancellor for two years until Kenneth L. Perrin was named chancellor.

During Perrin's tenure, two major projects were completed. Wiekamp Hall opened in 1998. The building provided much needed classroom, computer lab, and office space. The $15.7 million Student Activities Center (SAC) was constructed and completed in early 2002.

Perrin retired in 2002 and Una Mae Reck was named chancellor. Reck was formerly the vice president for academic affairs at the State University of New York at Fredonia. During Reck's administration a number of major projects were completed – student housing, a bridge connecting the campus to student housing across the St. Joseph River, the Elkhart Center, remodeling of the administration building, and the $22 million renovation of the Education and Arts Building. Upon Reck's retirement in Spring 2014, Terry L. Allison became the fifth chancellor of IU South Bend. Previously, Allison served as provost and vice president at Governor's State University in Illinois where he was also a professor of English.

== Campus ==
IU South Bend is on a pedestrian mall on the St. Joseph River. When the campus opened in the 1960s, it featured two buildings: Northside Hall and Greenlawn Hall, a former tool and die factory. Growing over 50 years, the campus now consists of 11 buildings, including River Crossing student housing, the Franklin D. Schurz Library, the Education and Arts Building, and the 100,000 sq ft (9,300 m^{2}) Student Activities Center (SAC). The university also owns 26 acres (110,000 m^{2}) on the south bank of the St. Joseph River where student housing is located.

The Student Activities Center is the site for athletics, student orientation, intramural sports, fitness classes, exercising, meetings, and recognition ceremonies.

A pedestrian bridge that bears the words "Indiana University South Bend" connects the main campus with the residential halls across the river. Construction of the bridge began in December 2005 and was completed in September 2006. On September 22, 2006, the Indiana University Board of Trustees voted to approve student housing for IU South Bend, to be located across the river. The housing facilities opened in the fall of 2008, consisting of 400 beds in eight apartment-style units, along with a community building.

In August 2007 construction was completed on the 25,000-square-foot (2,300 m^{2}) Indiana University South Bend Elkhart Center in downtown Elkhart, Indiana.

== Buildings ==
Note: List of buildings at IU South Bend is in chronological order.

Northside Hall opened in 1961. Northside includes many classrooms, laboratories, and offices. An underground walking tunnel connects the building to the Franklin D Schultz Library. Northside also houses the school's auditorium stage.

Administration Building was originally a part of the original Associates Investment Corporation complex (see also "Associates Building" below). The Administration Building was purchased in 1975.

Greenlawn Hall was the home of the former Hutchins Tool and Die Company. Greenlawn was purchased in 1966 and was opened to provide more classroom space. It was condemned in 2013, and it was torn down in April 2015.

Riverside Hall was IU South Bend's fourth building and was completed in 1969 to house the Dental Education program.

Associates Building was purchased from the Associates Investment Corporation in 1975 with an agreement the Associates Corporation would be able to have access to the buildings on a "temporary, rolling basis." (see also "Administration Building" above) IU South Bend moved into the building in 1977 and added to it in 1986. After a $22 million renovation, it is now known as the Education and Arts Building.

Child Development Center: In its early days, the Child Development Center was known as the Day Care Center. It has had three locations: in 1970 at 114 Ironwood Avenue; in 1982 it moved to 1101 East Jefferson Avenue; and in 1986 it came to the IU South Bend campuses and was then renamed the Child Development Center.

Fine Arts Building was originally the Stanz Cheeze Processing Plant. The building was purchased in the 1980s and was built circa 1950s.

Franklin D. Schurz Library was built in 1989 (ground broken in 1987). Franklin D. Schurz, chairman of the board of Schurz Communications, Inc., a media broadcasting company as well as former editor and publisher of The South Bend Tribune, gave IU South Bend generous donations to complete the construction of the building. Other monies were provided by rental income from the Associates Building's computer facility and the Indiana state bonding authority. In addition, then library director, James Mullins made significant efforts towards the building of the new library (note: this marked the library as having its own building for the first time- having moved out of Northside Hall). Architects were Edward Larrabee Barnes and John M.Y. Lee Architects.

Purdue Technology Building: The Purdue Technology Building dedication was held October 28, 1993. Purdue School of Technology courses have been offered continuously since the 1933, with two year diplomas being awarded for the first time locally in 1986. IU South Bend acquired and renovated the former Army Reserve Center adjacent to the campus on Northside Boulevard, with new classrooms and technology laboratories for Purdue University programs. The Purdue Polytechnic Institute program began to move off the IU South Bend campus in late 2019. In March 2021, the building was renamed Parkside Hall. It currently houses the Dywer Healthcare Simulation Center.

Wiekamp Hall: April 14, 1994 was the groundbreaking for the Dorothy and Darwin Wiekamp Hall housed classrooms and offices; the first purpose-built classroom facility added to the campus in more than thirty years. Dedicated in 1998, it is – with Northside Hall – the largest building for classrooms on campus. (note: Wiekamp is the site of the former Coca-Cola Bottling Factory, which was torn down to build Wiekamp Hall)

Parking Garage was built on the north end of campus in fall 1994. IU South Bend opened the parking garage. After extended negotiation, IU South Bend purchased the Coca-Cola Bottling Factory on the north end of campus and cleared the space for the construction of Wiekamp Hall as well as its adjacent parking garage. The funding for the parking garage was secured through faculty, staff, and student parking fees. The parking facility opened in fall 1994.

Student Activities Center groundbreaking was September 25, 1999. Dedicated in 2004, it serves as the primary center for student offices and activities, including the Student Government Center, the student newspaper, meeting rooms, a cafe, a workout facility, basketball, and racquetball courts.

IU School of Medicine-South Bend was dedicated in October 2005. Housed directly across from the University of Notre Dame campus (not on the IU South Bend campus), this facility offers Indiana University medical students the opportunity to take courses in their field in South Bend. The IU School of Medicine began offering classes in South Bend in 1968.

IU South Bend Elkhart Center was completed in 2007, providing a permanent base and presence in Elkhart, Indiana. It is a 25,000 square feet building located in downtown Elkhart. The IU South Bend Elkhart Center offers credit classes year-round; the Elkhart Center had previously been housed in rented space.

River Crossing Campus Apartments were dedicated in August 2008. This marked the first time that IU South Bend students had standalone on-campus housing. the land is directly across the St. Joseph River from the campus, connected by a pedestrian bridge. The land, the former Playland Park (23 acres) had been purchased in 1994.

Education and Arts Building: The Associates Building underwent a $22 million facelift beginning in June 2011. The 125,000-square-foot building was built in 1958 and purchased from the Associates Corporation in 1975. The Education and Arts Building houses the School of Education, the Ernestine M. Raclin School of the Arts (Fine Arts), and the Dental Hygiene program of the College of Health Sciences. The building also houses classrooms, offices, a 130-seat lecture room, rehearsal and art studios, and the dental clinic.

== Academics ==
- Ernestine M. Raclin School of the Arts Communication Studies, Fine Arts, Integrated New Media Studies, Music, Theater and Dance
- Judd Leighton School of Business and Economics Accounting, Advertising, Banking, Economics, Finance, General Business, Health Care Management, Human Resource Management, International Business, Management Information Systems, Marketing, and Small Business Entrepreneurship
- School of Education Counseling and Human Services, Elementary Education, Secondary Education, Professional Educational Services (Special Education and Educational Leadership)
- Vera Z. Dwyer College of Health Sciences Dental Education, Nursing, Radiography and Medical Imaging
- College of Liberal Arts and Sciences Actuarial Science, African American Studies, American Studies, Anthropology, Applied Mathematics, Art History, Astronomy, Biochemistry, Biological Sciences, Chemistry, Cognitive Science, Computer Science, Criminal Justice, Earth and Space Science, East Asian Studies, English, Environmental Studies, European Studies, Film Studies, French, General Studies, Geology, German, Gerontology, History, Informatics, International Studies, Latin American Studies, Mathematical Science, Paralegal Studies, Philosophy, Physics, Political Science, Psychology, Religious Studies, Sociology, Spanish, Sustainability Studies, Women's and Gender Studies, World Language Studies
- School of Social Work
- Labor Studies Program
- Division of Extended Learning Services IU South Bend Elkhart Center and Professional Development and Lifelong Learning

Indiana University South Bend also has a branch of the Purdue University College of Technology.

== Library ==
The Franklin D. Schurz Library collection includes nearly 600,000 print books, bound journals, and government publications; over 350,000 e-books, more than 7,700 audio/video recordings; the campus archives; and special collections such as the James Lewis Casaday Theatre Collection and the Christianson Lincoln Collection. The library subscribes to over 300 databases which provide access to full-text articles and e-books. Nearly all of these electronic resources are accessible from student labs, apartments, offices, and home via the library website. The Schurz Library is part of the IU Libraries system, which is one of the largest university library systems in the country. Students and faculty can request materials from any of the eight IU Libraries.

The Hammes Information Commons on the first floor houses a computer laboratory, as well as equipment for those with disabilities.

The library also includes The Wiekamp Educational Resource Commons, located centrally in the Education & Arts Building. It is a curriculum based library designed to support the Indiana University South Bend School of Education by providing core collection educational materials for pre-service and practicing preschool through 12th grade teachers.

== Student body ==
IU South Bend's enrollment in the fall semester of 2013 was 7,512 undergraduate students and 561 graduate students with a total of 8,073, of whom 69.1 percent were full-time. Females account for 62 percent of the student population while males account for 38 percent. Minorities make up 16 percent of the student population and international students 2 percent. About $61 million in financial aid was distributed to 49 percent of students or 9,423 students in 2012–13. IU South Bend students have an average age of 25 with 32% of the undergraduate student body age 25 or older; 81% are Indiana residents.

== Student life ==
The Office of Student Life oversees all student-administered interests. There are a variety of on- and off-campus activities sponsored by the university. More than 100 clubs and student organizations exist, including the Student Government Association, Titan Productions, political and spiritual groups.

The Student Government Association (SGA) consists of 12 senators, a president, a vice president, a secretary, and a treasurer. SGA allocates student activity funds and serves as a student voice for the administration. The Student Government Judicial Council interprets and provides guidance on the SGA Constitution and Policies, consisting of a chief justice and four associate justices.

Titan Productions is a student organization funded through the Student Activity Fee (SAF) whose purpose is to plan and present non-academic entertainment and programs primarily for the student body of IU South Bend. The organization hosts movie nights and special entertainment on campus.

IU South Bend is home to several active Greek organizations: Alpha Sigma Phi, Alpha Sigma Tau and Theta Phi Alpha.

IU South Bend has a weekly student publication called The Preface. The university also publishes the annual Undergraduate Research Journal, New Views on Gender, and an award-winning literary magazine, Analecta.

The Office of Student Services provides on-campus career placement center, child development center, and learning and writing centers, which offer free, on-site tutoring.

== Housing ==
Fall 2008 marked the first semester of which the university offered student housing. The River Crossing Apartments are located along the St. Joseph River. They are a short walk across the pedestrian bridge from campus classes, the Franklin D. Schurz Library, and Northside Hall. The housing complex includes walking trails, bicycle paths, and recreational fields. As of 2013–2014, 5.5 percent of the student body lived in college-owned housing.

The housing community center features wireless internet, computer kiosks, a big screen TV, study areas, and laundry facilities. The property is monitored 24 hours a day, seven days a week by IU South Bend Police Department; as well, resident assistants live on-site. A supermarket, pharmacy, and several restaurants are within walking distance. Shopping, museums, and theatres are available by public transportation.

== Athletics ==
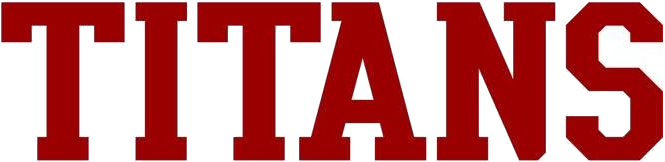
IUSB athletics wordmark

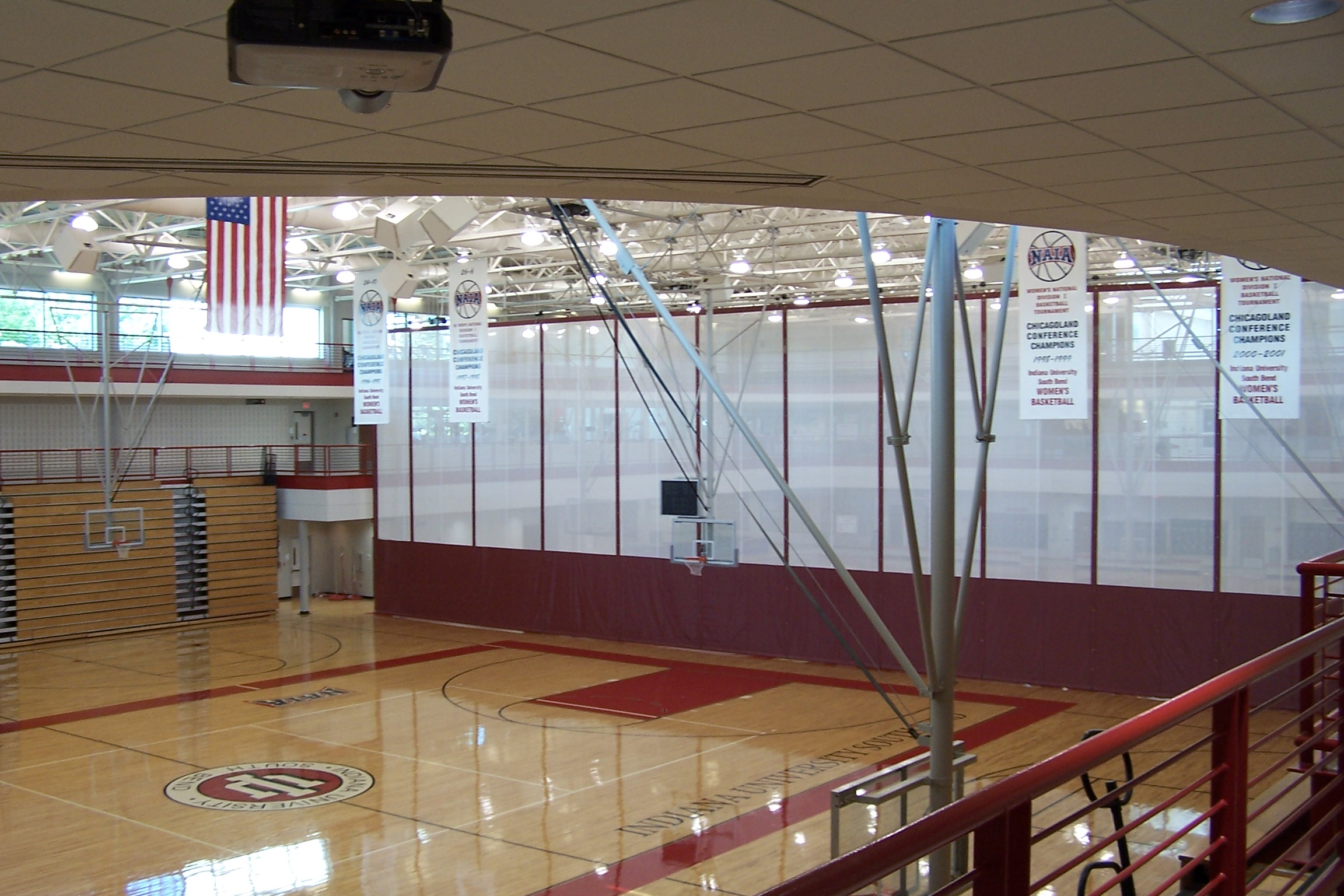
Basketball court

The Indiana–South Bend (IU South Bend or IUSB) athletic teams are called the Titans. The university competes as a member of the National Association of Intercollegiate Athletics (NAIA), primarily competing in the Chicagoland Collegiate Athletic Conference (CCAC) since the 2003–04 academic year. The Titans previously competed as an NAIA Independent from 1987–88 to 2002–03.

IU South Bend (IUSB) competes in eight intercollegiate varsity sports: Men's sports include baseball, basketball and golf; while women's sports include basketball, golf, soccer, softball and volleyball.

IU South Bend was recognized as an NAIA Champions of Character institution in 2008–09, 2009–10, 2011–12, and 2012–13.

== Faculty ==
IU South Bend reported in fall 2013 that it employed 305 full-time faculty, lecturers, and academic administrators. The campus also had 309 part-time faculty. Of the full-time faculty, 43.75 were tenured.

=== Notable faculty ===
Notable faculty of IU South Bend include Alexander Toradze, the celebrated concert pianist, master teacher and founder of the multi-national Toradze Piano Studio at IUSB. The Toradze studio has received high praise for their contributions to the piano world, and has developed into a worldwide touring ensemble that has gathered critical acclaim on an international level. Lester Lamon is a nationally known civil rights historian and author. Harold Zisla (1925–2016) was a regionally important art educator and abstract expressionist painter. Tuck Langland, who recently retired, is a well known sculptor in the United States. Several of his pieces are strewn throughout the campus. Frances Sherwood, a notable writer, is author of the novel Vindication.

In addition, recent examples of IU South Bend faculty scholarship receiving international recognition include Fred Naffziger's extensive commentary on the BBC, NBC, NPR, Wall Street Journal, NY Times, and USA Today regarding the Catholic Church's bankruptcy crises and Ilan Levine's cutting-edge research on astroparticle physics. Rolf Schimmrigk and Monika Lynker are associated with the discovery of mirror symmetry in string theory. Biologist Andrew Schnabel's work with pollen in an East African community is supported by a National Science Foundation grant. Geologist Henry Scott leads a team of scientists responsible for discoveries about the formation of methane gas. Archaeological anthropologist and social informatics professor Joshua J. Wells helps lead the Digital Index of North American Archaeology project with assistance from multiple National Science Foundation awards as well as from the federal Institute for Museum and Library Services.

== Notable alumni ==
- Melissa S. May, Judge on the Indiana Court of Appeals
- David Scholl, former President/CEO of Diagnostic Hybrids), former Chairman of the Board of Trustees at Ohio University
- Jake Teshka, member of the Indiana House of Representatives
- Rudy Yakym, member of the U.S. House of Representatives
- Shelli Yoder, Miss Indiana 1992, member of the Indiana Senate
