= Gustave Bémont =

French chemist (1857–1932)

Gustave Bémont (1 April 1857 – 28 October 1932 in Paris) was a French chemist, best remembered for his work in radioactivity and the discovery of elements radium and polonium with Pierre and Marie Curie. He was head of chemistry at ESPCI Paris.

== Biography ==
At the end of the 19th century, he worked with Pierre and Marie Curie at the Municipal School of Industrial Physics and Chemistry in Paris as head of chemistry research on radioactivity and participated in the discovery of the radioactive elements radium and Polonium.

On December 26, 1898, they published an article together in the Proceedings of the French Academy of Sciences, entitled: On a new, highly radioactive substance contained in pitchblende.

Upon his death in 1932, Paul Langevin, Justin Dupont, and Hippolyte Copaux gave speeches in tribute to Gustave Bémont.

His character appears in Claude Pinoteau 1997 film Les Palmes de monsieur Schutz, as well as in the play of the same name, directed by Jean-Noël Fenwick in 1989.

== Publications ==
- Pierre Curie; Marie Curie; Gustave Bémont (1898). Becquerel, Henri (ed.). "Sur une nouvelle substance, fortement radioactive, contenue dans la pechblende" [On a new substance, highly radioactive, contained in pitchblende] (PDF) (in French). Paris: French Academy of Sciences.
