= Nate Schenker =

American football player (1918–2009)

No. 38
- Position: Tackle

Personal information
- Born: January 27, 1918; Cleveland, Ohio, U.S.
- Died: February 10, 2009 (aged 91); Ohio, U.S.
- Listed height: 6 ft 2 in (1.88 m)
- Listed weight: 220 lb (100 kg)

Career information
- High school: East Technical (Cleveland)
- College: Howard (AL)
- NFL draft: 1939: undrafted

Career history
- Columbus Bullies (1939); Cleveland Rams (1939–1940); St. Louis Gunners (1940)

Career NFL statistics
- Games played: 4
- Stats at Pro Football Reference

Nathan Schenker (January 27, 1918 – February 10, 2009) was an American professional football player who was a tackle one season in the National Football League (NFL) for the Cleveland Rams. He played college football for the Howard Bulldogs and went undrafted in 1939.

== Early life ==
Schenker was born on January 27, 1918, in Cleveland, Ohio. He attended East Technical High School there, before attending Howard College in Homewood, Alabama. Though he did not see action as a freshman, he played on the varsity team in 1936. At the school he was a "60 minute man", playing on both sides of the ball during the entire game. He was regarded as a potential Little All-America selection as a senior but was handicapped by a broken hand. He graduated from Howard in 1939 with a degree in teaching.

== Professional career ==
After going unselected in the 1939 NFL draft, Schenker signed a minor league contract with the Columbus Bullies in the American Football League (AFL), appearing in four games. He gained attention from the professional Cleveland Rams, and shortly afterwards signed a contract with them. Wearing number 38, Schenker appeared in four games during the 1939 NFL season at the tackle position. He was re-signed for the 1940 season, but did not play with the Rams. Instead, he played briefly with the St. Louis Gunners, an independent team.

After briefly playing 1940 with St. Louis, Schenker became a high school teacher and football coach in Alabama. He was drafted to serve in World War II in 1941, and played multiple sports for the Camp Wheeler military teams, leading the Company D Fourth Training Battalion to the camp's softball championship. He later served overseas in Europe as a sergeant.

He later worked as an office manager for Mar-Kay Cartage and Major Tire. He also was an assistant football coach for Chagrin Falls High School and Solon High School, and was a bowler.

== Death ==
Schenker died on February 10, 2009, at the age of 91.
