= Winona Hazel Welch =

American bryologist

- Emeritus Professor Welch
- Born: May 5, 1896; Goodland, Indiana
- Died: January 16, 1990 (aged 93)
- Other name: W.H.Welch (botanical cite)
- Education: DePauw University
- Occupations: bryologist, professor
- Parents: Charles A. Welch (father); Carrie Johnson Welch (mother)

Winona Hazel Welch (May 5, 1896 – January 16, 1990) was an American bryologist. As a professor at DePauw University in Greencastle, Indiana, she became the first female head of the botany and bacteriology department.

== Early life ==
Welch was born on May 5, 1896, in Goodland, Indiana, to parents Charles A. and Carrie Johnson Welch. Prior to her birth, her grandfather immigrated to America from England and bought land in Indiana prior to the American Civil War. After his death, some of his mementos were donated to the Indiana State Museum. Welch was educated in a one-room school and her family discouraged thoughts of pursuing higher learning due to her gender. However, she earned money through teaching at public schools during World War I and was able to afford tuition at DePauw University for four years.

== Education and career ==
Upon her arrival at DePauw (DPU), Welch attempted to pursue chemistry but was rejected by William Blanchard based on her gender. As a result, she turned to study botany under the guidance of department head Truman G. Yuncker. Yuncker encouraged her to pursue graduate school after her undergraduate degree, and she subsequently earned her Master's degree at the University of Illinois Urbana-Champaign studying plant taxonomy and ecology with W. B. McDougall and William Trelease. By 1928, she earned a PhD from Indiana University Bloomington, where she stayed as an instructor until being offered a position at DPU as an assistant professor of botany. Welch was eventually promoted to chairman of the botany department and earned a grant from the American Philosophical Society to study in Europe for a year. By 1940, she was elected secretary of the Indiana Academy of Science and promoted to Full professor.

As a result of her scientific success, Welch became the first female president of the Indiana Academy of Science in 1947. Upon Yuncker's retirement in 1956, Welch was selected as the new department head of Botany and Bacteriology. During her time as head, Welch published a comprehensive manual of moss in Indiana, titled "Mosses of Indiana." This manual was the result of a research project she had done relating to bryophytes; it was an accompaniment to Charles Deam's "Flora of Indiana." She retired in 1961 as Professor Emeritus and then served as curator of the Truman G. Yuncker Herbarium. In 1964, she became the inaugural winner of the Outstanding Woman Teacher award at DPU.

The standard author abbreviation W.H.Welch is used to indicate this person as the author when citing a botanical name.

In 1987, a new moss species was named in her honor, Fontinalis welchiana. She died on January 16, 1990.

== See also ==
- Cagles Mill Lake — the location of the Winona Welch Botanical Area
