= Frank Curry Mathers =

American physical chemist

Frank Curry Mathers (February 11, 1881 – 1973) was an American physical chemist and university professor. He was president of the Electrochemical Society. He was a professor at Indiana University Bloomington.

== Early life and education ==
Mathers, son of Elizabeth Bonsall and John Thomas Mathers, was born in a one-room log cabin in Monroe County, Indiana, four miles south of Bloomington. He graduated from Bloomington High School in 1899. Mathers received the A.B. degree in chemistry from Indiana University Bloomington in 1903. He joined the I.U. faculty as instructor of chemistry, while also doing graduate work in electroplating with Oliver W. Brown for the M.A. degree in 1905. Mathers was granted a leave of absence from 1905 to 190 to work toward his 1907 Ph.D. at Cornell University in Ithaca, New York. His doctoral research was directed by Louis Munroe Dennis. He also studied with Wilder Dwight Bancroft at Cornell.

== Career and research ==
Mathers returned to Indiana University in 1907 as an assistant professor of inorganic chemistry. He was promoted to associate professor with tenure in 1913 and to professor in 1923. In 1946–1947, he served as the interim head of the chemistry department. He retired as emeritus professor of chemistry in 1950. Among Mathers' first graduate students was Albert Fredrick Ottomar Germann.

Mathers devoted his life to university teaching and electrochemical research. His first research was on electroplating lead from perchlorate solutions. This work was published in Transactions of the American Electrochemical Society in 1910. He continued working on electrodeposition of metals from perchloric solutions. During the first World War, he was asked to come to Washington to prepare fluorine by Wilder Dwight Bancroft, then a Major in the Chemical Warfare Service. Mathers designed an electrochemical cell, which was named after him. It produced fluorine by electrolysis of potassium hydrogen fluoride. A modification of his process was used to make fluorine for the preparation of uranium fluoride for the nuclear reactor.

Most of his research, carried out independently and with his students, was on electroplating. He developed a process for the plating of tin and found that aluminum could be plated successfully from a bath of aluminum halides and aromatic hydrocarbons. He authored more than 130 papers in Transactions of the American Electrochemical Society. In addition to his academic work, he spent many summers working in industry.

Mathers attended his first Electrochemical Society meeting at St. Louis in the fall of 1904 and joined the society that year. He was president of the Electrochemical Society. He was also a member of Alpha Chi Sigma, Phi Lambda Upsilon, and Sigma Xi.

== Personal life ==
Mathers met his wife, Maude, in class at Indiana University. They married in 1911. They had two sons, Thomas Nesbit Mathers and William Hammond Mathers. William became ill with skin cancer in his final year at Indiana University, dying in September 1938. It is after William that the Mathers Museum of World Cultures at Indiana University is named.
