= Robert P. Kingsbury =

American politician (1926–2013)

Member of the New Hampshire Legislature from the Belknap County district
- In office 2010–2012

Personal details
- Born: Robert Philip Kingsbury; May 5, 1926 Decatur, Illinois, US
- Died: September 7, 2013 (aged 87) Manchester, New Hampshire, US
- Resting place: New Hampshire State Veterans Cemetery, Boscawen, New Hampshire, US
- Education: University of Maryland, B.S. 1950

Robert Philip Kingsbury (May 5, 1926 – September 7, 2013) was an American politician and United States Army veteran. He served one term in the New Hampshire House of Representatives. He was a veteran of World War II, the Korean War, and the Vietnam War.

== Early life ==
Robert Philip Kingsbury was born on May 5, 1926, in Decatur, Illinois. His parents were Irene Rose (née Garon) and Paul C. Kingsbury. He attended East Technical High School in Cleveland, Ohio, graduating in 1944.

He attended the University of Maryland, graduating with a B.S. in animal husbandry in 1950. While there, he was a member of Alpha Phi Omega.

== Career ==
Kingsbury served in the United States Army from 1944 to 1946 and 1951 to 1953, fighting in World War II and the Korean War. During World War II, he was a rifleman in the 94th Infantry Division under General George S. Patton for fourteen months in Europe. He received a Purple Heart, Combat Infantryman Badge, Bronze Star Medal, and the Presidents 100 for markmanship. In 1952, he completed Officers Candidate School in at Fort Benning and became a second lieutenant, assigned to the 200th Infantry of the 31st (Dixie) Division at Fort Jackson, South Carolina.

He served in the United States Army Reserve from 1953 to 1979, retiring as a lieutenant colonel. In 1958, he won a rifle match held by the San Bernardino, California Area Air Force Command. In 1959, he completed the Infantry School extension program at Fort Benning and was promoted to first lieutenant. He fought in the Vietnam War. His military memoir, First Scout for General Patton, was published by Camp Constitution Press.

In civilian life, Kingsbury was an investigator for the Maryland Department of Health in Baltimore, Maryland. Later, he was a marketing supervisor for BF Goodrich and the Ethyl Corporation. Later, he sold a product to treat oil industry wastewater for the American Colloid Co. He also designed and built speedboats, receiving several patents for speedboat hulls. After he retired, he worked part-time at Walmart.

Kingsbury ran unsuccessfully for the New Hampshire House of Representatives as a Libertarian in 1994, 1996, 1998, 2000, 2002, 2004, 2006, and 2008. He also ran for the United States Congress as a Libertarian, for the mayor of Laconia as a Republican, and for the Laconia City Council. In total, he unsuccessfully ran for office sixteen times in eighteen years.

Kingsbury then ran for the New Hampshire House of Representatives as a Republican in 2010 and was elected. He served as the representative of Belknap County from 2010 to 2012. He was a member of the State and Federal Relations Committee and Veterans Affairs Committee. Kingsbury unsuccessfully ran for re-election in 2012.

== Personal life ==
Kingsbury moved to Laconia, New Hampshire in 1975. He had four daughters.

He was a member of the American Legion, the John Birch Society, and the Veterans of Foreign Wars. He was a director of the Coalition of New Hampshire Taxpayers. He was a member of The Church of Jesus Christ of Latter-day Saints in Laconia.

Kingsbury died at the Maple Leaf Health Care Center in Manchester, New Hampshire, on September 7, 2013, at the age of 87. He was buried with military honors at the New Hampshire State Veterans Cemetery in Boscawen, New Hampshire.
