= Philippe A. Guye =

Swiss chemist (1862–1922)

- Born: 12 June 1862
- Died: 27 March 1922 (aged 59)
- Occupation: Chemist
- Awards: Davy Medal (1921)

Philippe A. Guye (12 June 1862 – 27 March 1922) was a Swiss chemist who was awarded the Davy Medal in 1921 "for his researches in physical chemistry".

His younger brother, Philippe-Auguste Guye (1866 – 1942) was an experimental physicist.

Guye earned his Ph.D. at the University of Geneva, with research under the direction of Carl Gräbe. In 1892, Guye was elected to the “Chaire extraordinaire de chimie théorique et technique."

Amongst his students in Geneva were Albert Fredrick Ottomar Germann, Frank Erhart Emmanuel Germann, and Vera Estaf'evna Bogdanovskaia, who learnt about his work on stereochemistry.

In 1903, Guye founded the first Swiss journal of chemistry, the Journal de Chimie Physique. Italian photochemist Giacomo Luigi Ciamician (1857–1922), “the founder of green chemistry,” nominated Guye five times (1917, 1918, 1919, 1920, and 1921) for the Nobel Prize in Chemistry.
