= Susan Elrod =

American university chancellor, professor, scholar,

6th Chancellor of Indiana University South Bend
- In office July 1, 2019 – December 31, 2024
- Preceded by: Terry L. Allison
- Succeeded by: Andy Williams (interim); Brian Pappas

Personal details
- Born: June 13, 1963 (age 63) San Jose, California
- Occupation: Chancellor, Professor
- Scientific career
- Education: California State University, Chico (BS); University of California, Davis (PhD)
- Fields: Genetics
- Workplaces: California Polytechnic State University, San Luis Obispo; California State University, Fresno; California State University, Chico; University of Wisconsin–Whitewater; Indiana University South Bend
- Thesis: Genetic Analysis of CDC36 in Saccharomyces cerevisia (1995)
- Doctoral advisor: Elizabeth O. Shuster

Susan Lynn Elrod (born June 13, 1963) is an American professor, scholar, university administrator and the sixth chancellor of Indiana University South Bend.

== Early life and education ==
Elrod was born on June 13, 1963, in San Jose, California. She graduated from Capistrano Valley High School in Mission Viejo, CA, in 1981. Elrod completed her bachelor of science in biological science with a minor in Chemistry from California State University, Chico, in 1986. Later, in 1995, Elrod received her PhD in genetics from the University of California, Davis.

== Career ==
Elrod began her career as a research assistant at Biogen IDEC (now Biogen) in 1987, where she researched on anti-cancer antibodies. Elrod was then associated with UC Davis Medical Center in 1988 as a cancer research associate. She served as a postdoctoral researcher at Novozymes in Davis, CA, in 1995 following the completion of her PhD.

She served as an assistant professor of biological sciences at California Polytechnic State University, San Luis Obispo, beginning in 1997. Elrod also served as an assistant director of the Center for Teaching and Learning from 2002-2003. In 2003, Elrod became an associate professor in biological sciences at the university and was appointed associate chair of the department in the same year. She became associate dean and director of the Center for Science and Mathematics Education (CESaME) in 2007.

During the 2006-7 academic year, she served as an American Council on Education (ACE) Fellow, hosted by Colorado College.

In 2010, Elrod was appointed executive director of Project Kaleidoscope at the Association of American Colleges & Universities (AAC&U) in Washington, DC. She then served as dean of the College of Science and Mathematics at California State University, Fresno in 2013. Elrod was appointed as interim provost and vice president for academic affairs at California State University, Chico, in 2014.

She became a provost and executive vice chancellor for academic affairs at the University of Wisconsin, Whitewater, in 2016. In 2019, Elrod joined Indiana University South Bend as its sixth chancellor. In August 2024, Elrod announced her retirement at the end of the year while a search would be started for her replacement. A few days after her retirement, the campus announced that Brian Pappas from the University of North Dakota would replace her an chancellor starting on July 1, 2025, and that Vice Chancellor for Administration and Finance Andy Williams will serve as interim deputy chancellor in the meantime.

Elrod was elected a Fellow of the American Association for the Advancement of Science (AAAS) in 2019 and received the Woman of the Year Award from the YWCA of North Central Indiana in 2022.

== Research areas and publications ==
Elrod has researched the fields of molecular biology, microbiology, ecology, anti-cancer antibodies, and systemic change in leadership and education. Her research and publications in these areas include Assessment of fungal diversity using terminal restriction fragment (TRF) , Building, Using and Maximizing the Impact of Concept Inventories in the Biological Sciences, and Facilitating Interdisciplinary Learning: Lessons from Project Kaleidoscope.

Elrod also worked on the leadership of higher education systemic change problems. She also co-authored three books, including Shared Leadership in Higher Education in 2021, Change Leadership Toolkit in 2023, and Schaum's Outline of Genetics, fifth edition in 2010.

== Selected publications ==
Elrod has written over 30 articles on different topics for several publications, including Academic Leader, Change: The Magazine of Higher Learning, The Review of Higher Education, CBE: Life Science Education, Methods in Molecular Biology, FEMS Microbiology Ecology, Biotechniques, and others.

=== Books ===
- Holcombe, E.; Kezar, A.; Elrod, S.L.; Ramaley, J., eds. (2021). Shared Leadership in Higher Education: A Framework and Models for Responding to a Changing World. Routledge. ISBN 9781642672251.
- Elrod, Susan; Kezar, Adrianna; de Jesus González, Ángel; Holcombe, Elizabeth (2023). Change Leadership Toolkit 2.0: A Guide for Advancing Systemic Change in Higher Education. USC Pullias Center for Higher Education.
- Elrod, S.L.; Stansfield, W. (2010). Schaum's Outline of Theory and Problems of Genetics (5th ed.). New York: McGraw-Hill. ISBN 978-0071625036.

=== Articles ===
- Elrod, S. (April 1, 2024) Five Reasons Change Initiatives Fail. Academic Leader.
- González, A., Holcombe, E., Elrod, S.L., Kezar, A., (2023) Transforming Higher Education Through an Ecosystem Model of Systemic Change Leadership. Academic Leader.
- Elrod, S.L. Kezar, A., González, A., (2023) Change Leadership Toolkit: A Guide for Advancing Systemic Change in Higher Education.
- Kezar, Adrianna; Elrod, Susan (2020-09-02). "Taken for Granted: Improving the Culture of Celebration, Appreciation, and Recognition in Higher Education". Change: The Magazine of Higher Learning. 52 (5): 29–36. doi:10.1080/00091383.2020.1807880. ISSN 0009-1383.
- Elrod, Susan; Whitehead, Lorne; Huber, Mary Taylor (2020-01-02). "The Scholarship of Mission: A New Concept for Promoting Scholarly Work Advancing Institutional Goals". Change: The Magazine of Higher Learning. 52 (1): 15–22. doi:10.1080/00091383.2020.1693815. ISSN 0009-1383.
- Elrod, Susan; Kezar, Adrianna (2017-07-04). "Increasing Student Success in STEM: Summary of A Guide to Systemic Institutional Change". Change: The Magazine of Higher Learning. 49 (4): 26–34. doi:10.1080/00091383.2017.1357097. ISSN 0009-1383.
- Elrod, S.L. and Kezar, A. (2016) Increasing Student Success in STEM: A Guide to Systemic Institutional Change. Washington, DC: AAC&U.
- Kezar, A., Gehrke, S., and Elrod, S. L, (2015) Implicit Theories of Change as a Barrier to Change on College Campuses: An Examination of STEM Reform. The Review of Higher Education. 38(4): 479-506. https://eric.ed.gov/?id=EJ1066221
- Elrod, Susan; Kezar, Adrianna (June 2014). "Developing Leadership in STEM Fields: The PKAL Summer Leadership Institute". Journal of Leadership Studies. 8 (1): 33–39. doi:10.1002/jls.21319. ISSN 1935-2611.
- Kezar, Adrianna; Elrod, Susan (2012-01-04). "Facilitating Interdisciplinary Learning: Lessons from Project Kaleidoscope". Change: The Magazine of Higher Learning. 44 (1): 16–25. doi:10.1080/00091383.2012.635999. ISSN 0009-1383.
- Garvin-Doxas, Kathy; Klymkowsky, Michael; Elrod, Susan (December 2007). "Building, Using, and Maximizing the Impact of Concept Inventories in the Biological Sciences: Report on a National Science Foundation–sponsored Conference on the Construction of Concept Inventories in the Biological Sciences". CBE: Life Sciences Education. 6 (4): 277–282. doi:10.1187/cbe.07-05-0031. ISSN 1931-7913. PMC 2104501. PMID 18056297.
- Lord, N.S.; Kaplan, C.W.; Shank, P.; Kitts, C.L.; Elrod, S.L. (December 2002). "Assessment of fungal diversity using terminal restriction fragment (TRF) pattern analysis: comparison of 18S and ITS ribosomal regions". FEMS Microbiology Ecology. 42 (3): 327–337. doi:10.1111/j.1574-6941.2002.tb01022.x.
- Elrod, S.L., Jones, A., Berka, R., Cherry, J.R. (2000) Cloning of the Aspergillus oryzae hemA gene and its use as a selectable marker. Current Genetics 38: 291-8.
- Elrod, S.L. (1995) Genetic Analysis of CDC36 in Saccharomyces cerevisiae. Doctoral Dissertation, University of California, Davis.
- Hatcher, S. L.; Teplitz, R. L.; Elrod, S. L. (September 1990). "Rapid alkaline transfer of low molecular weight DNA from NuSieve GTG agarose gels". BioTechniques. 9 (3): 260–262. ISSN 0736-6205. PMID 2223064.
- Scudder, S.A., Elrod, S.L., Gumerlock, P., Kawasaki, E.S. (1990) Detection of the Multidrug Resistance (MDR) Gene Using the Polymerase Chain Reaction (PCR): Correlation with in vitro Drug-Testing. Clinical Research. 38(1): A133.

Academic offices
Preceded by Terry L. Allison	6th Chancellor of Indiana University South Bend; 2019–2024	Succeeded by Brian Pappas
