= Cagles Mill Lake =

Reservoir in Indiana, U.S.

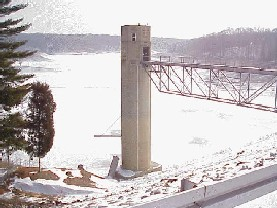
- Cagles Mill Lake as seen from dam. U.S. Army Corps of Engineers photo.

- Location within Indiana Location within the United States
- Location: Owen / Putnam counties, Indiana, United States
- Coordinates: 39°27′52″N 86°52′58″W
- Type: reservoir
- Primary inflows: Mill Creek
- Primary outflows: Mill Creek (39°30′00″N 86°56′13″W)
- Basin countries: United States
- Surface area: 1,400 acres (570 ha)
- Water volume: 228,120 acre⋅ft (0.28138 km^{3}) Peak 27,112 acre⋅ft (0.033442 km^{3}) Normal
- Surface elevation: 636 feet (194 m)
- Website: http://www.in.gov/dnr/parklake/2960.htm

Cagles Mill Lake, also known as Cataract Lake or Cagle's Mill Reservoir or Lieber Reservoir, is a reservoir located near Cataract, Indiana, in Lieber State Recreation Area, in west central Indiana on the borders of Putnam and Owen counties. It was Indiana's first flood control reservoir.

Cagles Mill Dam is a flood control project of the United States Army Corps of Engineers (USACE), an earthen dam that was dedicated on 1952-06-18 and completed in December 1953. Its purpose was to alleviate flood damage in the valleys of the Eel, the White, and the Wabash rivers.

The Lake is alimented from the north by Mill Creek and drains out through Mill Creek, once more. Mill Creek flows into Deer Creek which in turn flows into the Eel River to its south, which then makes its way to the White River.

Mill Creek is named for a grist mill, Cagle Mill, that used to operate downstream of where the Lake now is. The mill itself was destroyed and rebuilt several times over the years, finally vanishing for good in 1975. However, its low-level dam still exists.

Near to the site of the mill are the Hoosier Highlands, a recreational area created in 1924, whose name was suggested by Indiana poet William Herschel.

== Dam and emergency spillway ==
The dam (39°29′13″N 86°55′01″W) is a 150 feet (46 m) high and 900 feet (270 m) long earth and rock fill structure located roughly 2 miles (3 km) upstream of Mill Creek mouth. It impounds a maximum capacity of 390,731 acre-feet (481,960 Ml), and normal storage of 27,112 acre-feet (33,442 Ml). Its maximum flood control area is 4,840 acres (1,960 ha).

The gaging station (number 597) at Mill Creek near Manhattan (39°29′21″N 86°55′49″W) is 200 feet (61 m) downstream from the mill and 0.75 miles (1.21 km) downstream from the reservoir proper. It has a drainage area of 292 square miles (760 km^{2}) with a datum elevation of 581.83 feet (177.34 m) above mean sea level. The mean rate of discharge measured over the period 1938 to 1950 was 283 cubic feet per second (8.0 kl/s).

The emergency spillway for the lake is located on the north west of the lake (39°28′52″N 86°54′50″W) on the dam's left abutment, and is a restricted access area maintained by the USACE. It is 60 feet (18 m) deep and over 1,000 feet (300 m) long, with a crest at 704 feet (215 m) above mean sea level. Thus the lake has a maximum additional capacity of 201,000 acre-feet (248,000 Ml) for temporary flood run-off water.

At the east end of the cut made for the spillway, Pleistocene rocks are exposed. The cut is outwith the Wisconsinan glacial margin on a till plane. It has been the subject of much study over the years, the exposed stratigraphy there proving useful to geologists for evidence of glaciation.

The dam project, performed under authority of the Flood Control Act 1938, cost US$4,263,184 (equivalent to $51,301,375 in 2025), US$106,813 (equivalent to $1,285,343 in 2025) of which were non-federal funds for the construction of recreation facilities.

=== Ravines and Winona H. Welch botanical area ===
Any water flowing down the spillway flows into the St Genevieve Ravine (which runs to 39°29′10″N 86°55′12″W from 39°28′34″N 86°55′16″W), which has a small rill running down it. The ravine has woods on its westward side containing narrow-leaved spleenwort and Goldie fern. Plants found here by Winona Hazel Welch include Asplenum pinnatifidum (a fern), Fontinalis novae-angliae var. latifola (an aquatic moss), and Pellia epiphylla (a liverwort). The ravine used to be Hoosier Highlands property, but was no longer so by the end of the 1960s.

The next ravine to the west (39°29′17″N 86°55′34″W) was named the Winona Welch Botanical Area. It remained Hoosier Highlands property by the end of the 1960s, but at the time Welch explored the area both it and the St Genevieve Ravine were Hoosier Highlands property, and where her notes on the area refer to the Hoosier Highlands area they can be referring to either.

== Roads and waterfalls ==
Indiana State Road 42 once went through where Cataract Lake is now and currently has a new, entirely different route on the upper area from its original route.

Located on the lake are the state's largest waterfalls, the Cataract Falls (39°26′31″N 86°49′08″W and 39°26′02″N 86°48′47″W). A main attraction to tourists on the lake is a bald eagle's nest, where the birds return every season.
