= Hippolyte Copaux =

French chemist

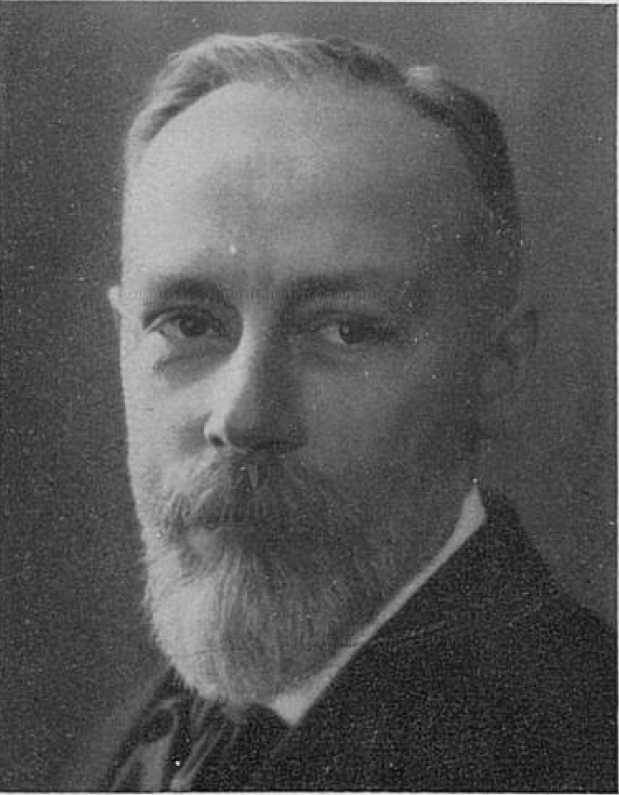

Hippolyte Eugène Copaux (9 March 1872 in Paris – 28 August 1934 in Etampes) was a French chemist, best known for his work in inorganic chemistry, crystallography, and for determining the physical properties of metallic cobalt.

Copaux was born in Paris and was raised by his mother after the early death of his father. At the school run by Marists where he was educated, he became interested in literature but went on to study chemistry at Ecole Supérieure de Physique et de Chimie Industrielles de la Ville de Paris where he joined in the analytical chemistry department as an assistant to Henri Moissan. He became a professor in 1910. He examined the crystals of cobalt and studied its salts. During World War I he headed the chemical department of the patent office. His method to produce beryllium oxide is still used for industrial production. He was made a Knight of the Legion of Honor in 1923, being promoted to officer in 1933. He served as director of studies at ESPCI from 1926 to 1934.
