= Cataract Lake (Arizona) =

Waterbody in Coconino County, Arizona

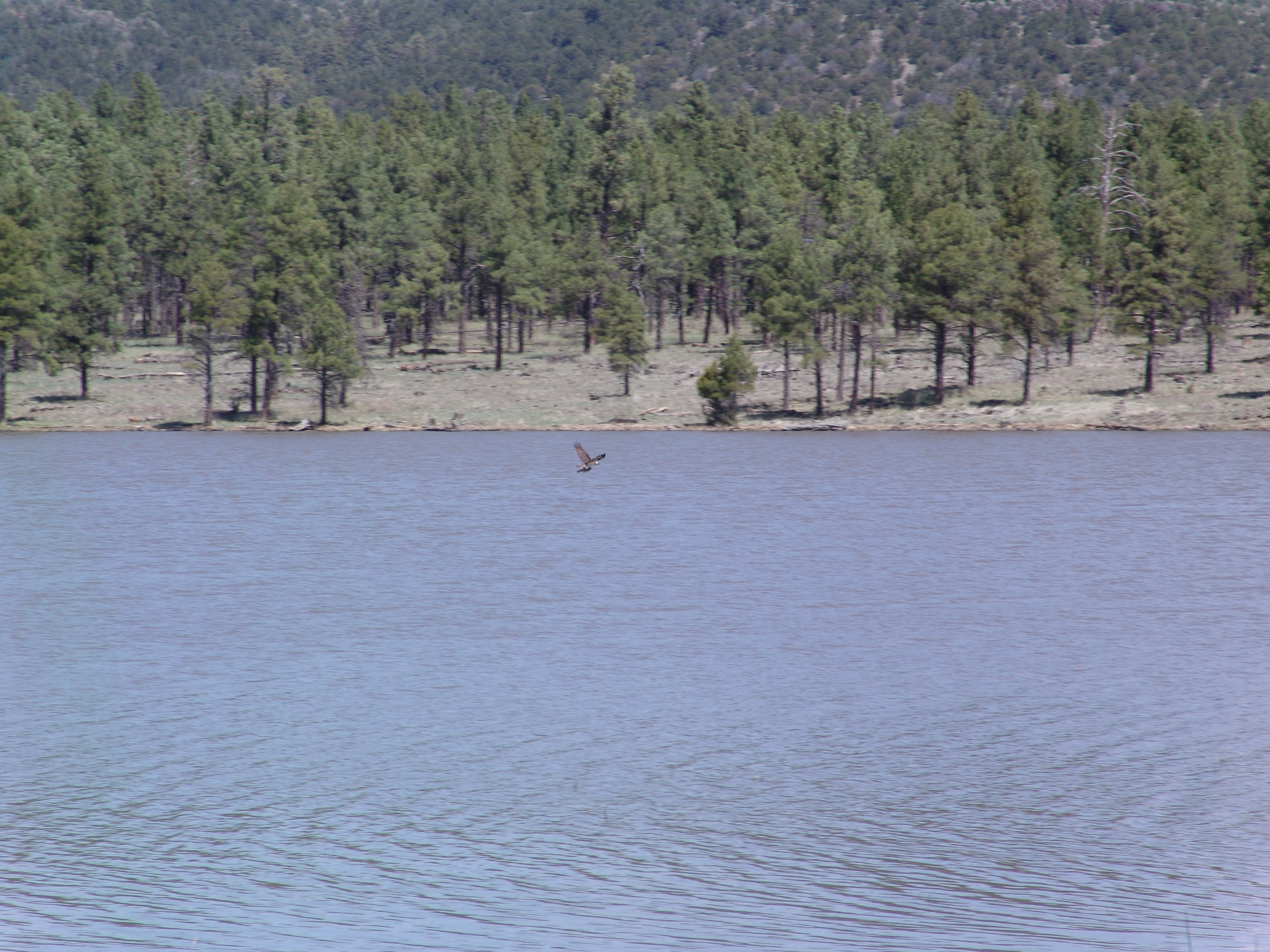
- Cataract Lake, Arizona. A bird of prey flies off with a fish.

- Location within Arizona Location within the United States
- Location: Coconino County, Arizona, United States
- Coordinates: 35°15′03.2″N 112°13′00.8″W
- Basin countries: United States
- Surface area: 35 acres (14 ha)
- Average depth: 12 ft (3.7 m)
- Surface elevation: 6,800 ft (2,100 m)

Cataract Lake is a lake in Coconino County which is located near Williams in North Central Arizona.

== Fish species ==
- Rainbow Trout
- Brown Trout
- Largemouth Bass
- Crappie
- Sunfish
- Catfish (Channel)
