= Frank Erhart Emmanuel Germann =

American physicist (1887–1974)

Frank Erhart Emmanuel Germann (December 6, 1887 – February 27, 1974) was an American physicist, physical chemist, and university professor. He was a founding member of the modern chemistry department of the University of Colorado.

== Early life and education ==
Germann was born in Peru, Miami County, Indiana, the second child of Mary Fredericke Mueller (1864–1942) and Gustave Adolph Germann (1860–1940). His only sibling was Albert Fredrick Ottomar Germann (1886–1976), who was also a physical chemist. Frank Germann graduated from Peru High School in 1906. He received the A.B. in physics from Indiana University Bloomington in 1911. He received the Sc.D. degree (docteur ès sciences physiques) from the University of Geneva (Geneva, Switzerland) in 1914 with research under the guidance of Philippe-Auguste Guye (1862–1922).

== Career and research ==
Germann was on the faculties of the University of Geneva (1912–1914). Indiana University, Bloomington (1914), Cornell University, Ithaca, New York (1914–1918), Colorado School of Mines, Golden (1918–1919), and the University of Colorado Boulder (1919–1956). He was also on the research staff of the National Bureau of Standards–Boulder (1956–1966).

At the University of Geneva, he was assistant en chimie théorique et technique. His research there resulted in many publications.

While writing his Sc.D. thesis, he was instructor of French for one semester in the Department of Romance Languages at Indiana University. At Cornell, Frank's initial appointment was as Assistant in Physics; promotion to Instructor in Physics awaited the doctorate. In his first physical chemistry research, he found evidence for the iscositetrahydrate of uranium nitrate. At Colorado School of Mines, he was associate professor, a joint appointment in the Departments of Physics and Electrical Engineering.

Germann was appointed associate professor of chemistry at the University of Colorado for the 1919–1920 academic year, promoted to professor of chemistry within a year. Germann joined John Bernard Ekeley (1869–1951) and Paul Marshall Dean (born 1885). These three men were to lead the department of chemistry for many years. Ekeley retired in 1937. Dean retired in 1953. Germann retired in 1956.

Germann's ideas (about capturing carbon dioxide from underground sources, converting the gas to a solid for economical transport, and then using the gas agriculturally to increase plant growth) received national attention.

Of Germann's many students, 23 earned graduate degrees in chemistry or chemical engineering from the University of Colorado. Four students—Ralph Newton Traxler, Malcolm Cleveland Hylan, Dzu-Kun Shen, and Thomas Howard James —investigated the chemistry and physics of photography. Two students—Derk Vivian Tieszen and Oscar Brauer Muench —investigated alkali metal platinocyanides. Before spectrophotofluorometers were commercially available, James William Hensley, Ray Alan Woodriff, Elmer Russell Alexander, and Robert George Rekers were investigating fluorescence, phosphorescence, and luminescence.

Paul Frey, a graduate student of Germann, received the National Council Citation Award from Albright College in 1980 "for his excellence as a teacher and as a writer of a long list of books in the field of chemistry." That list included An Outline of Mathematics and Problems for Students of General Chemistry, a popular addition to the Barnes and Noble College Outline series, that went through eight editions between 1938 and 1985. His most influential textbook was College Chemistry (Englewood Cliffs, New Jersey: Prentice-Hall, 1952, 1958, 1965). A popular trimmed version was Essentials of College Chemistry (Prentice-Hall, 1960).

Charles Franklin Metz, another Germann graduate student (M.S. 1928, Ph.D. 1936), was one of the twelve scientists who conducted the world's first firing of a nuclear weapon, the "Trinity" test on New Mexico's Alamogordo Bombing and Gunnery Range on Monday, July 16, 1945. On Monday, August 6, 1945, a nuclear bomb was detonated over Hiroshima, Japan. Later that week, on Thursday, August 9, 1945, a nuclear bomb was detonated over Nagasaki, Japan. Japan surrendered on Tuesday, August 14, 1945.

== Personal life ==
Germann married Martha Minna Marie Knechtel (1892–1966) on July 25, 1916, in St. John's Evangelical Lutheran Church in Peru. The Rev. Paul Stoeppelwerth officiated at the wedding of his niece-in-law. Martha and Frank had two children: Richard Paul Germann (1981–2007) and Lois Marie Germann Jones (1921–2013).

Frank was raised as a member of the Lutheran Church (Missouri Synod) and as a youngster attended the Lutheran St. John's Christian Day School in Peru. He was a member of the Lutheran Concordia Club at Indiana University, and later the Lutheran Academy for Scholarship (Academia Lutherana Philosophiæ). He contributed an article to the academy quarterly.
