= Stephen Sargent Visher =

American geographer (1887–1967)

Stephen Sargent Visher (1887 – October 25, 1967) was an American regional geographer and eugenicist. He spent most of his academic career as professor of geography at Indiana University, Department of Geology. His interests included the geography of intelligence, ecology and the historical geography of Indiana – on which he wrote prolifically (C. Lavery, 2015). After his death he was called the "Mr Geography of Indiana" as a result of the many articles and books he wrote concerning the Hoosier State (J. Rose, 1971). His interests in eugenics influenced in the work of Ellsworth Huntington, while his geographical work and stories of eastern travel were among the main reasons Pulitzer Prize winning war correspondent Ernie Pyle began traveling to the Far East (O. Johnson, 2011).

== Early life ==
Visher was born in Chicago to a second-generation Dutch immigrant (father) and a New Hampshire native (mother). Irregular school attendance did not diminish his interest in the physical environment, human settlement and animal and plant ecology (C. Harris, 1968). His early interest in these fields laid the foundations for his later research into the influence of the environment on humanity (C. Lavery, 2015). He spent most of his teenage years living between South Dakota and Chicago – where he attended the Lewis Institute to pursue a course in geology and biology. He was then awarded an undergraduate degree in botany and a master's degree in geology at the University of Chicago in 1910.

== Geographical work ==
Visher's early geographical work was heavily influenced by Ellen Churchill Semple's widely-read Influences of Geographic Environment (1911) – so much so that he introduced much of Semple's thinking into his geography course at Indiana University in 1919 (Keighren, 2010). He was particularly interested in the fields of anthropogeography and environmental determinism. He borrowed from these geographical trends to help explain, for example, the historic development of urban areas and the 'geography of notables' (S. Visher, 1928). In addition, the works of ecologist Harlan Barrows and sociologist George Vincent stirred Visher's interests in social evolution, educational attainment, civic sciences and the spatial nature of intelligence (C. Lavery, 2015).

With Ellsworth Huntington, Visher's attention focused more and more on climatological changes and the effect on life on Earth. In Climatic Changes, their Nature and Causes (1922) the authors claimed that changes in solar activity has had significant effects on Earth's climate. They also speculated that this was a chief (or at least important) driver of evolution (J. Fleming, 1998, 105). For instance, they speculated that dynamic solar activity 'may be regarded as the great terrestrial contribution to the climatic environment which guides the development of life' (Huntington and Visher 1922, 240).

As a regional geographer, Visher was concerned about spatial variation. The variability of 'social conditions' or the 'quality of the population' were explained by Visher by invoking environmental explanations (S. Visher, 1931, 757). He suggested, for instance, that the climate, land-use, soil fertility and relief of the land were all factors that needed to be taken into consideration to give a fuller explanation of social and biological differences. Combining this approach with his support of the eugenics movement, Visher set about trying to explain why some areas of the United States have a larger proportion of intelligent people (or 'notables' as he called them) than other areas. As Lavery (2015) has demonstrated, Visher used statistics from American Men of Science and Who's Who in America to claim that "the Northern and Eastern states contained disproportionately more 'notables' than any other areas of the country". On this national scale, Visher's explanation of this observation was that the climate of the Northern states is more conducive to intellectual development, while the Southern states suffered from what he called 'an enervating climate' (S. Visher, 1922, 446). On the smaller, regional scale climate played less of an intrusive role. Instead, in his view, the social, political and economic environment went some way to determine intelligence and academic achievement.

== Achievements ==
Visher was an active geographer; and, in terms of publications, one of the most productive in the United States throughout the 1930s and 1940s. His work was recognized nationally and internationally. He was awarded a postdoctoral fellowship at Yale in 1920; he was elected vice president of the American Association of Geographers in 1931 and president of the Indiana Academy of Science in 1950; and held visiting professorships at Cornell University, and the Universities of Colorado and British Columbia (C. Lavery, 2015).
