= Albert Fredrick Ottomar Germann =

American chemist (1886–1976)

- Born: February 18, 1886; Peru, Indiana
- Died: December 22, 1976 (aged 90)
- Burial place: St. John's cemetery
- Education: Indiana University Bloomington, University of Wisconsin, University of Geneva
- Spouse: Ida Helene Johanna Meinke
- Relatives: Frank Erhart Emmanuel Germann (Brother)

Albert Fredrick Ottomar Germann (February 18, 1886 – December 22, 1976) was an American physical chemist, university professor, and chemical entrepreneur.

== Early life and education ==
Germann was born in Peru, Miami County, Indiana, eldest child of Mary Fredericke Mueller (1864–1942) and Gustave Adolph Germann (1860–1940). His only sibling was Frank Erhart Emmanuel Germann (1887–1974), who also became a physical chemist. Albert Germann graduated from Peru High School in 1904. Germann taught in Miami County rural schools while working his way through a chemistry major at Indiana University Bloomington. He received the A.B. in chemistry in 1909 and the A.M. in chemistry in 1910, both from Indiana University, and the M.Sc. degree in chemistry from the University of Wisconsin in Madison, also in 1910. He received the Sc.D. degree (doctorat ès sciences physiques et chimiques) from the University of Geneva (Geneva, Switzerland) in 1914 under the guidance of Philippe-Auguste Guye (1862–1922).

== Career and research ==
Germann's first scholarly publications reported his undergraduate electrochemistry research under the direction of Frank Curry Mathers (1881–1973). His M.Sc. research at Wisconsin was with Joseph Howard Mathews (1881–1970). His Sc.D. thesis was published as Albert-F.-O. Germann, Révision de la densité de l'oxygène, contribution à la détermination de la densité l'air à Genève, thèse number 514 (Genève: Imprimerie Albert Κündig, 1913, 63 pages); Journal de Chimie physique, volume 12 (1914), pages 66–108.

Germann was on the chemistry faculties of Western Reserve University, Cleveland, Ohio (1913–1921), Stanford University, Palo Alto, California (1921–1925), and Valparaiso University, Valparaiso, Indiana (1926–1927).

At Western Reserve, he extended his doctoral research, and then began cryoscopic studies of non-aqueous systems involving boron trifluoride or phosgene. Five students conducted these experiments. Harold Simmons Booth (1891–1953) had already completed his doctoral program at Cornell University. In September 1920, Booth became a member of the Western Reserve chemistry faculty, and was to have a distinguished career as an inorganic chemist at Western Reserve. He served as department chair. He was Editor-in-Chief of the inaugural volume (in 1939) of Inorganic Syntheses, a prestigious series that continues. He was promoted to Hurlbut Professor of Chemistry in 1947. Vernon Jersey (1898–1984) had received the A.B. in chemistry from Western Reserve in 1920, and had begun graduate research with Germann on phosgene. He studied solutions of phosgene and chlorine, obtaining cryoscopic evidence for ten different compounds, including chlorine octaphosgenate. Jersey's interests evolved into biochemistry, and he earned a Ph.D. in 1935 from Western Reserve. He then joined with Germann to form Nutritional Research Associates, Inc. Wendell Phillips was beginning his senior year, and would be awarded the A.B. degree in 1921. Leland Roy Smith had received the A.B. degree in 1920, and was beginning graduate studies at Western Reserve; he received the A.M. in 1921, and received the A.M. degree from Harvard University in 1923. Marion Cleaveland (1898–1975) had received the B.A. in chemistry in 1920, and would be awarded the M.A. in 1921. She pursued doctoral studies at Columbia University from 1926 to 1928, receiving the Ph.D. Except for her time at Columbia, she taught at Western Reserve from 1921 to 1946.

At Stanford, Germann focused on phosgene as a liquid solvent. His goal was to develop a solvent-system definition of acids and bases that would apply to compounds dissolved in solvents such as phosgene.

In 1925, Germann became research director of Laboratory Products Company. Brothers William Otto Frohring (1893–1959) and Paul R. Frohring (1903–1998) "did groundbreaking laboratory work at the Laboratory Products Co. in Cleveland that produced the first ready-prepared infant formula." Recognizing that the infant-food field was becoming crowded, the Frohring brothers began to diversify research and operations. Germann was recruited to lead the company into specialty biochemicals.

Germann was granted a year leave to take an active role in Lutheranizing a faltering Valparaiso University. He became professor of chemistry at Valparaiso, head of the department of chemistry, and acting dean of the school of pharmacy. Germann was acting president of Valparaiso University from May to September, 1927. During that time, the school of pharmacy was accepted as a member of the American Association of Colleges of Pharmacy, and judged to be conforming to the Association's standards.

Back in Cleveland at Laboratory Products Company, Germann assembled his own research group. The specialty biochemical carotene was prominent in his plans. His associates were Vernon Jersey, Robert John Cross (1884–1955), Otto Ungnade (1883–1963), and Harold Barnett (1903–1956). They intended to capitalize on the vitamin revolution. Germann, Jersey, Cross, and Ungnade founded Nutritional Research Associates, Inc. in 1935 with Albert Germann President. They established research and production facilities in South Whitley, Indiana, for extraction, purification, and stabilization of Vitamin A from carrots and Vitamin E from wheat germ.

== Personal life ==
Germann married Ida Helene Johanna Meinke (1884–1976) on November 26, 1914. They had four children: Luise Barbara Germann Pook (February 11, 1916 – January 27, 2012), Edith Germann Osborn (September 6, 1917 – March 31, 1990), Lucia May Germann Harley (May 28, 1920 – January 12, 1998), and Albert Fredrick Ottomar Germann II (born January 4, 1929).

Albert Sr. was raised as a member of the Lutheran Church (Missouri Synod) and as a youngster attended the Lutheran St. John's Christian Day School in Peru. After moving to South Whitley, Ida and Albert joined St. John's Lutheran Church (Missouri Synod), six miles east of South Whitley. Both were buried in the St. John's cemetery.
