= Mill Creek, Indiana =

Unincorporated community in Indiana, U.S.

Coordinates: 41°34′50″N 86°31′54″W

Mill Creek is an unincorporated community in northern Lincoln Township, LaPorte County, Indiana, United States. It lies along CR875E, east of the city of La Porte, the county seat of LaPorte County. Although Mill Creek is unincorporated, it has a post office, with the ZIP code of 46365. It is possible to reach Mill Creek from Upper Fish Lake by way of a shallow stream that feeds the lake: this stream passes under a railroad bridge about a half mile east of the town. Mill Creek is not an actual creek, it is south of La Porte.

== History ==
A plat was recorded for Mill Creek in 1834. The Mill Creek post office opened in 1875.
