= Housing inequality in Ohio =

Housing inequalities in Ohio relate to the historic and continuing factors that prevent predominantly people of color from accessing safe and affordable housing. It is self evident that income inequality is the single biggest factor that prevents the purchase of a major asset like a house. Restrictive zoning laws, market forces, job insecurity, lack of savings, and the credit ratings of first home buyers, all play pivotal roles in the overall problem of displacement, exclusion and segregation. Ohio retains a large amount of housing specifically in highly concentrated areas such as Cleveland, Cincinnati and Columbus, which rate in the top 21 cities of racial segregation in the U.S.

== History ==
Black Ohioans has been experiencing housing inequality since the Civil War and responses towards it have greatly varied from the northern and southern parts of the state. Certain ideals challenged the state during this time coinciding with the thought that southern Ohio was a "white mans state" even though the Northwest Ordinance of 1787 under the Articles of Confederation invited the mot Ohio. During the Industrialization period whites ad blacks were pitted against each other when white workers would go on strike they companies would then replace them temporarily with black workers. This escalated tensions allowing for discrimination to not only continue but to prevail and expand exponentially, primarily with housing. During this time there were minority groups who experienced similar discrimination such as Jewish immigrants, though as they became "americanized" and economically inclined they were welcomed into the housing markets. Up until the early 1950s with the Brown v. Board of Education ruling there were very little if any laws protecting minority groups. The Federal government actually supported racial exclusion in its FHA and VA mortgage loan insurance programs for decades. FHA (Fair Housing Administration) manuals spoke of the need to avoid introduction of “inharmonious racial groups” into all-White neighborhoods.

=== 1940s and 1950s ===
Shelley. Kramer (1949) upheld the inability to enforce the covenants by the Supreme Court though continued regardless The Federal government explicitly supported racial exclusion in its FHA and VA mortgage loan insurance programs for many years. FHA manuals spoke of the need to avoid introduction of “inharmonious racial groups” into all-White neighborhoods. Thus, there was a strong economic incentive for some real estate agents to engage in |panic peddling or blockbusting in targeted, usually adjacent White neighborhoods. The Lee-Harvard area of Southeast Cleveland provided many classic examples of these practices with agents facilitating the move of a single Negro purchaser to a block, followed by blanketing the area with phone calls and leaflets offering to buy from edgy homeowners "before it’s too late" though also probably at less than the homes were really wort 1959, the Ohio General Assembly passed legislation prohibiting discrimination in employment and establishing the Ohio Civil Rights Commission. Fair housing in Ohio received a boost when a young representative, Carl B. Stokes, in 1965 pushed through Fair Housing legislation in the Ohio Legislature three years before fair housing legislation became a reality in Washington, D.C.

=== 1960s-1980s ===
Unfortunately, the state of Ohio did not have an effective fair housing law for a number of years after the Lysyj decision of 1974 (38 O.S.2d 217, 380.0.2d 287). This Ohio Supreme Court decision pulled the teeth out of the state Fair Housing Act, and it was not until Vernon Sykes (D-Akron) introduced H.B. 5, a state Fair Housing Law, with the support of a Democratic governor, Richard F. Celeste. Ohio had a Fair Housing Law in June 1987.

They developed a strong set of parallel economic and social institutions within the ghetto. Chapters of the NAACP and the Urban League were established in many Ohio cities. To this day, the Cleveland area has two real estate bodies: the Cleveland Area Board of Realtors (CABOR-now with multi-racial membership); and the Cleveland Association of Real Estate Brokers (CAREB-a mainly Black trade association).

== Causes ==
Zoning laws are extremely restrictive in limiting the total amount of housing to be constructed in any given area. Research has shown cities and suburbs with increasingly restrictive zoning laws also have a correlation with increased segregation within those same communities and one of the leading causes for racial segregation still today.

Other causes encompass overall affordability and credit ratings of the borrowers looking to buy homes for the first time. This also includes the lack of enough saved for the required down payment which infers on the instability level of the buyer(s) which play a pivotal role in the overall scheme within the housing sector.
