= Dayton Christian School System =

Dayton Christian School

Location
- 9391 Washington Church Road; Miamisburg, (Montgomery County), Ohio 45342; United States

Information
- Religious affiliation: Non-denominational Christian
- Principal: Darren Gentry (DCHS/JH); James Holliday (DCES)
- Head of school: Matt Baker
- Grades: PreK–12
- Colours: Purple and gold
- Nickname: Warriors
- Website: daytonchristian.com

Dayton Christian School System is a private, non-denominational PreK-12th grade Christian school district located in southwestern Ohio. There are two schools in the system: Dayton Christian School, located on its Dayton campus in Miamisburg, Ohio. Dayton Christian Homeschool and LightShine Academy, the preschool program of Dayton Christian School, are located on the Dayton campus. Since 1963, the Dayton Christian School System has graduated over 5,000 students. 1,200 currently attend one of their schools.

== History ==
In 1963, Claude "Bud" Schindler, an NCR Corporation executive, started a 14-student kindergarten class at Patterson Park Grace Brethren Church. Dayton Christian High School opened in 1967. Dayton Christian Middle School opened in 1979, and in 1984 Sugar Grove Elementary was added. In 1991, Brookville Elementary was added. Two years later in 1993, Xenia Christian Elementary and Xenia Christian High School were added. In 2002, the Sugar Grove Elementary and Brookville Elementary combined to form Northwest Christian School. Northwest Christian School later closed in 2008.

In 1979, the schools ended employment of Linda Hoskinson, a married elementary teacher, because she was pregnant and the school felt she should not work outside the home while her kids were young. Her sex discrimination lawsuit went to the U.S. Supreme Court in Ohio Civil Rights Commission v. Dayton Christian Schools, Inc. The schools subsequently changed their employment practices.

In 2005, the schools purchased the former NCR training center on Washington Church Road and converted the adult education space into its Miami Township campus. The state of Ohio provided a $379,516 grant to demolish the other structures on the property.
