= Legacy Christian Academy (Ohio) =

Location
- 1101 Wesley Avenue; Xenia, Ohio 45385; United States; 39°39′53″N 83°55′28″W

Information
- Type: Private, co-educational
- Religious affiliation: Interdenominational Christian
- Opened: 1967
- Status: Open
- Grades: Pre-K–12
- Campus type: Small City
- Colors: Navy Blue, Columbia Blue, and White
- Athletics conference: Metro Buckeye Conference
- Nickname: Knights
- Rival: Dayton Christian High School
- Yearbook: The Emissary
- Annual tuition: $11,410 (high school)
- Affiliation: ACSI
- Website: www.legacyknights.org

Legacy Christian Academy, formerly Xenia Christian School, is a private, non-denominational Christian school in Xenia, Ohio, United States. Legacy Christian enrolls students in grades pre-K through 12.

== Location ==
Legacy Christian Academy's campus is located on Home Avenue (US Route 68) on the southern end of the city of Xenia. The school moved to its present location in 1999. It had previously been in a building on Bellbrook Avenue in Xenia, west of the current location. The elementary was located in nearby Emmanuel Baptist Church.

The Legacy Campus is the former home of the Ohio Soldiers' and Sailors' Orphans' Home, which was later renamed "Ohio Veterans Children's Home" in 1978. The Ohio Veterans Children's home closed to incoming students in 1995 and was closed completely in 1997. Legacy now uses the school building formerly occupied by "Woodrow Wilson High School", the school that was operated by the home. Legacy Ministries International purchased the 253-acre (102 ha) campus in 1998 and Xenia Christian had its first year at legacy campus in the 1999–2000 school year. There is a museum on the campus dedicated to the Ohio Veterans Children's Home.

The campus is divided into three sections owned by the school, Athletes in Action, and National Church Residences. The campus is home to Legacy Village Retirement Community, The Schindler Banquet Center, International School Project (ISP), and Heart to Honduras.

== Athletics ==
The Legacy Christian Knights compete in the Metro Buckeye Conference. The school has long had a rivalry with Dayton Christian School's Warriors. Sports at Legacy are:

- Bowling
- Cross Country
- Soccer
- Girls' Volleyball
- Swimming
- Basketball
- Soccer
- Golf
- Baseball
- Track & Field
- Tennis
- Wrestling
- Softball

=== Sports complex ===
Athletes in Action has a sports complex on the campus that is used by LCA. The complex includes two softball fields, a baseball field, two full-sized NCAA soccer fields, an interchangeable football/soccer field, and a lighted football field.

== Notable alumni ==
- Grace Norman — paralympic triathlete
- Drew Brads — speedcuber
- Nathan Attisano

== Gallery ==
Historic photos
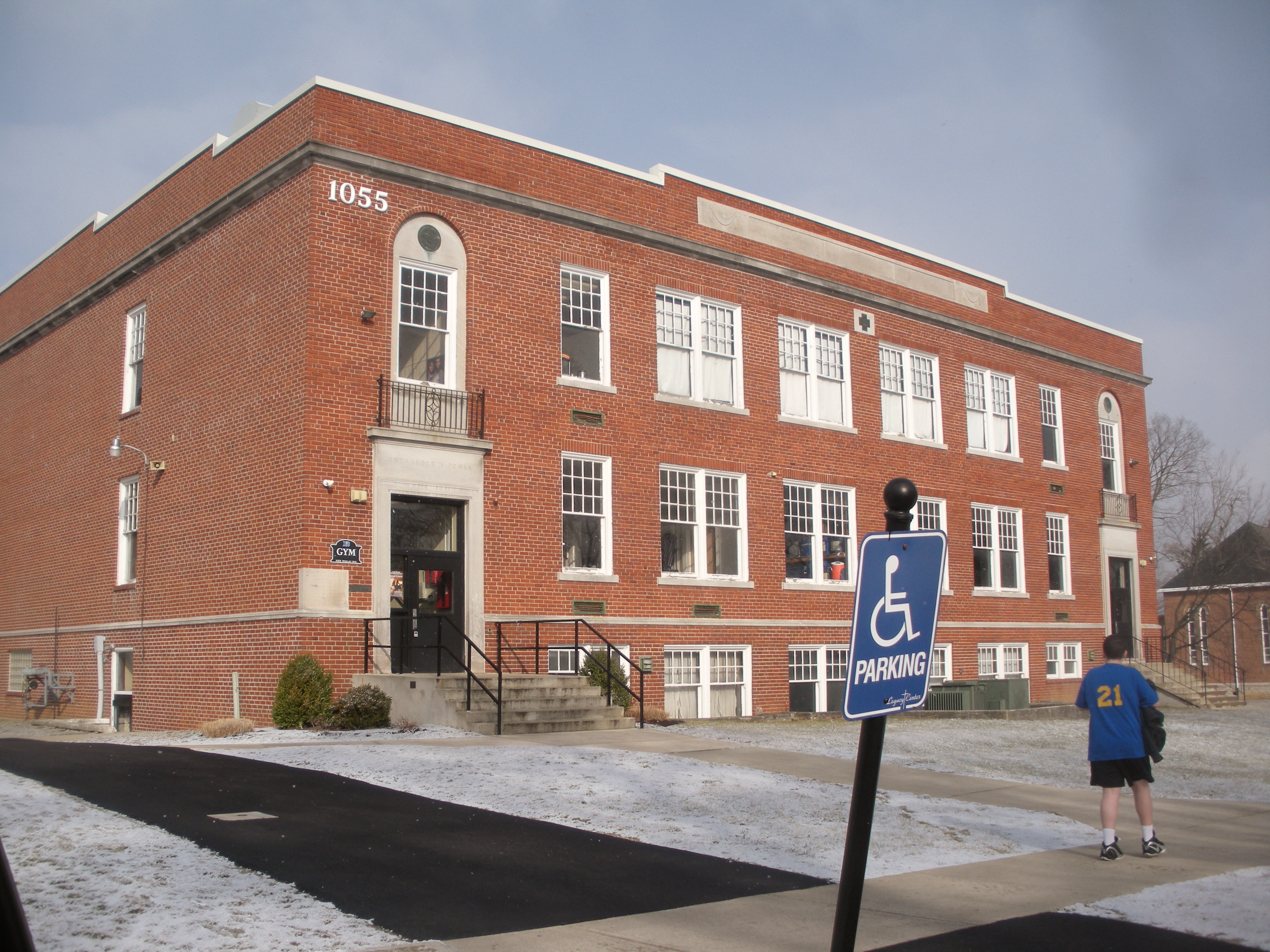
Legacy Christian Academy Gymnasium, constructed in 1924

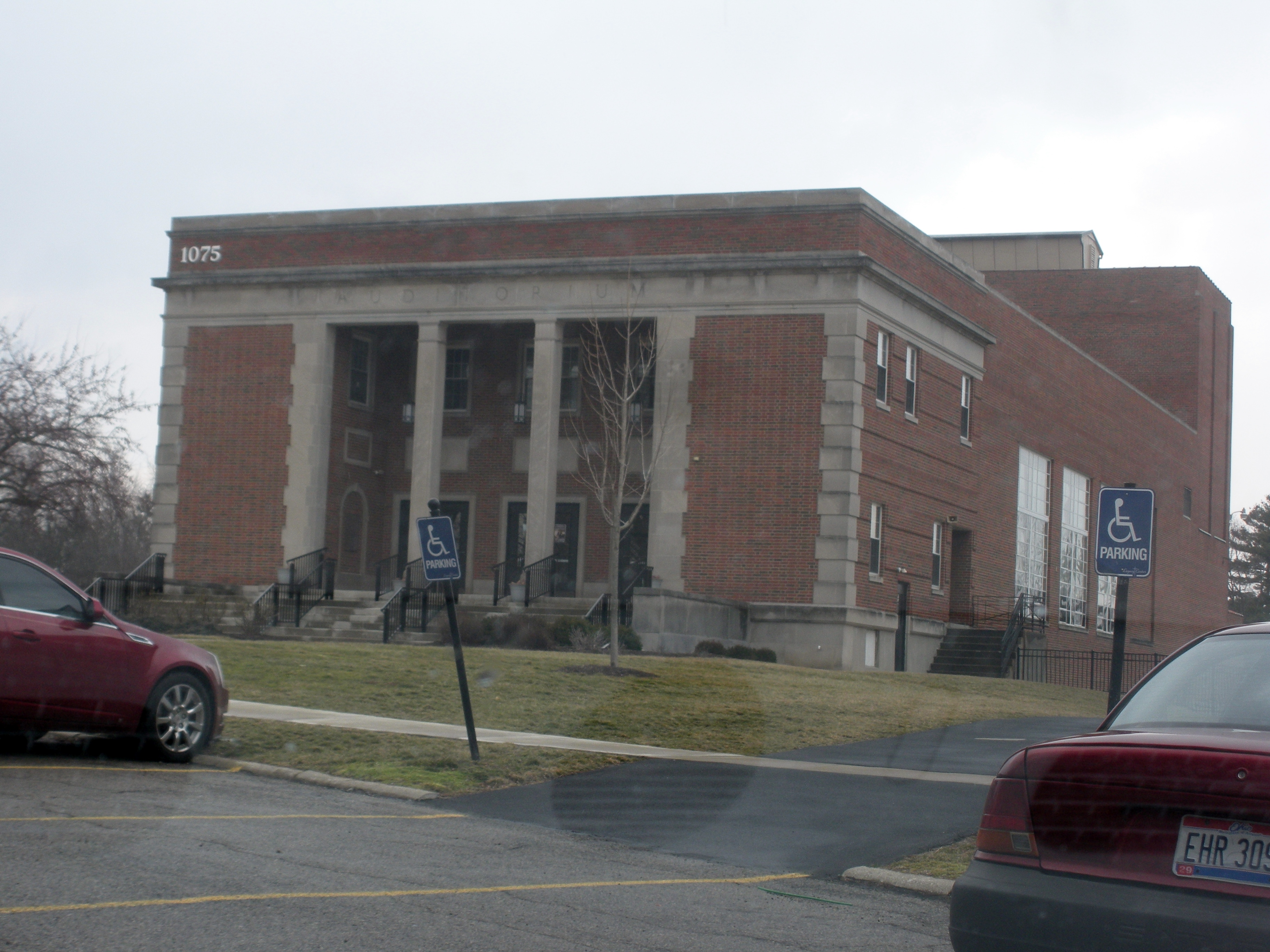
J.R. Rooney Auditorium at Legacy Campus, home of the Legacy Dramatic Arts Department
