= Drew Brads =

American speedcuber (born 1999)

- Born: August 12, 1999 (age 27)
- Education: Cedarville University
- Known for: Speedcubing

Drew Brads (born August 12, 1999) is an American Rubik's Cube speedsolver.

== Education ==
Brads graduated as valedictorian from Legacy Christian Academy in 2018. He received an MDiv from Cedarville University

== Rubik's Cube career ==
Brads formerly held the world record single Pyraminx solve with his 1.32 second solve on 24 October 2015 at Lexington Fall 2015. He also formerly held six world record Pyraminx averages from 2014 to 2017.

Brads also held the North American record 3x3x3 solve, 4.76 seconds, set on 4 March 2017 at Bluegrass Spring 2017.

Brads is a 3-time US national Pyraminx champion, winning in 2014, 2015, and 2017, and 2-time world Pyraminx world champion, winning in 2013 and 2017. Between 11 December 2011 and 30 July 2016 Brads competed in Pyraminx in 19 competitions, including two US National Championships, and took first in every round of competition. At US Nationals 2015, Brads won 3x3x3 and Skewb in addition to Pyraminx.
