= Ohio Soldiers' and Sailors' Orphans' Home =

Ohio Soldiers' and Sailors' Orphans Home
- Ohio Veterans' Children's Home
- Woodrow Wilson High School
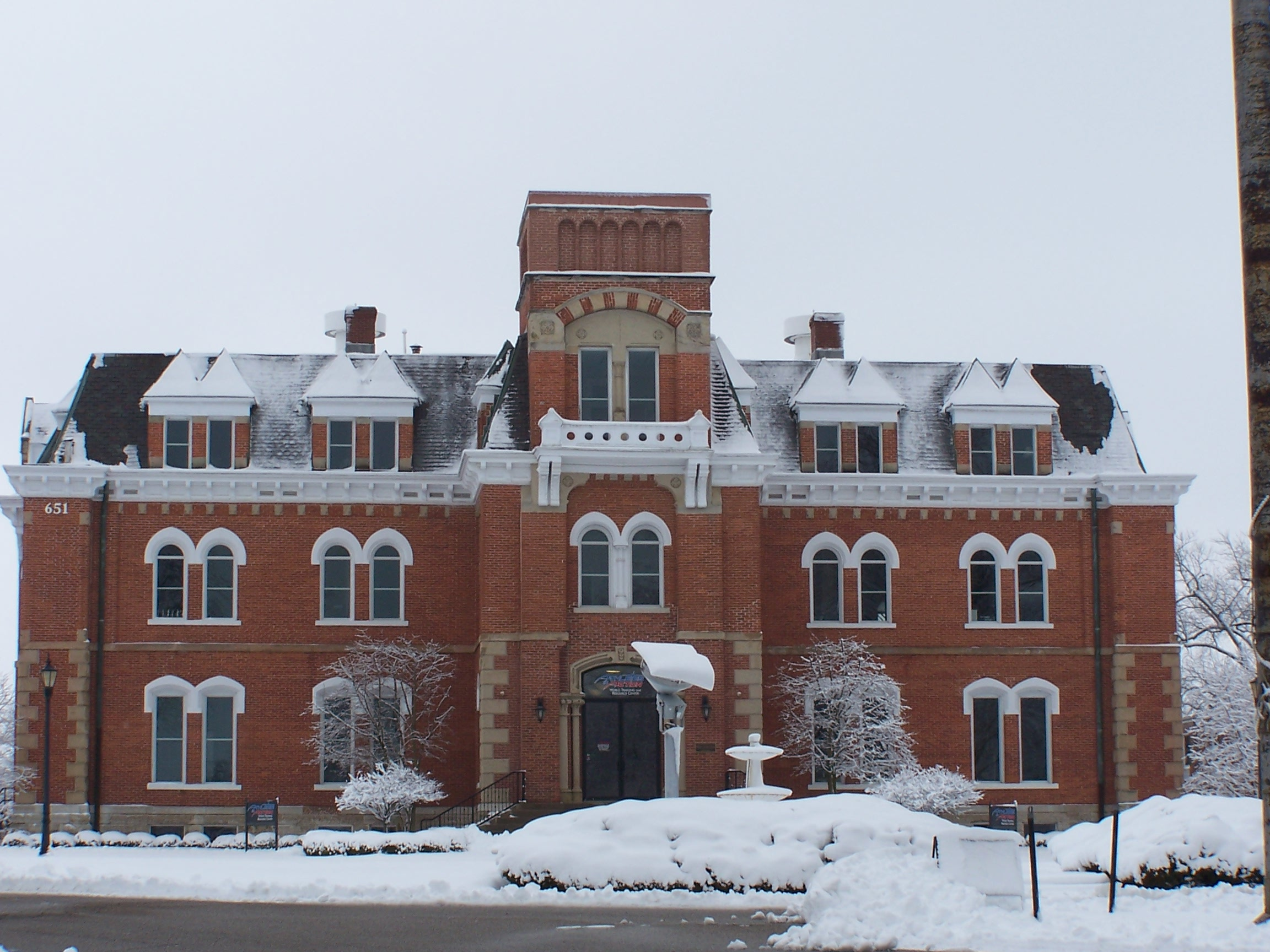
- OS&SO's Main Building as it appeared in March 2013, now Athletes in Action's headquarters.

Location
- 690 Home Avenue; Xenia, (Greene County), Ohio 45385; United States
- Coordinates: 39°39′53″N 83°55′28″W

Information
- Established: 1869
- Founder: Grand Army of the Republic
- Closed: July 1, 1997
- Campuses: 1
- Campus size: 253 acres
- Campus type: Small city
- Colour
- Mascot: Cadets
- Publication: Home Review
- Newspaper: Home Weekly
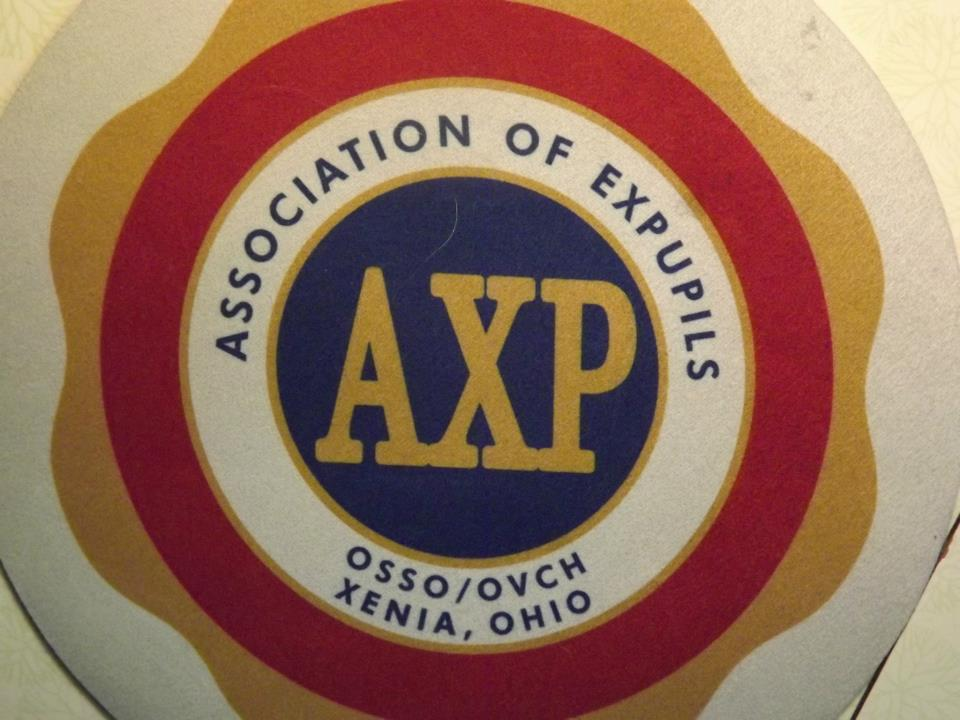
- The logo of the Association of Ex-Pupils

The Ohio Soldiers' and Sailors' Orphans' Home (Later known as the Ohio Veterans' Children's Home) and sometimes abbreviated OS&SO/OVCH, was a children's home that was located in Xenia, Ohio. It is now home to Legacy Christian Academy, Athletes in Action, and other Christian ministries.

== Early history ==
Money was collected from taxes levied during the Civil War to care for the dependents of soldiers, but the government mishandled the money. By the war's end, several families were living in county infirmities under deplorable conditions. Seeing this, soldiers still living began contacting government officials, requesting that something be done to help the families of the fallen soldiers. Eventually, the Grand Army of the Republic (GAR), a federation the veterans formed after the close of the Civil War to foster comradeship, financed the purchase of a home for veteran's orphans in the city of Xenia. Xenia was chosen because people from Greene County had long been interested in the plight of the veterans' families, and Reverend P.C. Prugh had been raising funds for the project for some time. Rev. Prugh is thus referred to as the "Father" of the movement to establish a home. Additionally, Chaplain George W. Collier is credited with being the first to suggest the idea of a home to the GAR. In 1869, the Grand Army of the Republic established the Ohio Soldiers' and Sailors' Orphans' Home in Xenia, Ohio.

The "Home" was commissioned by Abraham Lincoln, and was a self-contained community with a farm, dairy barn, hospital, power/heating plant, gymnasium, banquet hall, chapel, and residence halls. Lincoln challenged the states to bind up the wounds of the Civil War by meeting the needs of widows and orphans created by the conflict. Ohio members of the Grand Army of the Republic took up that challenge, and, through a donation of 100 acres by a Xenia farmer, created the Ohio Soldiers' and Sailors' Orphans' Home. This institution was the predecessor of the Ohio Veterans' Children's Home. In 1870, the State of Ohio assumed control of the home. The Ohio Soldiers' and Sailors' Orphans' Home was originally located in a rented building in Xenia, Ohio. In 1869, Xenia residents provided the GAR with 150 acres of land to build a permanent facility.

== "Home Life" ==
The home conducted church services, established a regular school curriculum as well as education in several trades, started a library, and supplied on-site medical attention. The list of trades is impressive, including tin smithing; wood carving; knitting; dress making; tailoring; farm, florist, and garden work; butchering and slaughtering; telegraphy, and blacksmithing. The children also enjoyed such extra-curricular activities as choir, orchestra, concert band, military band, drum corps, and athletics. Beginning in April 1876, the home put out their own paper, titled the Home Weekly. Children were discharged from the home at the age of 16.

== Athletics ==
Athletic teams at Woodrow Wilson High School competed as the "Cadets". State Championships and athletic records were transferred to Xenia High School upon the home's closure.

- OHSAA State Championships:
  - Track and Field: 1940, 1941, 1942, 1955, 1956, 1958

== The Campus ==
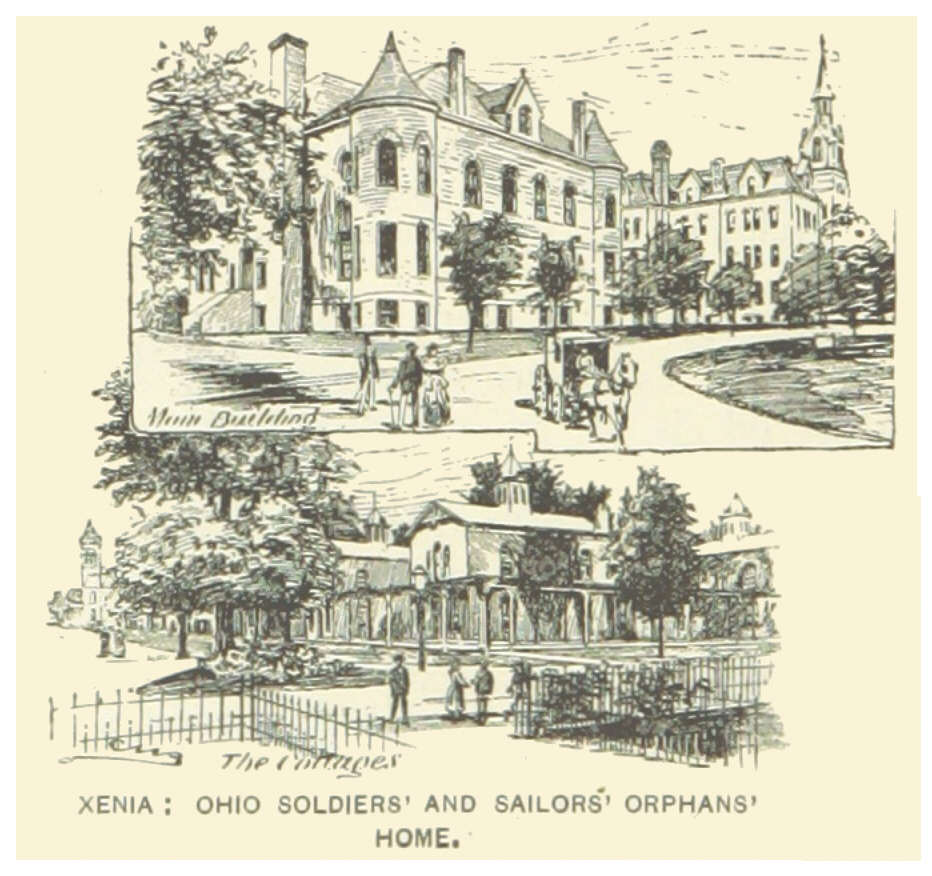
1891 book illustration

The campus of the former Ohio Soldiers' and Sailors' Orphans' Home is located in the southeastern corner of the city of Xenia, close to US 35 and US 68. Many of the original buildings from the home remain and are still in use to this day, although in 2013, many abandoned buildings on the property were demolished.

- Main Building
  - Built around 1870, was the main administration building for the home. It was renovated and is now in use as an office and conference center for Athletes in Action.
- Collier Chapel
  - Collier Chapel, built in 1873, is one of the oldest buildings that remains standing on campus. It is used currently a rentable venue for wedding ceremonies. It was renovated around 1994, but is currently in need of repairs. Behind Collier Chapel lies a nearly 100-year-old cemetery which is the resting place for many of the home's victims of a 1918 diphtheria outbreak.
- Lincoln Building
  - Built around 1944, Lincoln is the main school building on campus, formerly housing Woodrow Wilson High School. It currently is the main building for Legacy Christian Academy. It features two floors plus a basement that feature classrooms, offices, a large library, music room, and a teachers lounges.
- Barnett Building
  - Built in 1931. Also called the "trades building", was used as a second school building. Currently used by Legacy Christian Academy. Features classrooms and offices.
- Gymnasium
  - Built in 1924, was home to the "Cadets" sports teams. Currently is home to Legacy Christian "Knights" sports teams. Features mezzanine level, locker rooms, swimming pool, and weight room.
- Julian R. Rooney Auditorium
  - The auditorium, built around 1936, was the venue for the home's drama productions among other things. It is now the venue for Legacy's drama productions, chapels, and assemblies. The basement is now used by LCA as a cafeteria.
- Cottages
  - Roosevelt: Roosevelt Cottage, a large dormitory near the back of the property, still stands today. It was completely restored and is now used by Athletes in Action as a residence hall and is named the "Brown Family Retreat Center".
  - Hayes Hall: Hayes Hall was originally built as a hospital in the 1920s, and then became a girls' dormitory. It is now used as office space for the various ministries that exist today on the campus. It too has been completely renovated.
  - There were a number of cottages on the campus, which served as dormitories for the home residents and students. In the last days of use these buildings were not well maintained and during the period of time when the campus was unused the buildings began to deteriorate. Due to the state of disrepair these were not used when Legacy Ministries International took control of the property in 1999. A few of the cottages were renovated for use as residence halls for Athletes in Action. The remaining abandoned cottages were all demolished in 2013.

== Photo gallery ==
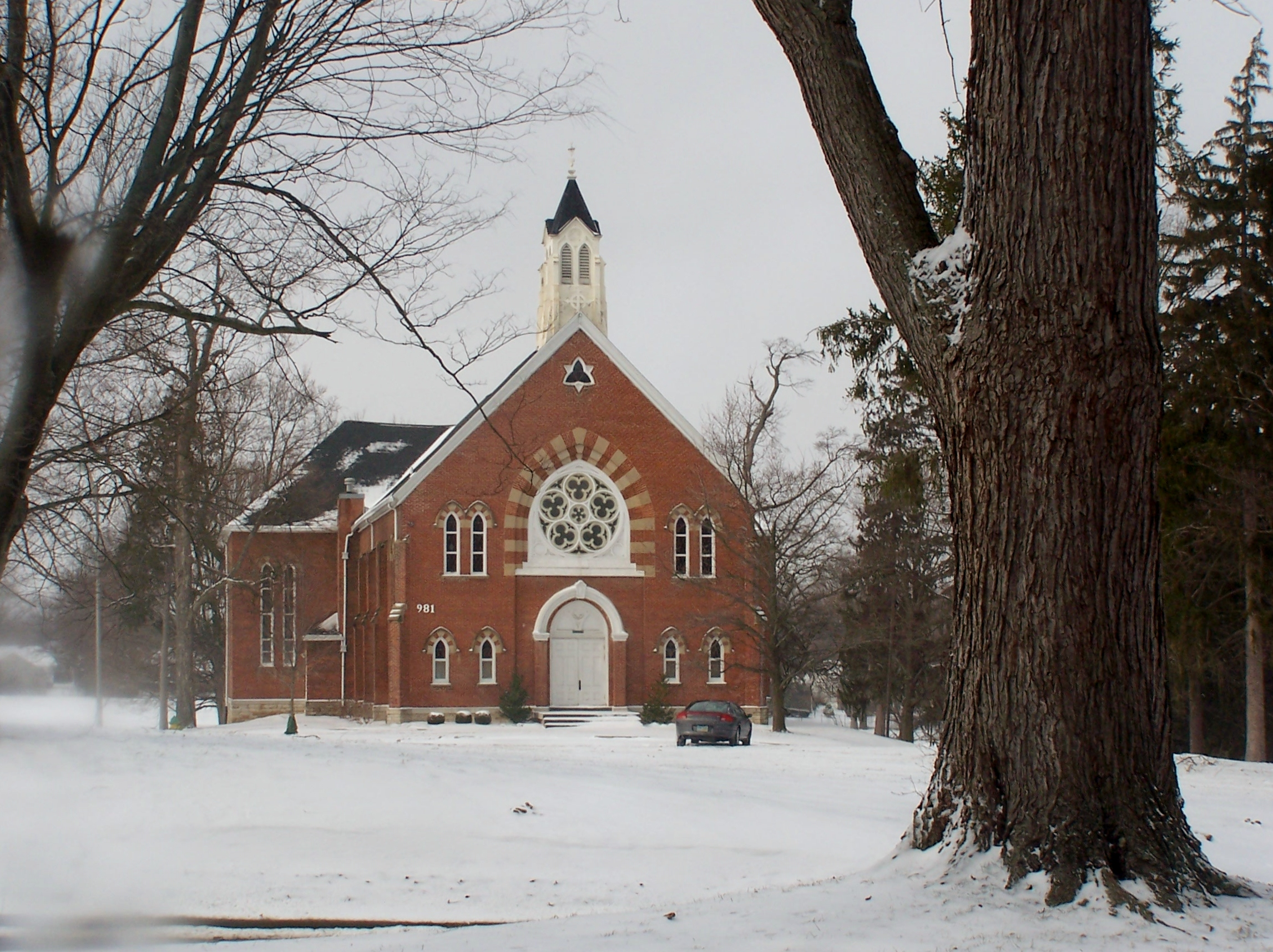
Collier Chapel (1873)

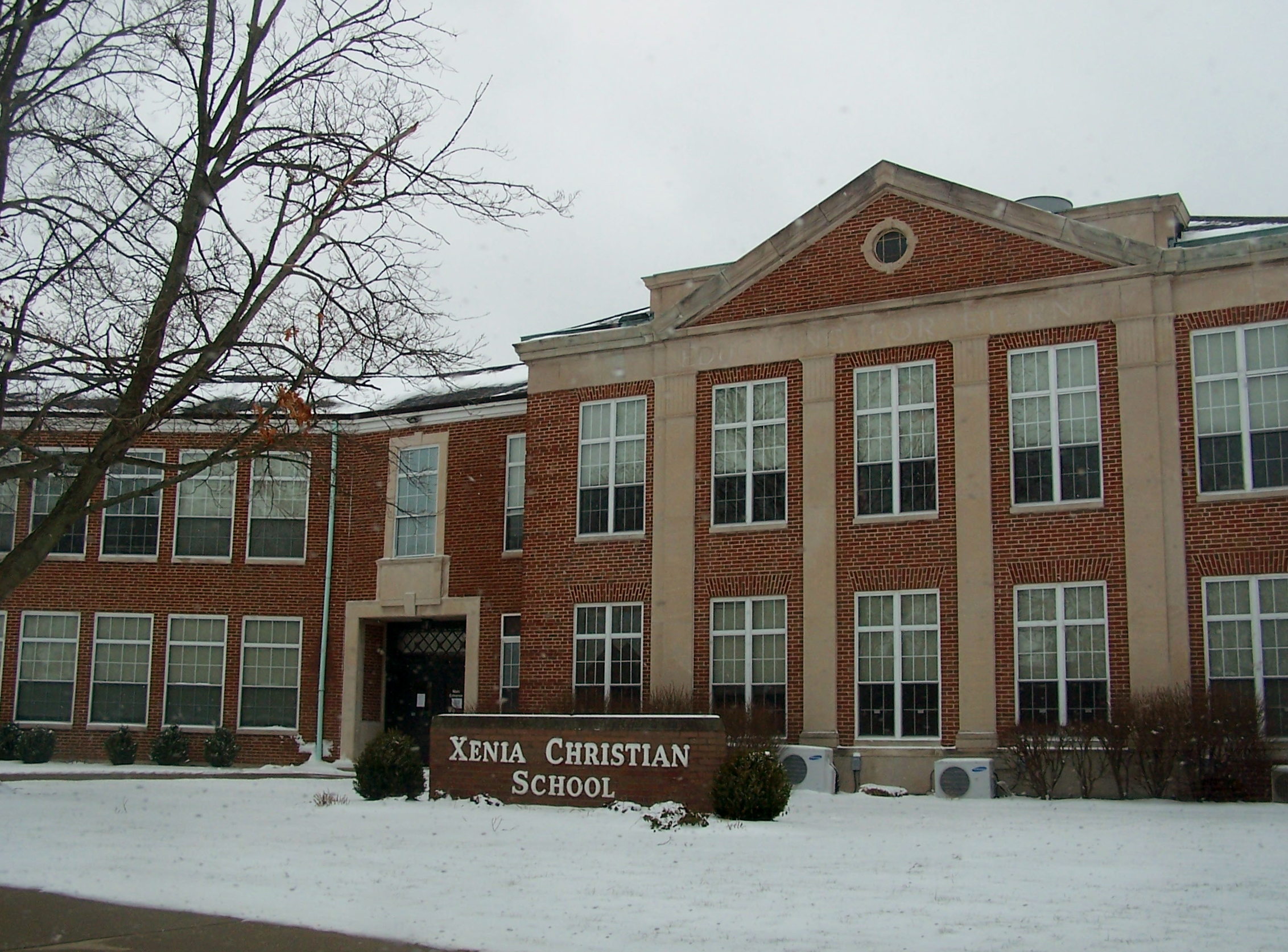
Lincoln Building (1944)

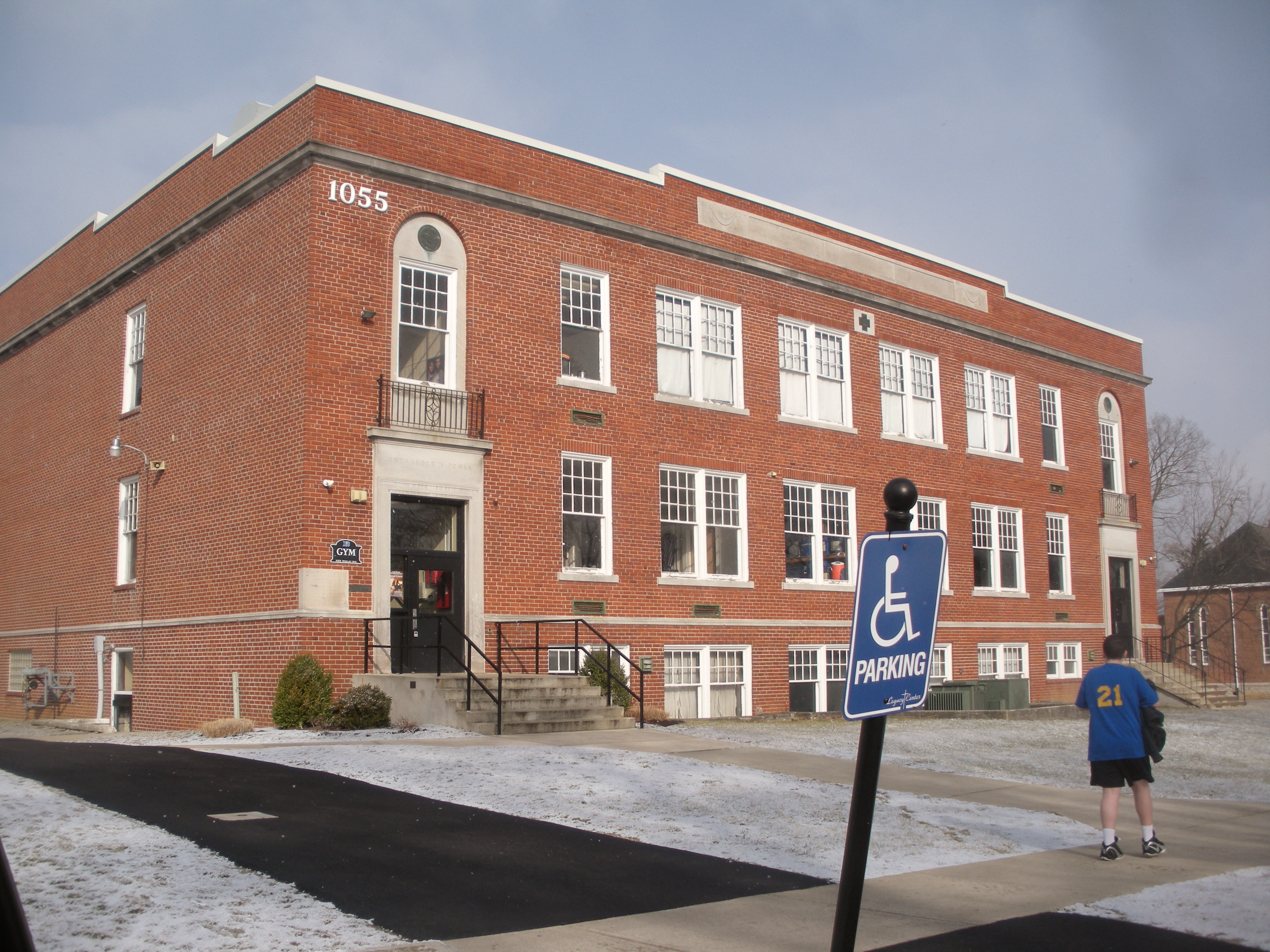
Gymnasium (1924)

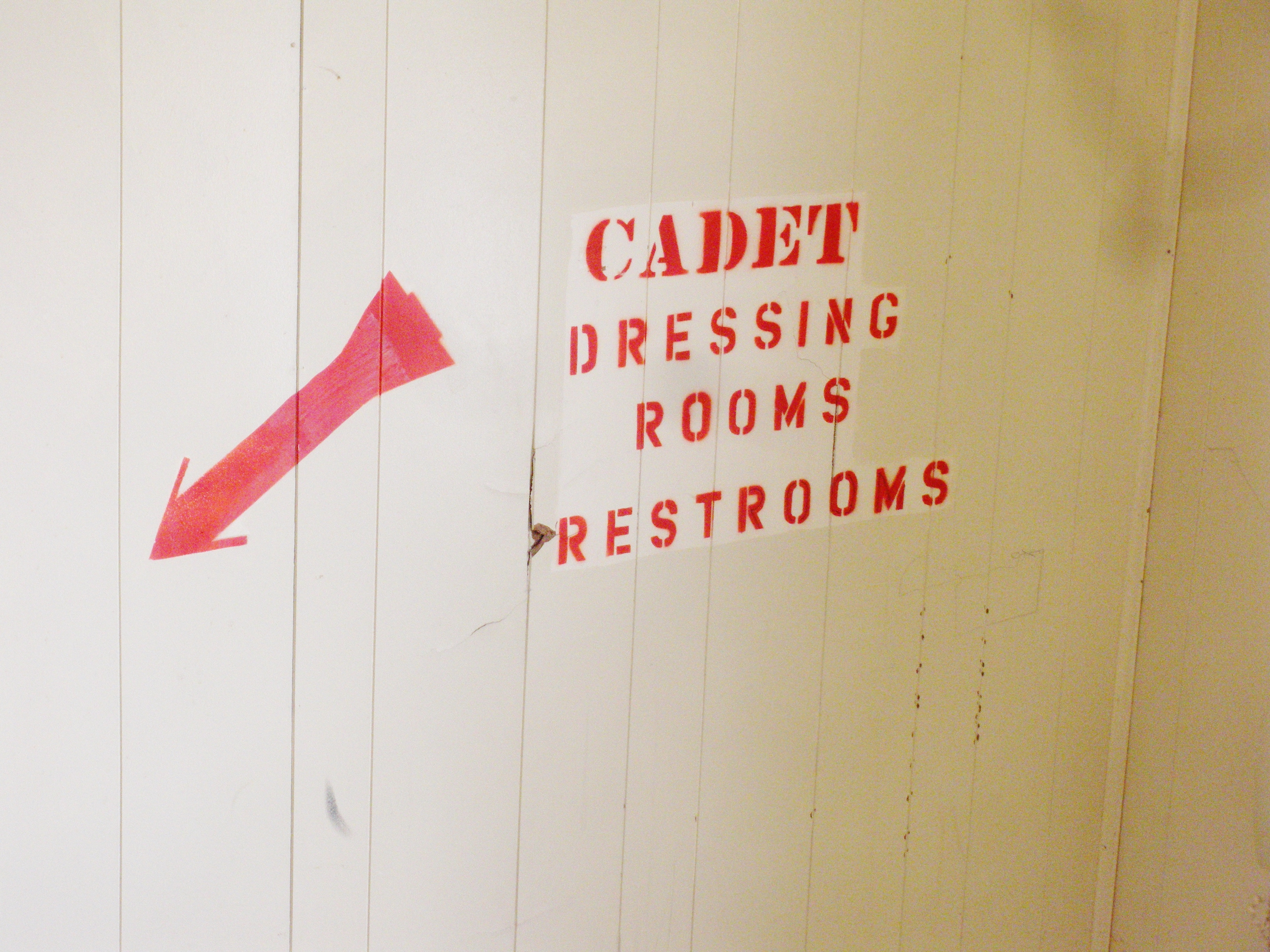
Gymnasium wall in 2013, with Cadets name still intact

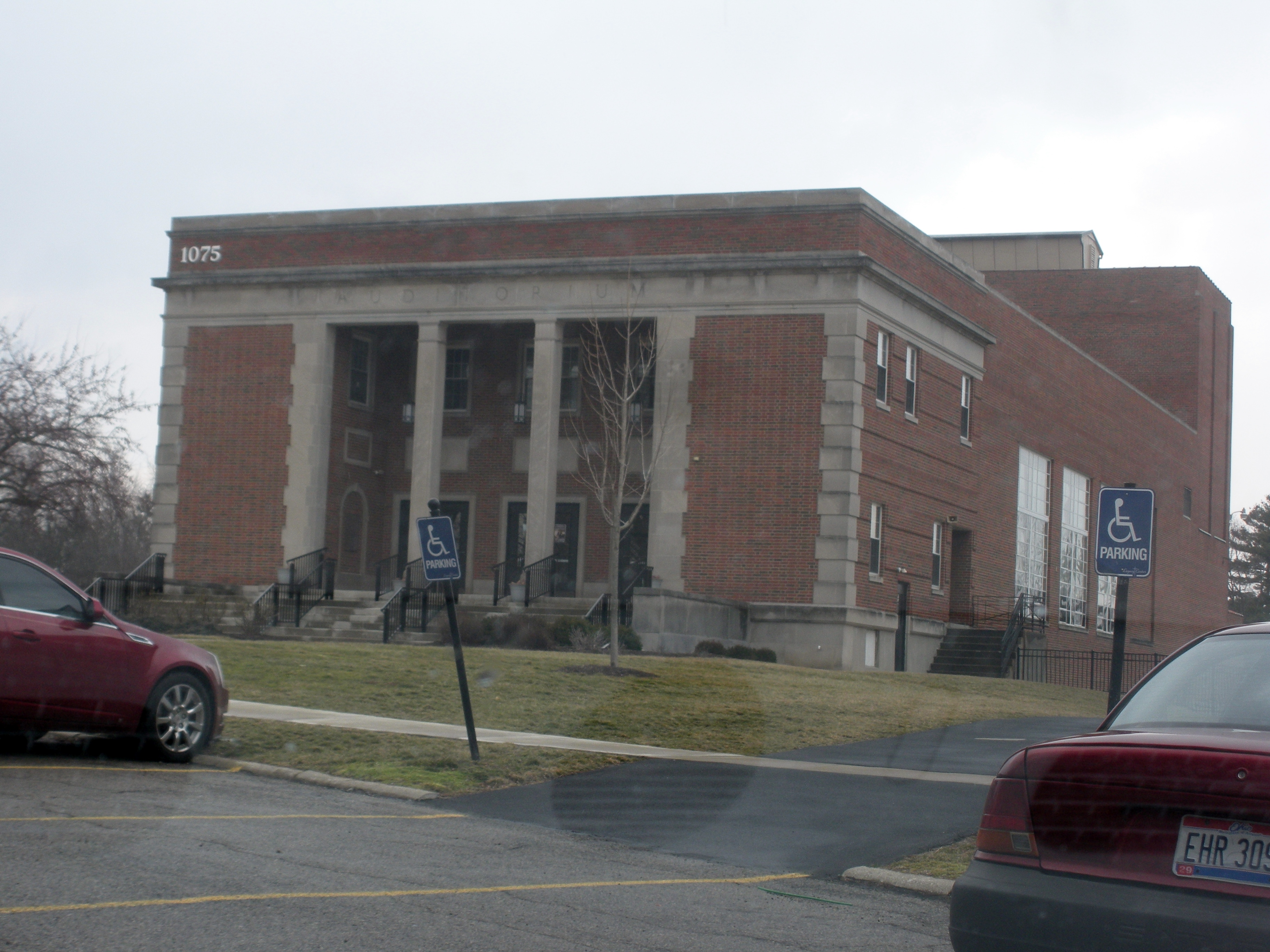
Julian R. Rooney Auditorium (1949)

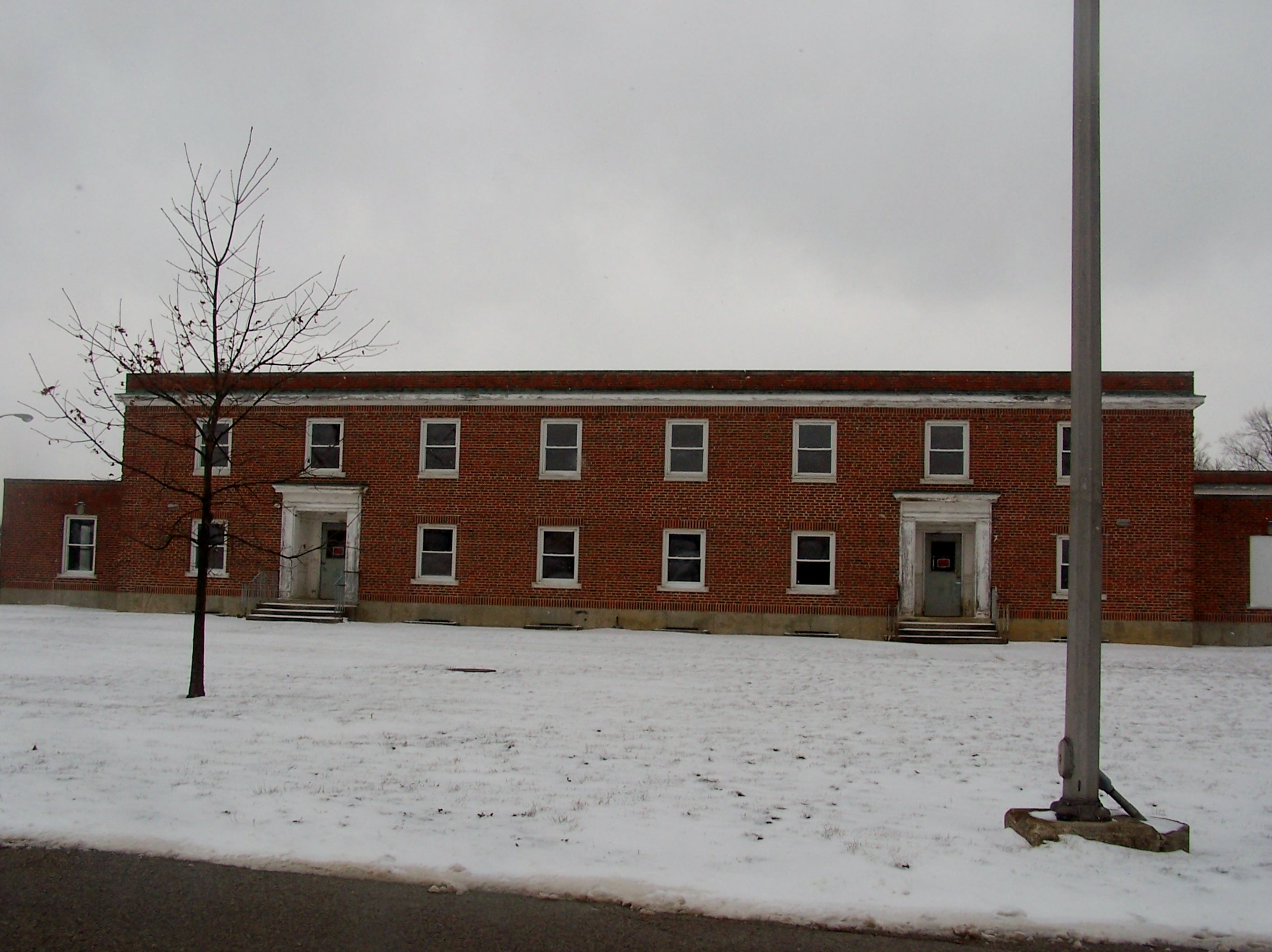
A cottage shortly before demolition
