= Ohio Civil Rights Commission =

Ohio state commission

- Ohio Civil Rights Commission logo

Agency overview
- Formed: July 1959
- Headquarters: Columbus, Ohio
- Agency executive: Angela Phelps-White, Esq.., Executive Director
- Website: crc.ohio.gov

The Ohio Civil Rights Commission is a commission of the Ohio State Government formed in 1959, whose duties are specified in Section 4112 of the Ohio Revised Code.

The Commission's primary function is to enforce state laws about discrimination, and they oversee outreach regarding such matters. It consists of a five-member board of Commissioners appointed by the state governor and approximately 90 employees.

== History ==
Ohio Civil Rights Comm'n v. Dayton Christian Schools, Inc. was a U.S. Supreme Court case involving this commission regarding a sex discrimination case in which a ruling was made that a court had ruled on the matter in question in error without giving sufficient time for the Commission to conclude an investigation.

== In-House Discrimination Lawsuits ==
In March 2025, the Ohio Civil Rights Commission paid $650,000 to settle two employment discrimination lawsuits from former employees. The lawsuits alleged that director, Angela Phelps-White, discriminated against female employees in favor of male employees. The commission's HR director recalled Angela Phelps-White saying, "We need more males in these areas. I like my eye candy."

== See also ==
- List of civil rights agencies in the United States
