= Ohio Civil Rights Commission v. Dayton Christian Schools, Inc. =

Ohio Civil Rights Comm'n v. Dayton Christian Schools, Inc.
- Supreme Court of the United States

Argued March 26, 1986 Decided June 27, 1986
- Full case name: Ohio Civil Rights Commission v. Dayton Christian Schools, Inc.
- Citations: 477 U.S. 619 (more) 106 S. Ct. 2718; 91 L. Ed. 2d 512; 1986 U.S. LEXIS 71

Case history
- Prior: Appeal from the United States Court of Appeals for the Sixth Circuit

Holding
- The District Court erred in failing to abstain from hearing a constitutional claim while state administrative investigations were pending.

Court membership
- Chief Justice Warren E. Burger Associate Justices William J. Brennan Jr. · Byron White; Thurgood Marshall · Harry Blackmun; Lewis F. Powell Jr. · William Rehnquist; John P. Stevens · Sandra Day O'Connor

Case opinions
- Majority: Rehnquist, joined by Burger, White, Powell, O'Connor
- Concurrence: Stevens, joined by Brennan, Marshall, Blackmun

Ohio Civil Rights Commission v. Dayton Christian Schools, Inc., 477 U.S. 619 (1986), reversed a lower court's decision and stated that the lower court should not have heard the case until after the Ohio Civil Rights Commission had concluded their investigation. The commission argued that the non-renewal and firing constituted unlawful sex discrimination, while the school argued that this was an ecclesiastical matter not suitable for review by civil authorities.

== Case facts ==
Seal of the Ohio Civil Rights Commission

Linda Hoskinson was hired as an elementary school teacher at Dayton Christian Schools during the 1978-1979 school year. Her employment contract required following a "biblical chain of command" in lieu of using the state legal system and a signed statement of faith. In 1979, Hoskinson became pregnant. After informing the principal, her contract to teach was not renewed as organizational leaders believed that mothers should stay home with their pre-school-aged children. When Hoskinson hired an attorney, she was immediately terminated for failing to follow the internal dispute resolution protocol. She then filed a complaint with the Ohio Civil Rights Commission, claiming that the non-renewal of the contract was sexual discrimination under ORC 4112.02A, and that the termination was in violation of 4112.02I. The commission determined that there was sufficient probable cause to believe that the school had discriminated against Hoskinson based on her sex, and retaliated against her for asserting her rights. The school claimed that the First Amendment prevented the commission from having jurisdiction, that the civil rights statutes were unconstitutionally overreaching and appealed to the US District Court seeking a permanent injunction against the state.

Title VII of the Civil Rights Act generally permits religious organizations to require membership in their religious group as a bona fide occupational qualifications. Unaddressed was one of the school's claims, that by requiring the school to hire a teacher that disobeyed the church's teachings, they would not be able to demonstrate to students that the church's doctrine was important.

== Opinion ==
Justice Rehnquist, writing for the majority of the court, found that the District Court erred in hearing the request for an injunction as a federal court should abstain until after the commission had brought in a finding. The Court of Appeals erred in ruling that the commission's jurisdiction violated both the Free Exercise and Establishment clauses of the First Amendment and the Equal Protection Clause of the Fourteenth Amendment, as instead they should have invoked federal abstention doctrine.

== See also ==
- Geduldig v. Aiello (1974)
- Hosannna-Tabor Lutheran Church & School v. EEOC (2012)
- List of United States Supreme Court cases, volume 477
