= Dayton Christian High School =

Coordinates: 39°36′51″N 84°12′39″W

Location
- 9391 Washington Church Rd. Miamisburg, Ohio 45342; United States

Information
- Type: Secondary
- Founder: Claude (Bud) E. Schindler, Jr.
- Headmaster: Matt Baker
- Enrollment: 1000 (Approx.)
- Colors: Purple & Gold
- Mascot: "Zeke" the Warrior
- Annual tuition: $9,400 (high school)
- Website: www.daytonchristian.com

Dayton Christian High School is a private, non-denominational Christian high school located in Miamisburg, Ohio, United States, educating approximately 1000 students. Dayton Christian integrates Biblical instruction into its curriculum.

Dayton Christian's mission is "Educating for Eternity." The school's founder, Rev. Claude (Bud) E. Schindler, Jr., was formerly an NCR sales executive. As of 2026, Mr. Matt Baker is the school system's Head of School. In 2004 the school moved from the historic Julienne school building on Homewood Avenue near downtown Dayton to the former NCR World Training Center near Miamisburg.

== Sports ==
=== Swimming ===
The Dayton Christian High School swim team won All-Conference in the Metro Buckeye Conference for two consecutive seasons: 2018-2019 and 2019–2020.

== Ohio High School Athletic Association State Championships ==
- Boys Cross Country – 1984
- Boys Track and Field - 1982, 1996, 2007
- Boys Wrestling - 2015

== Notable alumni ==
- Romain Sato '00, professional basketball player
- Luke Grimes '02, actor (True Blood, Fifty Shades of Grey, Yellowstone)

== See also ==
- Civil Rights Commission v. Dayton Christian Schools
