= List of alumni of Saint Ignatius High School (Cleveland) =

This is a list of notable alumni of Saint Ignatius High School in Cleveland, Ohio, United States.

== Arts and entertainment ==
- Brian P. Cleary, 1978 – best-selling author of humorous books for grade-school children; over 2 million books in print
- Mark Hentemann, 1987 – screenwriter, former showrunner, and long-time executive producer of the animated series Family Guy
- Dave Hill, 1987 – comedian, radio host, writer, musician and actor
- Robert Litz, 1968 – playwright, director, critic, senior resident playwright at Elephant Theatre Company in Hollywood, CA
- Greg Murray, 2000 – photographer
- Glenn O'Brien, 1965 – writer, GQ columnist, editor of Interview magazine, host of TV Party
- Rory O'Malley, 1999 – Broadway actor, Book of Mormon, Hamilton
- Jack Riley, 1953– comedian, actor, The Bob Newhart Show, Spaceballs, Rugrats
- Brian K. Vaughan, 1994 – writer of Y: The Last Man and TV series Lost

== Business ==
- Charles Geschke, 1956 – co-founder of Adobe Systems
- Murlan J. "Jerry" Murphy, 1935 – Murphy's Oil Soap Company
- James E. Rohr, 1966 – CEO of PNC Financial Services

== Education ==
- James Danko, 1971 – president of Butler University
- Robert Rudolph Ivany – retired major general in the United States Army, and the eighth president of the University of St. Thomas in Houston, TX

== Episcopacy ==
- Floyd Lawrence Begin, 1920 – first bishop of the Roman Catholic Diocese of Oakland
- Timothy Broglio, 1970 – archbishop of the Roman Catholic Archdiocese for the Military Services, USA and president of the United States Conference of Catholic Bishops
- William Michael Cosgrove, 1934 – former bishop of the Roman Catholic Diocese of Belleville, Illinois
- James Anthony Griffin, 1952 – bishop emeritus of the Roman Catholic Diocese of Columbus
- John Raphael Hagan, 1912 – former auxiliary bishop of the Roman Catholic Diocese of Cleveland and titular bishop of Limata
- Joseph Patrick Hurley (Archbishop), 1915 – former bishop of the Roman Catholic Diocese of St. Augustine, chargé d'affaires of the Apostolic Delegation in Japan from 1933 to 1934, regent ad interim to Yugoslavia
- Daniel Ivancho (resigned and laicized), 1926 – former bishop of the Byzantine Catholic Metropolitan Church of Pittsburgh
- Charles Hubert Le Blond (C. Herbert), 1903 – former bishop of the Roman Catholic Diocese of Saint Joseph and namesake of Bishop LeBlond High School
- James A. McFadden, 1895 – first bishop of the Roman Catholic Diocese of Youngstown
- Patrick Thomas O'Reilly, 1920 – first bishop of the Roman Catholic Diocese of Springfield in Massachusetts
- Alexander James Quinn (A. James Quinn), 1950 – former auxiliary bishop of the Roman Catholic Diocese of Cleveland and Titular Bishop of Socia
- David Walkowiak, 1971 – bishop of the Roman Catholic Diocese of Grand Rapids, Michigan

== Politics and government ==
- Richard F. Abel, 1951 – retired brigadier general of the United States Air Force
- William M. Brodhead, 1959 – United States congressman from Michigan, 1974–1982
- Thomas P. Carney, 1959 – retired lieutenant general of the United States Army
- Joe Cimperman, 1988 – former 7-term Cleveland City Council member and president of Global Cleveland
- Michael P. Donnelly – Ohio Supreme Court justice
- Michael A. Feighan – former Democratic member of the U.S. House of Representatives (1943–1971)
- Anthony Gonzalez, 2003 – former Republican member of the United States House of Representatives Ohio's 16th congressional district
- Ted Lieu, 1987 – Democratic member of the United States House of Representatives, representing California's 33rd congressional district since 2015
- Martin J. Sweeney, 1981 – former president of Cleveland City Council
- Robert E. Sweeney – former Democratic member of the U.S. House of Representatives (1965–1967)

== Law and order ==
- Frank D. Celebrezze I – judge; replaced Eliot Ness as Cleveland's safety director
- David Ferrie, 1935 – purportedly involved in John F. Kennedy's assassination
- Danny Greene – expelled from St. Ignatius, president of Longshoremen's Association, Local 1317, gangster, and racketeer
- Francis E. Sweeney Sr., 1952 – retired Ohio Supreme Court justice

== Journalism ==
- Robert Sam Anson, 1963 – a master of the long-form magazine story, he penned six non-fiction books and scores of articles for Esquire, Life, Time, The Atlantic, and Vanity Fair
- Jerome Corsi, 1964 – outspoken prolific conservative author; holds a PhD in political science from Harvard University
- Nick Lowe – vice president of content, digital publishing and executive editor at Marvel Comics
- David Martosko, 1987 – U.S. political editor for The Daily Mail
- Bill Sammon, 1978 – managing editor, Fox News Washington

== Science ==
- Paul F. McManamon – known for his work in optics and photonics, as well as sensors, countermeasures, and directed energy
- Tom Van Flandern, 1958 – astronomer

== Sports ==
- Jacob Bell, 1999 – professional football player in the National Football League (NFL)
- LeCharles Bentley, 1998 – professional football player in the NFL
- Mike Buddie – professional baseball player in Major League Baseball
- Michael J. Cleary, 1952 – executive director of National Association of Collegiate Directors of Athletics
- Jack Corrigan, 1970 – TV and radio announcer
- Derek Dietrich, 2007 – professional baseball player in MLB
- Pickles Dillhoefer, 1910 – former professional baseball player in MLB
- Larry Dolan, 1951 – owner, Cleveland Guardians
- Brian Dowling, 1965 – professional football player in the NFL (inspiration for the character B.D. in the Doonesbury comic strip)
- Ed Ecker, 1940 – former professional football player for the NFL
- Liam Eichenberg, 2016 – professional football player for the Miami Dolphins
- Tommy Eichenberg, 2019 – college football linebacker for the Ohio State Buckeyes
- John Fanta, 2013 – college basketball broadcaster
- Luke Farrell, 2009 – professional baseball player in Major League Baseball
- Dan Fox, 2009 – professional football player in the NFL
- Jonathan Gannon – Defensive Coordinator of Green Bay Packers
- Chris Gizzi – football player and strength coach, Green Bay Packers
- Anthony Gonzalez, 2003 – politician and former professional football player in the NFL
- Drew Haddad, 1996 – professional football player in the NFL and NFL Europe
- Mike Hegan, 1960 – professional baseball player in Major League Baseball; TV and radio announcer for the Cleveland Indians
- Chris Hovan, 1996 – professional football player in the NFL
- Brian Hoyer, 2004 – professional football player in the NFL
- Aidan Hubbard, 2021 – professional football player for the Seattle Seahawks
- Steve Huntz – professional baseball player in Major League Baseball
- Dre'Mont Jones, 2014 – professional football player for the Seattle Seahawks
- Joe Kantor, 1961 – former professional football player for the Washington Redskins
- Matt Kata, 1996 – professional baseball player in MLB
- Anthony Kelly, 1999 – professional lacrosse player in Major League Lacrosse
- Darian Kinnard, 2018 – professional NFL offensive tackle for the Kansas City Chiefs
- Chuck Kyle, 1968 – coached St. Ignatius' football team to a record 11 Division I State Titles: 1988, 1989, 1991, 1992, 1993, 1994, 1995, 1999, 2001, 2008, and 2011. Kyle also coached the Wildcats to National Championships in 1989, 1993, 1995, and 2008.
- Oliver Luck, 1978 – professional football player in the NFL; administrator in NFL Europe; athletic director, West Virginia University
- Timothy Mack, 1990 – 2004 Olympics gold medalist (pole vault)
- Nick Margevicius, 2014 – professional baseball player in Major League Baseball
- Shonn Miller, 2011 – professional basketball player
- Justin Morrow, 2006 – professional soccer player in Major League Soccer
- Scott Mutryn – professional football player in the NFL and NFL Europe
- Dan O'Leary, 1996 – former professional football player for the NFL
- Dave Ragone, 1998 – professional football player in NFL Europe; professional football coach in the NFL
- Barry Rice, 2006 – professional soccer player in Major League Soccer
- Garry Roggenburk – professional baseball player in Major League Baseball
- Jake Ryan, 2010 – professional football player in the NFL
- Mike Wilhelm, 1985 – former assistant coach for the Chicago Bulls and current advance scout
