= High school ice hockey in Ohio =

Ohio has more than 80 high schools with varsity ice hockey teams that participate in interscholastic competition, as well as more than 20 club high school teams composed of players from numerous high schools in a specific area. Since 1978, ice hockey has been an officially sanctioned sport by the Ohio High School Athletic Association (OHSAA). The club teams play under USA Hockey sanction and also have both junior varsity and varsity divisions.

== State champions ==
Year	Champion
2025	Upper Arlington
2024	Cleveland St. Ignatius
2023	Olentangy Liberty
2022	Gates Mills Gilmour Academy
2021	Toledo St. Francis de Sales
2020	Cancelled due to the coronavirus pandemic
2019	Cleveland St. Ignatius
2018	Cleveland St. Ignatius
2017	Cleveland St. Ignatius
2016	Cleveland St. Ignatius
2015	Toledo St. Francis de Sales
2014	Sylvania Northview & Cleveland St. Ignatius **
2013	Shaker Heights
2012	Sylvania Northview
2011	Toledo St. Francis de Sales
2010	Cleveland St. Ignatius
2009	Hunting Valley University School
2008	Lakewood St. Edward
2007	Toledo St. John's Jesuit
2006	Parma Padua Franciscan
2005	Lakewood St. Edward
2004	Lakewood St. Edward
2003	Hunting Valley University School
2002	Lakewood St. Edward
2001	Shaker Heights
2000	Cleveland St. Ignatius
1999	Bowling Green *
1998	Bowling Green
1997	Bowling Green
1996	Lakewood St. Edward
1995	Lakewood St. Edward
1994	Lakewood St. Edward
1993	Shaker Heights
1992	Lakewood St. Edward
1991	Bowling Green
1990	Lakewood St. Edward
1989	Parma Padua Franciscan
1988	Parma Padua Franciscan
1987	Cleveland Heights
1986	Lakewood St. Edward
1985	Lakewood St. Edward
1984	Bowling Green
1983	Findlay
1982	Kent Roosevelt
1981	Shaker Heights
1980	Bowling Green
1979	Centerville
1978	Findlay

* 1999 Title game was won by St. John's Jesuit High School, but later forfeited due to the use of an ineligible player. It was the first state championship game forfeiture in the history of the OHSAA.
** co-champions - Game called a 1-1 tie after 7 overtimes

== Conferences ==
- Capital Hockey Conference
- Great Lakes Hockey League
- Greater Cleveland High School Hockey League
- Northwest Hockey Conference
- Southwest Ohio High School Hockey League
- Greater Ohio Hockey League*
