= Bob Whidden =

Canadian ice hockey player and coach

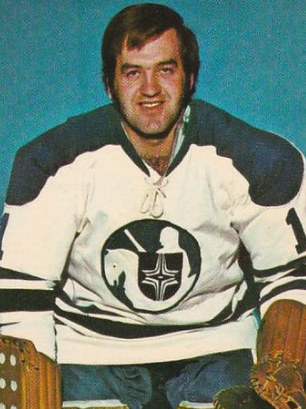
- Whidden in 1972–73
- Born: July 27, 1946 (age 79) Sudbury, Ontario, Canada
- Height: 5 ft 10 in (178 cm)
- Weight: 175 lb (79 kg; 12 st 7 lb)
- Position: Goaltender
- Caught: Left
- Played for: Cleveland Crusaders
- Playing career: 1967–1977

Robert J. "Bob" Whidden (born July 27, 1946) is a Canadian former professional ice hockey player and high school ice hockey coach. He played goaltender. He was born in Sudbury, Ontario and was involved in ice hockey in various capacities for over fifty years.

== Playing career ==
Whidden played junior hockey with the Toronto Marlboros of the Ontario Hockey Association (OHA) from 1965 to 1967. In 1967, the Marlboros won the J. Ross Robertson Cup (OHA championship) and the Memorial Cup (Canadian Major Junior championship). He played four years with the Cleveland Crusaders of the World Hockey Association as the back-up to future Hall-of-Famer Gerry Cheevers. He also played with the Rochester Americans and Baltimore Clippers of the American Hockey League, the Charlotte Checkers of the Eastern Hockey League, and the Mohawk Valley Comets of the North American Hockey League.

== Coaching ==
Whidden spent 21 years as the coach of the hockey team at St. Edward High School in Lakewood, Ohio, a suburb of Cleveland. In 1985, his first year as head coach, Whidden led the team to the Ohio High School Athletic Association (OHSAA) State "big school" hockey championship. He coached several players who were drafted by the NHL, including Todd Harkins, Brett Harkins, and Michael Rupp.

Whidden's Eagles won ten OHSAA state titles and seven Baron Cups (Greater Cleveland Championships), and finished with a career record of 507-149-28. His 507 wins rank fourth among coaches in OHSAA history. He retired in March 2005 after winning the tenth title and being named Ohio High School Hockey Coach of the Year by the National Federation of State High School Associations.

In July 2009, St. Edward named Whidden to the school's Athletic Hall of Fame, class of 2009.

== Honours ==
- 1967 Memorial Cup Winner (player)
- 10 OHSAA state titles (coach)
- 7 Baron Cups (coach)
- 500 Wins as a high school head coach
- Cleveland Hockey Legends Ring of Honor
- In 2011, his hometown inducted him into the House of Kin Sudbury Hall of Fame

== Personal life ==
He is married to Irma and has three sons, Rob and Jarrett, both of whom followed in their father's coaching footsteps, and Tyler. Rob took over as head coach of St. Edward's hockey team in 2005 and won the 2008 Ohio state championship. In August 2006, Jarrett was named head coach of Kent State Golden Flashes men's ice hockey team following a minor league career.

== Career statistics ==
=== Regular season and playoffs ===
			Regular season									Playoffs
Season	Team	League	GP	W	L	T	MIN	GA	SO	GAA	SV%	GP	W	L	MIN	GA	SO	GAA	SV%
1965–66	Toronto Marlboros	OHA	20					88	0	4.36		–	–	–	–	–	–	–	–
1966–67	Toronto Marlboros	OHA	22					88	1	3.88		–	–	–	–	–	–	–	–
1967–68	Charlotte Checkers	EHL	65	37	20	8	3874	214	2	3.31	.904	14	–	–	–	–	–	–	–
1968–69	Charlotte Checkers	EHL	50	26	20	4	3000	192	1	3.84		3	–	–	–	–	–	–	–
1969–70	Rochester Americans	AHL	59				3248	221	0	4.08		–	–	–	–	–	–	–	–
1970–71	Baltimore Clippers	AHL	24	11	9	2	1361	81	0	3.56	.889	–	–	–	–	–	–	–	–
1971–72	Baltimore Clippers	AHL	44				2580	143	0	3.33		3	–	–	–	–	–	–	–
1972–73	Cleveland Crusaders	WHA	26	11	12	3	1609	88	0	3.28	.901	–	–	–	–	–	–	–	–
1973–74	Mohawk Valley Comets	NAHL	2				120	8	0	3.99		1	–	–	–	–	–	–	–
1973–74	Cleveland Crusaders	WHA	22	7	12	3	1232	80	1	3.90	.882	–	–	–	–	–	–	–	–
1974–75	Cleveland Crusaders	WHA	29	9	16	1	1654	89	0	3.23	.903	–	–	–	–	–	–	–	–
1975–76	Cleveland Crusaders	WHA	21	7	11	2	1230	70	1	3.41	.892	–	–	–	–	–	–	–	–
1976–77	Mohawk Valley Comets	NAHL	26	8	15	2	1473	117	1	0		.859	–	–	–	–	–	–	–
WHA totals			98	34	51	9	5725	327	2	3.43	.896	–	–	–	–	–	–	–	–
