= List of OHSAA ice hockey champions =

The Ohio High School Athletic Association (OHSAA) is the governing body of athletic programs for junior and senior high schools in the state of Ohio. It conducts state championship competitions in all the OHSAA-sanctioned sports.

== Champions ==
Year	Champion
2026	Gate Mills Gilmour Academy
2025	Upper Arlington
2024	Cleveland St. Ignatius
2023	Olentangy Liberty
2022	Gates Mills Gilmour Academy
2021	Toledo St. Francis de Sales
2020	Tournament canceled
2019	Cleveland St. Ignatius
2018	Cleveland St. Ignatius
2017	Cleveland St. Ignatius
2016	Cleveland St. Ignatius
2015	Toledo St. Francis de Sales
2014	Sylvania Northview & Cleveland St. Ignatius **
2013	Shaker Heights
2012	Sylvania Northview
2011	Toledo St. Francis de Sales
2010	Cleveland St. Ignatius
2009	Hunting Valley University School
2008	Lakewood St. Edward
2007	Toledo St. John's Jesuit
2006	Parma Padua Franciscan
2005	Lakewood St. Edward
2004	Lakewood St. Edward
2003	Hunting Valley University School
2002	Lakewood St. Edward
2001	Shaker Heights
2000	Cleveland St. Ignatius
1999	Bowling Green *
1998	Bowling Green
1997	Bowling Green
1996	Lakewood St. Edward
1995	Lakewood St. Edward
1994	Lakewood St. Edward
1993	Shaker Heights
1992	Lakewood St. Edward
1991	Bowling Green
1990	Lakewood St. Edward
1989	Parma Padua Franciscan
1988	Parma Padua Franciscan
1987	Cleveland Heights
1986	Lakewood St. Edward
1985	Lakewood St. Edward
1984	Bowling Green
1983	Findlay
1982	Kent Roosevelt
1981	Shaker Heights
1980	Bowling Green
1979	Centerville
1978	Findlay

* 1999 Title game was won by St. John's Jesuit High School, but later forfeited due to the use of an ineligible player. It was the first state championship game forfeiture in the history of the OHSAA.
** co-champions - Game called a 1-1 tie after 7 overtimes

== Schools with multiple titles ==
School	Number of Titles	Years
Lakewood St. Edward	11	1985, 1986. 1990, 1992, 1994, 1995, 1996, 2002, 2004, 2005, 2008
Cleveland St. Ignatius	8	2000, 2010, 2014*, 2016, 2017, 2018, 2019, 2024
Bowling Green	6	1980, 1984, 1991, 1997, 1998, 1999
Shaker Heights	4	1981, 1993, 2001, 2013
Parma Padua Franciscan	3	1988, 1989, 2006
Toledo St. Francis de Sales	3	2011, 2015, 2021
Gates Mills Gilmour Academy	2	2022, 2026
Findlay	2	1978, 1983
Hunting Valley University School	2	2003, 2009
Sylvania Northview	2	2012, 2014*

*Shared title

== See also ==
- List of Ohio High School Athletic Association championships
- List of high schools in Ohio
- Ohio High School Athletic Conferences
- Ohio High School Athletic Association
