= Brian Hoyer =

American football player (born 1985)

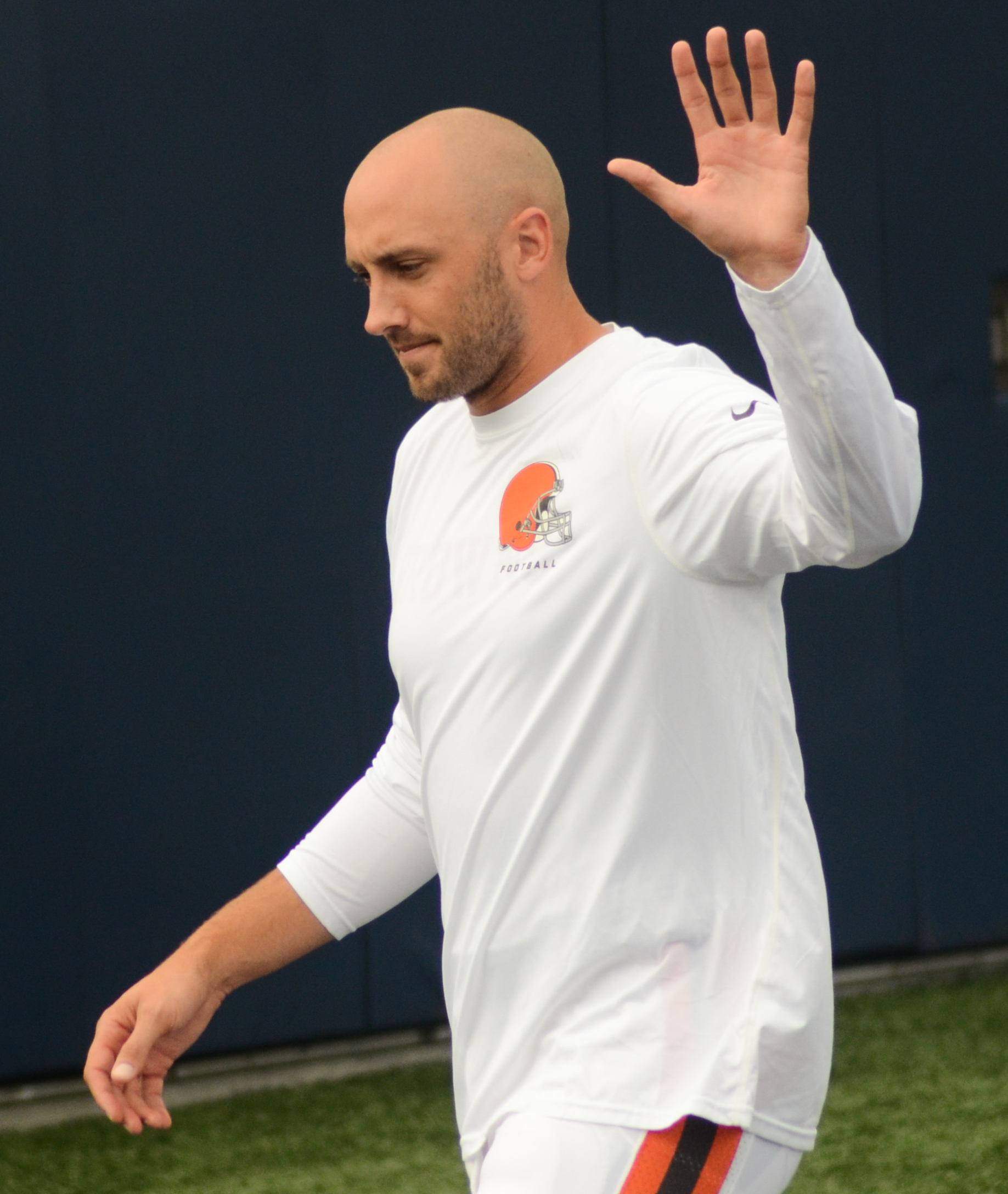
- Hoyer with the Cleveland Browns in 2014

No. 8, 6, 7, 2, 5
- Position: Quarterback

Personal information
- Born: October 13, 1985 (age 41); Lakewood, Ohio, U.S.
- Listed height: 6 ft 2 in (1.88 m)
- Listed weight: 215 lb (98 kg)

Career information
- High school: St. Ignatius (Cleveland, Ohio)
- College: Michigan State (2004–2008)
- NFL draft: 2009: undrafted

Career history
- New England Patriots (2009–2011); Pittsburgh Steelers (2012); Arizona Cardinals (2012); Cleveland Browns (2013–2014); Houston Texans (2015); Chicago Bears (2016); San Francisco 49ers (2017); New England Patriots (2017–2018); Indianapolis Colts (2019); New England Patriots (2020–2022); Las Vegas Raiders (2023)

Awards and highlights
- Super Bowl champion (LIII)

Career NFL statistics
- Passing attempts: 1,560
- Passing completions: 925
- Completion percentage: 59.3%
- TD–INT: 53–37
- Passing yards: 10,899
- Passer rating: 82.0
- Stats at Pro Football Reference

Axel Edward Brian Hoyer (born October 13, 1985) is an American former professional football quarterback who played in the National Football League (NFL) for 15 seasons. During his NFL career from 2009 to 2023, he started for eight different teams, the second-most in league history. Hoyer's longest stint was with the New England Patriots for eight non-consecutive seasons, primarily as a backup, and was a member of the team that won Super Bowl LIII. His most successful season was with the Houston Texans in 2015 when he helped lead them to a division title.

== Early life ==
Born in Lakewood, Ohio, and raised in North Olmsted, Hoyer attended Saint Ignatius High School in Cleveland, Ohio, where he played both football and baseball for the Wildcats. On the varsity baseball team, Hoyer played pitcher, infielder, and outfielder. As a sophomore in 2002, he compiled an 8–1 record with a 1.99 ERA. Hoyer was the winning pitcher in the 2002 Ohio Division I State Championship game allowing two earned runs in six innings pitched.

In football, Hoyer compiled a 16–7 record (.696) as a two-year starter for head coach Chuck Kyle. In 2002, he completed 131-of-263 passes (49.8%) for 2,130 yards, 18 touchdowns, and 12 interceptions. The following year, Hoyer completed 258-of-412 passes for 5,570 yards, 45 touchdowns, and 15 interceptions while leading his team to a 9–3 record. Hoyer was named USA Today Prep Player of the Week for his performance against Shaker Heights High School. Hoyer was an Associated Press Division I all-state selection as a senior. He participated in the 2004 Ohio All-Star Classic and the July 24 Ohio-Pennsylvania Big 33 All-Star Game.

== College career ==
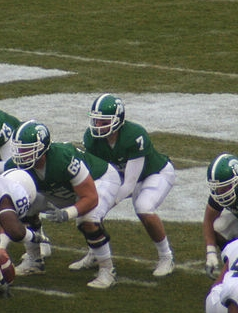
Hoyer (#7) during his tenure at Michigan State

Hoyer was redshirted by Michigan State University in 2004, where he earned Scout Team Offensive Player of the Week honors twice.

In 2005, Hoyer saw action in five games in which he completed 15-of-23 passes (.652) for 167 yards and two touchdowns. In a game against Illinois, he combined with Drew Stanton to throw seven touchdown passes, which tied the Big Ten single-game record.

In 2006, Hoyer played in eight games and completed 82-of-144 passes for 863 yards, four touchdowns, and three interceptions.

In 2007, Hoyer was an honorable mention All-Big Ten selection. He completed 223-of-376 throws (.593) for 2,725 yards, 20 touchdowns, and 11 interceptions in 13 games. Hoyer had six 200-yard passing games.

As a senior in 2008, Hoyer was listed among 26 preseason candidates for the 2008 Johnny Unitas Golden Arm Award, which is presented annually to the nation's top senior quarterback. That year, he played in 13 games and completed 180-of-353 passes (.510) for 2,404 yards, nine touchdowns, and nine interceptions.

== Professional career ==
=== New England Patriots (first stint) ===
==== 2009 season ====
Pre-draft measurables
Height	Weight	Arm length	Hand span	40-yard dash	10-yard split	20-yard split	20-yard shuttle	Three-cone drill	Vertical jump	Broad jump
6 ft 2 in (1.88 m)	215 lb (98 kg)	32 in (0.81 m)	9 1/2 in (0.24 m)	5.05 s	1.73 s	2.90 s	4.42 s	7.10 s	32 in (0.81 m)	9 ft 1 in (2.77 m)
All values from NFL Combine

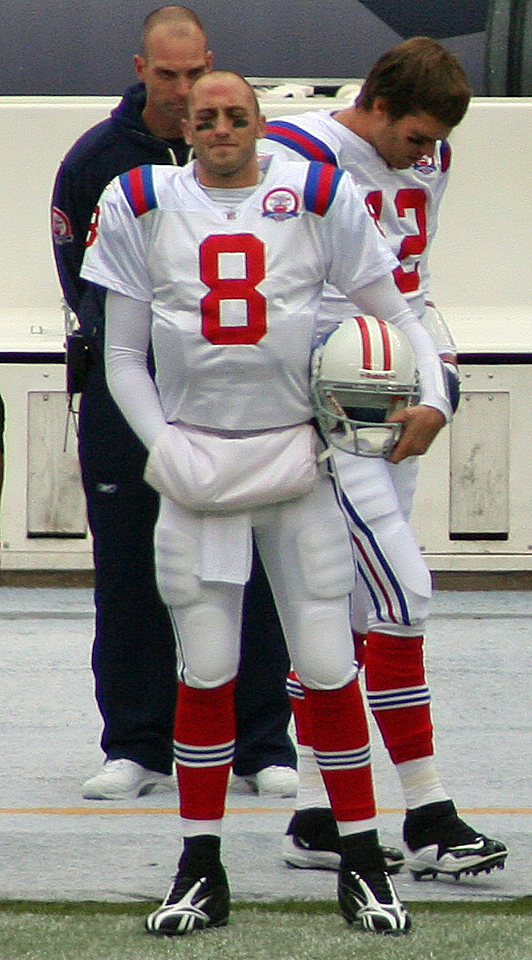
Hoyer and Tom Brady in 2009

Despite being invited to the NFL Scouting Combine, Hoyer was not selected in the 2009 NFL draft. He signed immediately after the draft with the New England Patriots.

Hoyer debuted in the Patriots' preseason game against the Cincinnati Bengals, completing 11-of-19 passes for 112 yards. In the preseason finale against the New York Giants, he played at quarterback the entire game, leading the team on a comeback after trailing 21–0 in the first quarter to a 38–27 victory, completing 18-of-25 passes for 242 yards, a touchdown, and no interceptions.

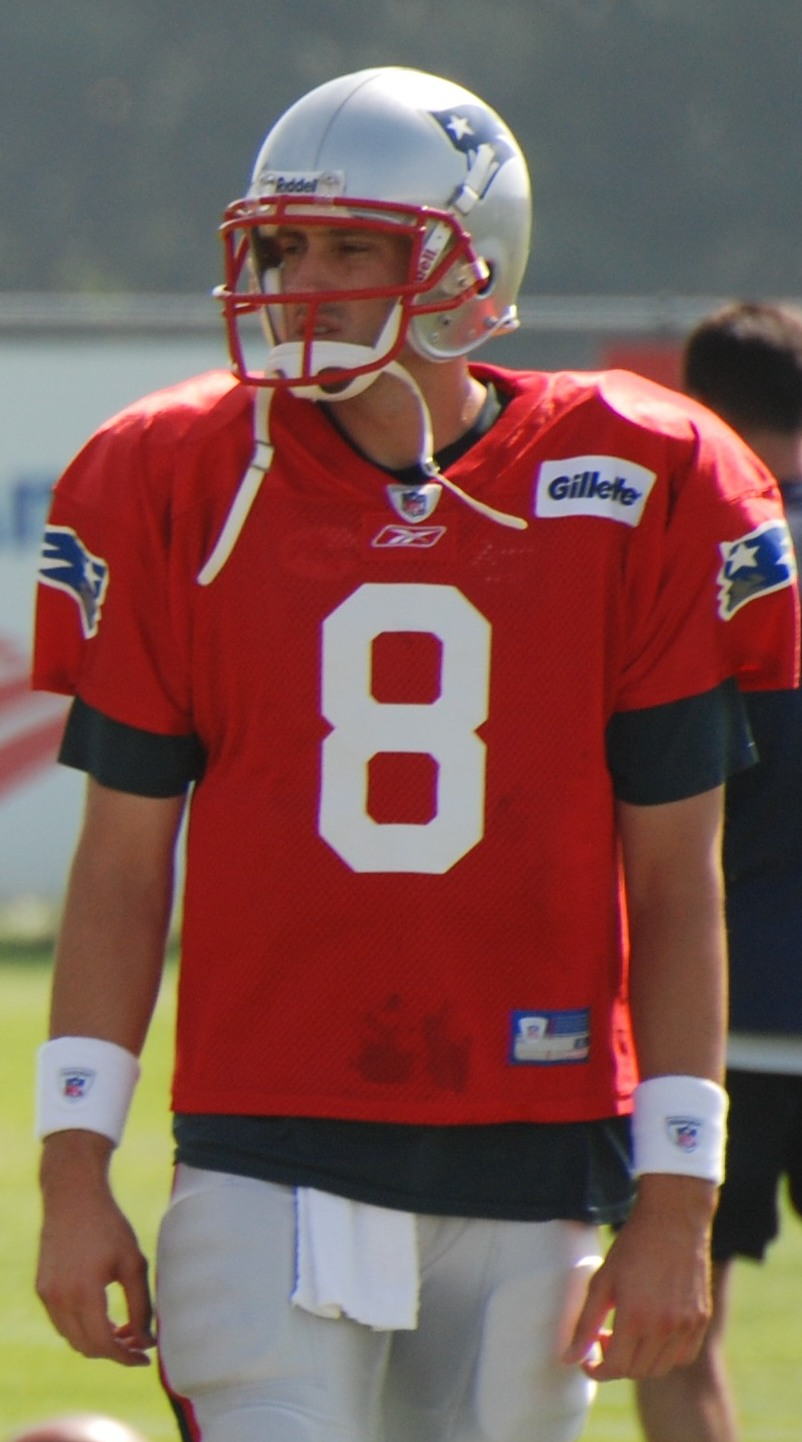
Hoyer in 2009

Hoyer finished the preseason 29–of–44 for 354 yards, including one touchdown, with a 98.1 passer rating. Of the four quarterbacks behind Tom Brady during training camp, the Patriots released Matt Gutierrez, Kevin O'Connell, and Andrew Walter, leaving him as Brady's only backup when the Patriots made their final roster cuts on September 5.

Hoyer made his NFL debut on October 18, in the second half of a game against the Tennessee Titans. On his first drive, Hoyer was 5-for-5 for 35 yards, concluding it with a one-yard rushing touchdown, which set a franchise record for points scored in the Patriots' 59–0 victory. In the regular season finale against the Houston Texans, he appeared in the game and completed eight of 12 passes for 71 yards.

==== 2010 season ====
Hoyer entered the 2010 preseason as Brady's only backup. During the preseason, Hoyer completed 32-of-57 passes for 471 yards, three touchdowns, and one interception.

Hoyer saw his first action of the regular season late in a 34–14 loss to the Cleveland Browns, throwing his first NFL interception. In Week 17, against the Miami Dolphins, he threw a 42-yard touchdown pass to wide receiver Brandon Tate for his first NFL touchdown pass.

==== 2011 season ====
Although the Patriots drafted quarterback Ryan Mallett in the draft over the summer, Hoyer retained his role as Brady's primary backup.

Hoyer saw only limited action during the 2011 season; his only pass attempt was the Patriots' final attempt of the 2011 regular season. The pass, which head coach Bill Belichick asked offensive coordinator Bill O'Brien to call, was a 22-yard pass to tight end Rob Gronkowski to give Gronkowski the NFL record for receiving yards in a season by a tight end. In the playoffs, the Patriots defeated the Denver Broncos in the Divisional Round and the Baltimore Ravens in the AFC Championship Game to reach Super Bowl XLVI. The Patriots went on to lose 21–17 to the Giants.

On August 31, 2012, Hoyer was released by the Patriots during final cuts. He practiced with Saint Ignatius players while hoping for another team to sign him.

=== Pittsburgh Steelers ===
On November 20, 2012, Hoyer signed with the Pittsburgh Steelers after injuries to starting quarterback Ben Roethlisberger and backup Byron Leftwich within a week of each other. He served as the backup to Charlie Batch in Weeks 12 and 13 against the Browns and Ravens respectively. Hoyer was released on December 8. The Steelers are Hoyer's only NFL team that he did not start for.

=== Arizona Cardinals ===
Hoyer was claimed off waivers by the Arizona Cardinals on December 10, 2012. He replaced Ryan Lindley in Week 16 against the Chicago Bears and completed 11-of-19 passes for 105 yards and an interception. On December 26, Cardinals head coach Ken Whisenhunt announced that Hoyer would start in the season finale against the San Francisco 49ers, making him the fourth starting quarterback for the Cardinals that season. Hoyer finished the 27–13 loss completing 19-of-34 passes for 225 yards, a touchdown, and an interception.

On May 12, 2013, Hoyer was released.

=== Cleveland Browns ===
==== 2013 season ====
On May 16, 2013, Hoyer was signed by the Browns to a two-year deal.

On September 18, in relief of then-starter Brandon Weeden, who was out with a thumb injury, the Browns skipped over second string Jason Campbell and named Hoyer the starting quarterback for the Week 3 matchup against the Minnesota Vikings. He threw for 321 yards, three touchdowns, and three interceptions in the team's first win of the season. It was announced later in the week that Hoyer would be the starter for Week 4 against division rival Bengals as Weeden remained out with a thumb injury. Hoyer led the Browns to another win, completing 25-of-38 passes for 269 yards and two touchdowns, along with throwing no interceptions in the 17–6 victory. The next day, Hoyer was named the starter for a third straight game, Thursday Night Football vs the Buffalo Bills. Despite being named starter for three straight games, Hoyer was not declared the official starter for the rest of the 2013 season by head coach Rob Chudzinski, who referred to the situation as "a week-to-week thing." He later added that, if Hoyer continued to exceed expectations, he would maintain his starting position. However, Hoyer sustained an ACL tear in the Thursday Night game against the Bills, prematurely ending his season.

==== 2014 season ====
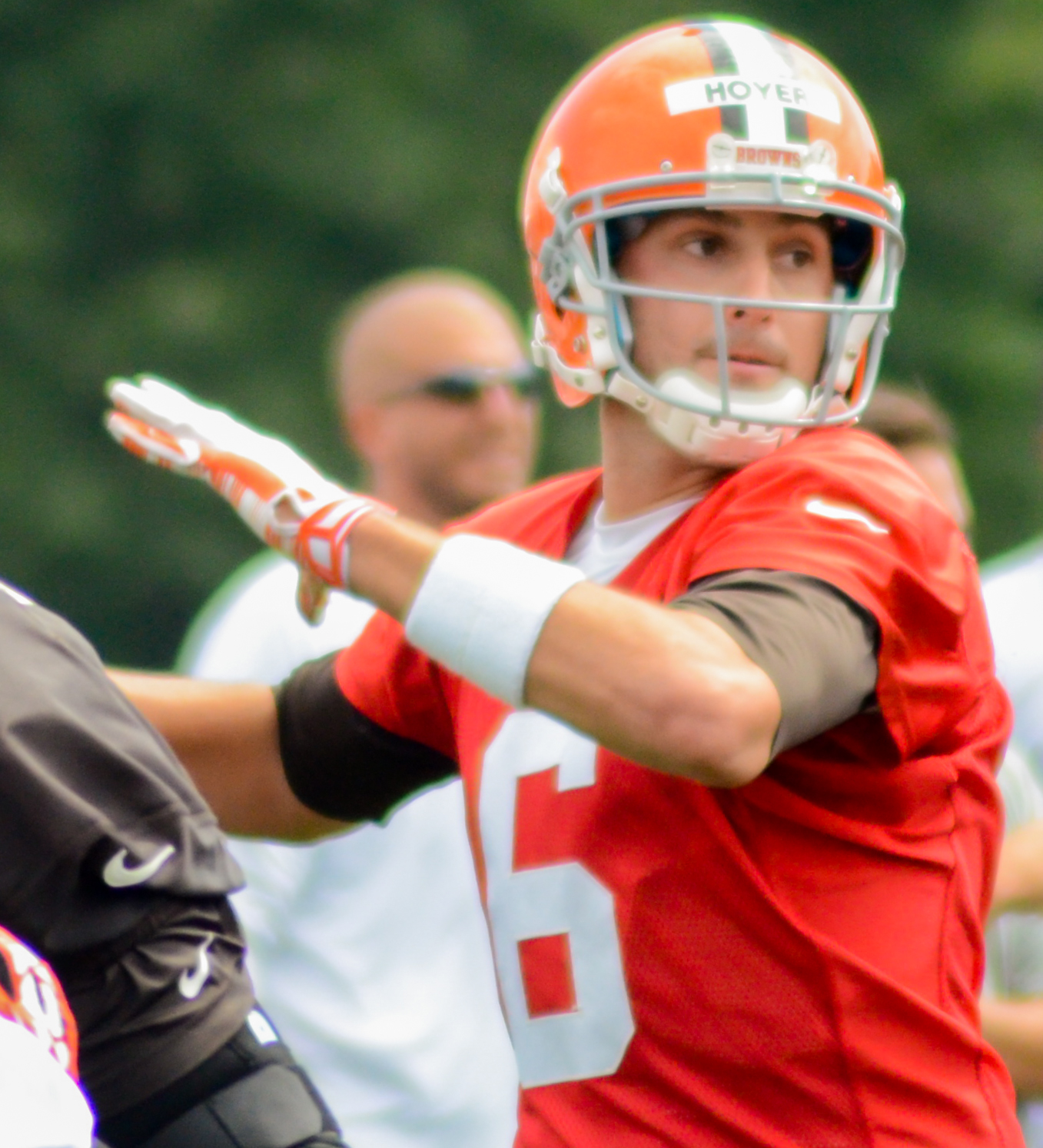
Hoyer in 2014

With the Browns' releases of Weeden and Campbell to free agency, Hoyer stated that he was confident that he would be the starting quarterback for the Browns, no matter who they would draft in 2014. The Browns drafted Heisman Trophy winning quarterback Johnny Manziel with the 22nd overall pick, who was known as one of the top quarterback prospects in the 2014 NFL draft. Hoyer did not take this as too much of a shock, stating "I don't want people to think I'm sitting at home pouting." Head coach Mike Pettine stated that Manziel would not simply be handed the job, leaving the starter position open to competition.

On August 20, 2014, Hoyer was tabbed the starting quarterback for the Browns to begin the 2014 season. Through the first six weeks the Browns were 3–2, with the two losses coming on last-second scores, and Hoyer possessing a 7–1 TD:INT ratio. During Week 5 against the Titans, Hoyer threw for 292 yards, 3 touchdowns, and an interception. Despite trailing 28–3, Hoyer led the Browns to 26 unanswered points, securing the win with a final score of 29–28. It was the largest comeback victory in franchise history, and the largest for a road team in NFL history. Hoyer led the Browns to a 6–3 start, the franchise's best nine-game start since the team started 7–2 in the 1994 season. However, Hoyer struggled in the following four games, throwing only one touchdown while being intercepted eight times. As a result, the Browns lost three of those four games to fall to 7–6 on the season, jeopardizing their playoff hopes. During a Week 14 home loss to the Indianapolis Colts, Hoyer was 14/31 for 140 yards and two interceptions. He was repeatedly booed by fans throughout the game and was heavily criticized for his performance following the loss. Through 13 games on the season, Hoyer had 11 touchdowns to 12 interceptions. His struggles in this 1–3 stretch led many fans, pundits, and analysts to call for the quarterback to be benched in favor of rookie Johnny Manziel. On December 9, 2014, the Browns announced that Manziel would start in Week 15 against the Bengals in place of Hoyer. The following week, Manziel was injured in the second quarter of the Browns' matchup against the Carolina Panthers and was relieved by Hoyer. Hoyer threw a touchdown and an interception while going 7/13 with 153 passing yards. In the fourth quarter, he threw an 81-yard touchdown pass to tight end Jordan Cameron to put the Browns up 13–10. However, the Panthers regained the lead on the next drive and went on to win the game 17–13. Hoyer's 13.7 yards per completion was the highest in the NFL in 2014. After the season, his contract expired and he became a free agent.

=== Houston Texans ===
On March 11, 2015, Hoyer signed a two-year, $10.5 million contract with the Houston Texans. On August 24, he was named the starter for the regular season over former Patriots teammate Ryan Mallett.

In the first game of the season, with Houston trailing to the Kansas City Chiefs 27–9, Hoyer was benched in the fourth quarter in favor of Mallett. On September 17, head coach Bill O'Brien announced that Hoyer would be benched in favor of Mallett for the second game of the season against the Panthers. In Week 5, during a matchup against the Colts, Mallett was injured and was replaced by Hoyer for the remainder of the game. Hoyer threw for two touchdowns but also threw a costly interception to give the Colts a 27–20 victory. Hoyer was then announced as the starter for the next game against the Jacksonville Jaguars. Hoyer led the Texans to a 31–20 victory over the Jaguars and was announced by O'Brien as the starter going forward. On January 3, 2016, Hoyer led the Texans to their first playoff berth and AFC South title since 2012 with a 30–6 victory over the Jaguars.

During the Wild Card Round against the Kansas City Chiefs, Hoyer struggled, throwing for 136 yards and four interceptions during the 30–0 shutout loss.

Hoyer was released on April 17, 2016.

=== Chicago Bears ===
On April 30, 2016, Hoyer agreed to a one-year, $2 million contract with the Chicago Bears.

After an injury to starting quarterback Jay Cutler in Week 2, he started in the Week 3 game against the Dallas Cowboys and threw for 317 yards and two touchdowns in a 31–17 loss. The following week, he threw two touchdowns for 302 yards in a 17–14 victory over the Detroit Lions. A week later in a 29–23 loss to the Colts, he threw for a career-high 397 yards, the most by a Bears quarterback since Jim Miller threw for 422 yards in 1999 and the fifth-most in Bears history. Hoyer also joined Josh McCown as the only Bears quarterbacks to throw for at least 300 yards in three straight games and later became the first to do so in four consecutive games after throwing for 302 yards in a loss to the Jaguars. Hoyer broke his left arm during the second quarter of a game against the Green Bay Packers on October 20, 2016. He was placed on injured reserve on October 24, after having surgery on his left arm, and was reported to be out at least eight weeks. Hoyer is tied for the most 300-yard passing games by a Bears quarterback in a single season with 4, alongside Cutler, Mitchell Trubisky, Caleb Williams and Billy Wade.

=== San Francisco 49ers ===
On March 9, 2017, Hoyer signed a two-year contract with the San Francisco 49ers. Hoyer started the first six games of the season for the 49ers. Through the first five games, Hoyer had completed 59 percent of his passes for four touchdowns and four interceptions as the 49ers lost all five games. During Hoyer's sixth start in Week 6 against the Washington Redskins, he was benched in favor of rookie C. J. Beathard during the second quarter after completing 4 of 11 passes for 34 yards. After the game, Beathard was named the 49ers starter.

On October 30, 2017, Hoyer was released by the 49ers following the acquisition of Jimmy Garoppolo in a trade with the Patriots. It was also reported that Hoyer was originally part of the trade, but the Patriots did not want him included due to compensatory draft pick reasons.

=== New England Patriots (second stint) ===
==== 2017 season ====
On November 1, 2017, Hoyer signed a three-year contract to return to the Patriots to be the backup to Tom Brady, with whom he started his career. On November 12, Hoyer was brought in to end the game after the Patriots led the Denver Broncos by more than 20 points. He completed all three of his pass attempts for 37 yards as the Patriots won 41–16. In the regular season finale, Hoyer was brought in to end the game after the Patriots led the New York Jets by 20 points. He completed one of three passes for five yards as the Patriots won 26–6. On January 13, 2018, he appeared late in the Patriots' 35–14 victory over the Titans to kneel down in the victory formation in the Divisional Round. It was his second appearance in a playoff game.

==== 2018 season ====
In the 2018 season, Hoyer played in five games in relief of Brady. He was active for the Patriots' Super Bowl LIII victory over the Los Angeles Rams, but was the only active Patriot not to play a down. Due to his experience of playing under the offense system run by Rams head coach Sean McVay, Hoyer played a key role in preparing the Patriots' defense, which held the Rams offense to only one field goal.

On August 31, 2019, Hoyer was released by the Patriots after losing the backup job to rookie Jarrett Stidham.

=== Indianapolis Colts ===
On September 2, 2019, Hoyer signed a three-year, $12 million contract with the Indianapolis Colts.

Hoyer came into the game on November 3 in place of an injured Jacoby Brissett and threw for 168 yards, three touchdowns, and an interception in the narrow 26–24 loss against the Steelers. In the loss, Adam Vinatieri missed a late field goal which would have won the game. Hoyer made his first start with the Colts the following week against Dolphins. Hoyer threw for 204 yards, a touchdown, and three interceptions. One of the interceptions occurred when a Dolphins defender stripped a Colts receiver of the football in the endzone before the receiver could secure possession of the football. The result was a 16–12 Colts loss.

On March 21, 2020, Hoyer was released.

=== New England Patriots (third stint) ===
==== 2020 season ====
On March 25, 2020, Hoyer signed a one-year contract with the Patriots. He beat out Jarrett Stidham to serve as the second-string quarterback behind the newly-signed Cam Newton.

After Newton tested positive for COVID-19 prior to a Week 4 matchup against the Chiefs, Hoyer became the Patriots' starter for the first time in his career. Hoyer struggled during the game, committing two red zone miscues that stopped the Patriots from scoring – a sack preventing New England from running another play before the first half ended and a fumble recovered by the Chiefs. Following the fumble, he was replaced by Stidham for the remainder of the game, which the Patriots lost 26–10. Hoyer was subsequently demoted to third-string behind Stidham and did not take the field for the remainder of the season.

==== 2021 season ====
Hoyer re-signed with the Patriots on a one-year contract on May 18, 2021. On August 31, he was released from the Patriots during final roster cuts, but signed with the practice squad the following day. Hoyer was promoted to the active roster on September 18 as the second-string quarterback behind rookie Mac Jones and ahead of Stidham.

During a Week 7 rout of the Jets, Hoyer made his season debut when he relieved Jones in the fourth quarter. Hoyer completed three of four passes for 79 yards on a drive that extended the Patriots' lead to 54–13 and took the victory formation to seal the victory. Hoyer again relieved Jones in the fourth quarter of the Week 10 matchup with the Browns after the Patriots took a 38–7 lead. Hoyer threw a touchdown pass to wide receiver Jakobi Meyers to conclude the 45–7 victory, which was his first since 2019 and the first of Meyers' career. Hoyer made his third relief appearance during Week 17 against the Jaguars, throwing for 63 yards in the fourth quarter and completing the 50–10 rout by taking the victory formation.

==== 2022 season ====
On March 14, 2022, Hoyer signed a two-year contract extension with the Patriots. He was named the second-string quarterback behind Jones and ahead of rookie Bailey Zappe. Hoyer started the Week 4 matchup with the Packers after Jones was injured the previous week, but suffered a concussion during his first drive and was replaced by Zappe in the 27–24 loss. He was placed on injured reserve on October 6.

Hoyer was released on March 16, 2023.

=== Las Vegas Raiders ===
On April 4, 2023, Hoyer signed with the Las Vegas Raiders. During Week 6 against the Patriots, Hoyer came in relief of Jimmy Garoppolo, who left the game with a back injury. Hoyer finished with 102 passing yards as the Raiders won 21–17. In Week 7, Hoyer was selected to start his first game for the Raiders against the Bears over newly-acquired fourth round quarterback Aidan O'Connell. Hoyer struggled in the 30–6 loss as he completed 17 of 32 passes for 129 yards and two interceptions, one of which was returned for a touchdown.

On March 13, 2024, Hoyer was released.

== Post-NFL career ==
In August 2024, Hoyer became an analyst for Patriots preseason games. In 2025, he and former teammate David Andrews partnered with NBC Sports Boston to start a football podcast that debuted in September. Since at least 2026, Hoyer has been the offensive coordinator for the freshman football team at Xaverian Brothers High School.

== Career statistics ==
Legend
	Won the Super Bowl
**Bold**	Career high

=== NFL ===
==== Regular season ====
Year	Team	Games			Passing									Rushing					Sacks		Fumbles	
Year	Team	GP	GS	Record	Cmp	Att	Pct	Yds	Avg	Lng	TD	Int	Rtg	Att	Yds	Avg	Lng	TD	Sck	Yds	Fum	Lost
2009	NE	5	0	—	19	27	70.4	142	5.3	17	0	0	82.6	10	25	2.5	**20**	**1**	2	18	0	0
2010	NE	5	0	—	7	15	46.7	122	8.1	42	1	1	69.3	10	−8	−0.8	1	0	0	0	0	0
2011	NE	3	0	—	1	1	**100.0**	22	**22.0**	22	0	0	118.7	4	−3	−0.8	0	0	0	0	0	0
2012	ARI	2	1	0–1	30	53	56.6	330	6.2	53	1	2	65.8	1	6	6.0	6	0	4	30	1	0
2013	CLE	3	3	3–0	57	96	59.4	615	6.4	47	5	3	82.6	6	16	2.7	11	0	6	48	0	0
2014	CLE	14	13	**7–6**	**242**	**438**	55.3	**3,326**	7.6	**81**	12	**13**	76.5	**24**	39	1.6	11	0	24	160	4	1
2015	HOU	11	9	5–4	224	369	60.7	2,606	7.1	49	**19**	7	91.4	15	**44**	2.9	15	0	**25**	**185**	**6**	**2**
2016	CHI	6	5	1–4	134	200	67.0	1,445	7.2	64	6	0	98.0	7	−2	−0.3	3	0	4	18	3	1
2017	SF	6	6	0–6	119	205	58.0	1,245	6.1	59	4	4	74.1	5	7	1.4	9	**1**	16	112	3	1
2017	NE	5	0	—	4	6	66.7	42	7.0	27	0	0	86.8	4	−3	−0.8	0	0	0	0	0	0
2018	NE	5	0	—	1	2	50.0	7	3.5	7	0	0	58.3	11	−8	−0.7	2	0	0	0	0	0
2019	IND	4	1	0–1	35	65	53.8	372	5.7	23	4	4	65.7	8	2	0.3	6	0	5	47	2	1
2020	NE	1	1	0–1	15	24	62.5	130	5.4	25	0	1	59.4	1	8	**8.0**	8	0	2	18	1	1
2021	NE	5	0	—	9	11	81.8	227	20.6	48	1	0	**149.1**	11	−8	−0.7	2	0	0	0	0	0
2022	NE	1	1	0–1	5	6	83.3	37	6.2	27	0	0	92.4	0	0	0.0	0	0	1	8	0	0
2023	LV	3	1	0–1	23	42	54.8	231	5.5	48	0	2	50.8	3	−3	−1.0	−1	0	1	8	0	0
Career		79	41	16–25	925	1,560	59.3	10,899	7.0	81	53	37	82.0	120	112	0.9	20	2	90	652	20	7

==== Postseason ====
Year	Team	Games			Passing									Rushing					Sacks		Fumbles	
Year	Team	GP	GS	Record	Cmp	Att	Pct	Yds	Avg	Lng	TD	Int	Rtg	Att	Yds	Avg	Lng	TD	Sck	Yds	Fum	Lost
2009	NE	0	0	—	DNP																	
2010	NE	0	0	—	DNP																	
2011	NE	0	0	—	DNP																	
2015	HOU	1	1	0–1	**15**	**34**	**44.1**	**136**	**4.0**	**17**	0	**4**	**15.9**	1	−1	−1.0	−1	0	**3**	**24**	**2**	**1**
2017	NE	1	0	—	0	0	0.0	0	0.0	0	0	0	0.0	**3**	−1	−0.3	0	0	0	0	0	0
2018	NE	0	0	—	DNP																	
2021	NE	0	0	—	DNP																	
Career		2	1	0–1	15	34	44.1	136	4.0	17	0	4	15.9	4	−2	−0.5	0	0	3	24	2	1

=== College ===
Year	Team	GP	Passing								Rushing			
Year	Team	GP	Cmp	Att	Pct	Yds	Y/A	TD	Int	Rtg	Att	Yds	Avg	TD
2004	Michigan State	Redshirt												
2005	Michigan State	5	15	23	**65.2**	167	**7.3**	2	0	**154.9**	2	**6**	**3.0**	0
2006	Michigan State	8	82	144	56.9	863	6.0	4	3	112.3	13	−36	−2.8	0
2007	Michigan State	13	**223**	**376**	59.3	**2,725**	7.2	**20**	**11**	131.9	**47**	−105	−2.2	**1**
2008	Michigan State	13	180	353	51.0	2,404	6.8	9	9	111.5	44	−70	−1.6	**1**
Career		39	500	896	55.8	6,159	6.9	35	23	121.3	106	-205	-1.9	2

== Personal life ==
Hoyer is of German descent through his father and holds dual German and American citizenship. He is married to Lauren Scrivens. They have two children, Garrett and Cameron.
