= Saltwater soap =

Soap for use with seawater

Saltwater soap, also called sailors' soap, is a potassium-based soap for use with seawater. Inexpensive common commercial soap will not lather or dissolve in seawater due to high levels of sodium chloride in the water. Similarly, common soap does not work as well as potassium-based soap in hard water where calcium replaces the sodium, making residual insoluble "scum" due to the insolubility of the soap residue. To be an effective cleaning agent, soap must be able to dissolve in water.

Ordinary soap is a salt of a fatty acid. Soaps are mainly used as surfactants for washing, bathing, and cleaning. Soaps for cleansing are made by treating vegetable or animal oils and fats with a strongly alkaline solution. Fats and oils are composed of triglycerides; three molecules of fatty acids are attached to a single molecule of glycerol. The alkaline solution, which is often called lye (although the term "lye soap" refers almost exclusively to soaps made with sodium hydroxide), brings about a chemical reaction known as saponification. In this reaction, the triglyceride fats are first hydrolyzed into free fatty acids, and then these combine with the alkali to form crude soap: a combination of various soap salts, excess fat or alkali, water, and liberated glycerol (glycerin).

Saltwater soaps are potassium salts rather than sodium salts. Both sodium and potassium are alkali metals. The relatively high concentration of salt (sodium chloride) in seawater lowers the solubility of soaps made with sodium hydroxide, due to the common ion effect, a form of salting out. Potassium soaps are more soluble in seawater than sodium soaps and so are more effective with seawater. In places that do not have freshwater or need to conserve it, cleaning can be done with the use of salt water and saltwater soap.

== See also ==
- Elephant toothpaste
- Evaporator (marine)
- Feldspar
- Lithium soap
- Murphy Oil Soap
- Navy shower
- Potassium carbonate
- Potassium hydroxide
- Saponification value
