= Murlan J. Murphy =

American businessman (born 1918)

Murlan Jeremiah "Jerry" Murphy Jr. (1918–2009) was an American Businessman who ran several chemical-related companies in Cleveland, Ohio. "Murlan," which is his first name, combined his grandparents' surnames which is Murphy and Whelan. His middle name, "Jeremiah," comes from grandfather Jeremiah T. Murphy, who started Phoenix Oil Co. in the Flats in 1890. In 1905, Murphy turned a German recipe into Murphy Oil Soap. Chief among the companies was Murphy-Phoenix Company, makers of Murphy Oil Soap, which was later sold to Colgate-Palmolive.

== Early life ==
Murphy was born on June 27, 1918, in Cleveland Heights, a suburb of Cleveland, Ohio. He was named after his father, whose unusual first name was the combination of his parents' (Jerry's grandparent's) surnames of Murphy and Whelan, while his middle name came from grandfather Jeremiah T. Murphy. He also had a brother, Lawrence, and a sister, Rita Jane.

He graduated from St. Ignatius High School in Cleveland in 1936. He later graduated from Case Institute of Technology with a bachelor's degree in chemical engineering. He was a brother in the Sigma Nu fraternity.

== Career ==
Murphy Oil Soap was first marketed in 1910 (approx.) by Mr. Murphy's father, who was also Murlan J. Murphy and was president of the Murphy-Phoenix Company, which was founded in 1890 by Mr. Murphy's grandfather, Jeremiah T. Murphy. The original business of Murphy-Phoenix was Industrial Specialty Chemicals, especially lubricants.

In the early 1970s, Mr. Murphy was joined in the business by his five children, who together managed the growth of Murphy's Oil Soap into a leading consumer brand. In 1991, the Murphy-Phoenix Company was acquired by Colgate Palmolive Company. Subsequent to this transaction, two businesses were formed to continue the industrial chemical product lines. These are JTM Products, Solon, Ohio, and CheMasters, Madison, Ohio. Both companies are owned by members of the Murphy family.

Mr. Murphy was a generous supporter of many not for profit institutions, primarily in the Cleveland, Ohio area. Foremost among these is his alma mater, St. Ignatius High School, where he donated a gymnasium, a chapel, and a science building, and added to the endowment.

Mr. Murphy and his wife, Margaret (née Scanlan, of Lorain, Ohio) had five children, seventeen grandchildren, and (as of 1/14/08) four great-grandchildren.

At age 90, Murphy died on April 18, 2009, at Hospice of the Western Reserve in Cleveland, Ohio.
