= Navy shower =

Showering technique that saves water and time

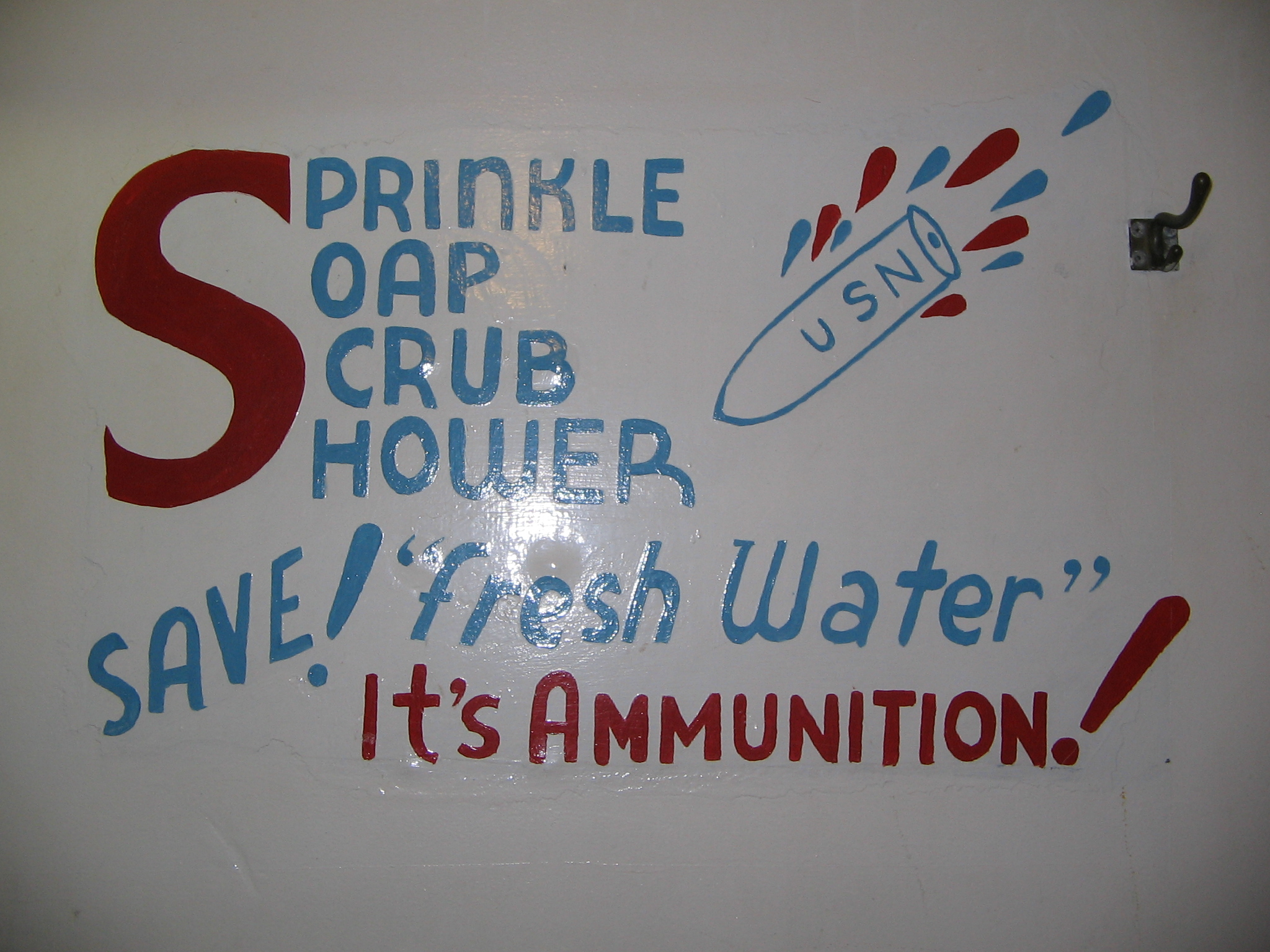
Slogan painted on the wall of a bathroom on the USS Alabama describing a navy shower

A Navy shower (also known as a "combat shower", "military shower", "sea shower", "staggered shower", or "G.I. bath") is a method of showering that allows for significant conservation of water and energy by turning off the flow of water in the middle portion of the shower while lathering. The total running time of this kind of shower can last less than two minutes – using an initial thirty seconds or so to get wet, followed by shutting off the water, using soap and shampoo and lathering, then rinsing for a minute or less.

Navy showers originated on naval ships, where supplies of fresh water were often scarce. Using this method, crew members were able to stay clean, while conserving their limited water supply. The concept has also been adopted by some other people who wish to conserve water and the energy needed to heat the water, for both environmental and economic reasons. According to the U.S. Department of Energy, water heating is typically the second-largest energy expense in homes (after space heating).

Maritime cruisers often take navy showers when they are not in a port with easy access to fresh water. A ten-minute shower takes as much as 230 liters (60 U.S. gal) of water, while a navy shower usually takes as little as 11 liters (3 U.S. gal); one person can save up to 56,000 liters (15,000 U.S. gal) per year.

In United States Navy parlance, the term "Hollywood shower" contrasts with a Navy shower, referring to a long shower with very high water usage.

== See also ==
- Saltwater soap, also called sailors' soap
