= Potassium hydroxide =

Inorganic compound (KOH)

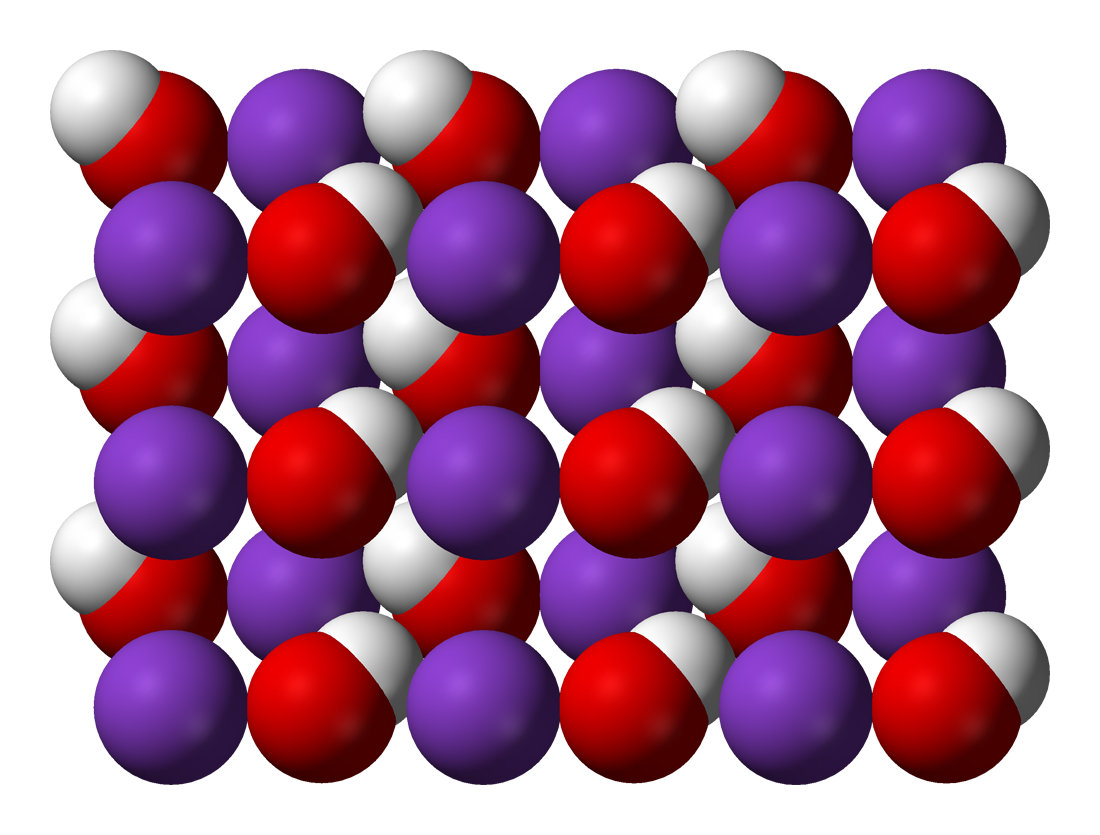
- Crystal structure of KOH

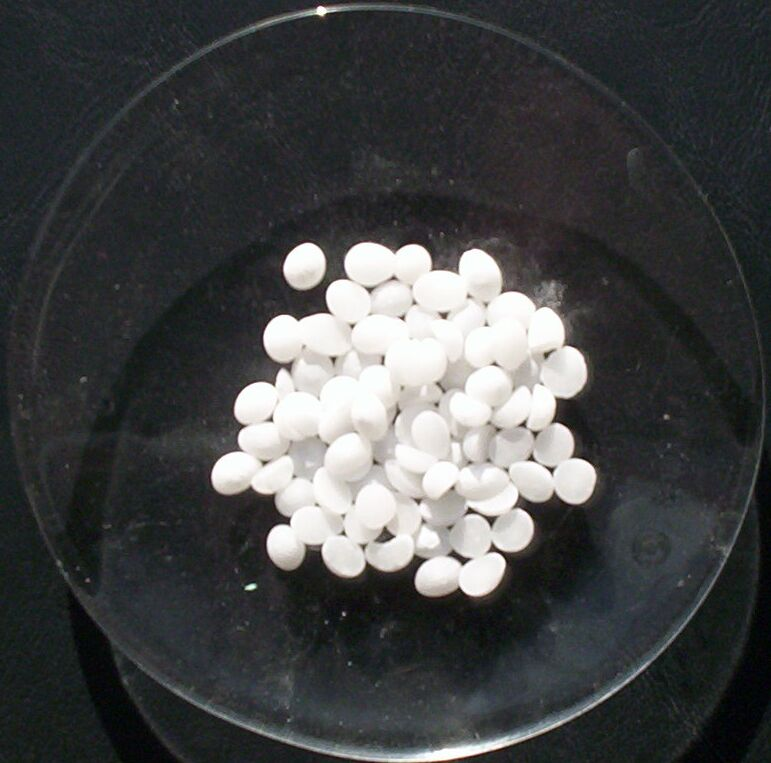
- Pellets of potassium hydroxide

Names
- IUPAC name Potassium hydroxide
- Other names: Caustic potash; Lye; Potash lye; Potassia; Potassium hydrate; KOH

Identifiers
CAS Number	1310-58-3
3D model (JSmol)	Interactive image
ChEBI	CHEBI:32035
ChemSpider	14113
ECHA InfoCard	100.013.802
EC Number	215-181-3
E number	E525 (acidity regulators, ...)
PubChem CID	14797
RTECS number	TT2100000
UNII	WZH3C48M4T
UN number	1813
CompTox Dashboard (EPA)	DTXSID5029633
- InChI: InChI=1S/K.H2O/h;1H2/q+1;/p-1 Key: KWYUFKZDYYNOTN-UHFFFAOYSA-M; InChI=1/K.H2O/h;1H2/q+1;/p-1 Key: KWYUFKZDYYNOTN-REWHXWOFAT
- SMILES: [K+].[OH-]

Properties
Chemical formula	KOH
Molar mass	56.105 g·mol^{−1}
Appearance	white solid, deliquescent
Odor	odorless
Density	2.044 g/cm^{3} (20 °C); 2.12 g/cm^{3} (25 °C)
Melting point	410 °C (770 °F; 683 K)
Boiling point	1,327 °C (2,421 °F; 1,600 K)
Solubility in water	85 g/100 mL (−23.2 °C); 97 g/100 mL (0 °C); 121 g/100 mL (25 °C); 138.3 g/100 mL (50 °C); 162.9 g/100 mL (100 °C)
Solubility	soluble in alcohol, glycerol insoluble in ether, liquid ammonia
Solubility in methanol	55 g/100 g (28 °C)
Solubility in isopropanol	~14 g / 100 g (28 °C)
Acidity (pK_{a})	14.7
Magnetic susceptibility (χ)	−22.0·10^{−6} cm^{3}/mol
Refractive index (n_{D})	1.409 (20 °C)

Thermochemistry
Heat capacity (C)	65.87 J/mol·K
Std molar entropy (S^{⦵}_{298})	79.32 J/mol·K
Std enthalpy of formation (Δ_{f}H^{⦵}_{298})	−425.8 kJ/mol
Gibbs free energy (Δ_{f}G^{⦵})	−380.2 kJ/mol

Hazards
- GHS labelling
Pictograms	(GHS05: Corrosive) (GHS07: Exclamation mark)
Signal word	Danger
Hazard statements	H290, H302, H314
Precautionary statements	P280, P305+P351+P338, P310
NFPA 704 (fire diamond)	3 0 1 ALK
Flash point	nonflammable
- Lethal dose or concentration (LD, LC)
LD_{50} (median dose)	273 mg/kg (oral, rat)
- NIOSH (US health exposure limits)
PEL (Permissible)	none
REL (Recommended)	C 2 mg/m^{3}
IDLH (Immediate danger)	N.D.
Safety data sheet (SDS)	ICSC 0357

Related compounds
Other anions	Potassium hydrosulfide Potassium amide
Other cations	Lithium hydroxide Sodium hydroxide Rubidium hydroxide Caesium hydroxide
Related compounds	Potassium oxide
- Except where otherwise noted, data are given for materials in their standard state (at 25 °C [77 °F], 100 kPa). verify (what is ?) Infobox references

Potassium hydroxide is an inorganic compound with the formula KOH, and is commonly called caustic potash.

Along with sodium hydroxide (NaOH), KOH is a prototypical strong base. It has many industrial and niche applications, most of which utilize its caustic nature and its reactivity toward acids. About 2.5 million tonnes were produced in 2023. KOH is noteworthy as the precursor to most soft and liquid soaps, as well as numerous potassium-containing chemicals. It is a white solid that is dangerously corrosive.

== Properties and structure ==
KOH exhibits high thermal stability. Because of this high stability and relatively low melting point, it is often melt-cast as pellets or rods, forms that have low surface area and convenient handling properties. These pellets become tacky in air because KOH is hygroscopic. Most commercial samples are ca. 90% pure, the remainder being water and carbonates. Its dissolution in water is strongly exothermic. Concentrated aqueous solutions are sometimes called potassium lyes. Even at high temperatures, solid KOH does not dehydrate readily.

=== Structure ===
At higher temperatures, solid KOH crystallizes in the NaCl crystal structure. The OH^{−} group is either rapidly or randomly disordered so that it is effectively a spherical anion of radius 1.53 Å (between Cl^{−} and F^{−} in size). At room temperature, the OH^{−} groups are ordered and the environment about the K^{+} centers is distorted, with K^{+}−OH^{−} distances ranging from 2.69 to 3.15 Å, depending on the orientation of the OH group. KOH forms a series of crystalline hydrates, namely the monohydrate KOH · H_{2}O, the dihydrate KOH · 2H_{2}O and the tetrahydrate KOH · 4H_{2}O.

== Reactions ==
=== Solubility and desiccating properties ===
About 112 g of KOH dissolve in 100 mL water at room temperature, which contrasts with 100 g/100 mL for NaOH. Thus, KOH is slightly more soluble than NaOH. However, it is slightly less soluble on a molar basis due to its higher molar mass. Lower molecular-weight alcohols such as methanol, ethanol, and propanols are also excellent solvents. They participate in an acid-base equilibrium. In the case of methanol the potassium methoxide (methylate) forms:

KOH + CH_{3}OH → CH_{3}OK + H_{2}O

Because of its high affinity for water, KOH serves as a desiccant in the laboratory. It is often used to dry basic solvents, especially amines and pyridines.

=== As a nucleophile in organic chemistry ===
KOH, like NaOH, serves as a source of OH^{−}, a highly nucleophilic anion that attacks polar bonds in both inorganic and organic materials. Aqueous KOH saponifies esters:

KOH + RCOOR' → RCOOK + R'OH

When R is a long chain, the product is called a potassium soap. This reaction is manifested by the "greasy" feel that KOH gives when touched; fats on the skin are rapidly converted to soap and glycerol.

Molten KOH is used to displace halides and other leaving groups. The reaction is especially useful for aromatic reagents to give the corresponding phenols.

=== Reactions with inorganic compounds ===
Complementary to its reactivity toward acids, KOH attacks oxides. Thus, SiO_{2} is attacked by KOH to give soluble potassium silicates. KOH reacts with carbon dioxide to give potassium bicarbonate:

KOH + CO_{2} → KHCO_{3}

== Manufacture ==
Historically, KOH was made by adding potassium carbonate to a strong solution of calcium hydroxide (slaked lime). The salt metathesis reaction results in precipitation of solid calcium carbonate, leaving potassium hydroxide in solution:

Ca(OH)_{2} + K_{2}CO_{3} → CaCO_{3} + 2 KOH

Filtering off the precipitated calcium carbonate and boiling down the solution gives potassium hydroxide ("calcinated or caustic potash"). This method of producing potassium hydroxide remained dominant until the late 19th century, when it was largely replaced by the current method of electrolysis of potassium chloride solutions. The method is analogous to the manufacture of sodium hydroxide (see chloralkali process):

2 KCl + 2 H_{2}O → 2 KOH + Cl_{2} + H_{2}

Hydrogen gas forms as a byproduct on the cathode; concurrently, an anodic oxidation of the chloride ion takes place, forming chlorine gas as a byproduct. Separation of the anodic and cathodic spaces in the electrolysis cell is essential for this process.

== Uses ==
KOH and NaOH can be used interchangeably for a number of applications, although in industry, NaOH is preferred because of its lower cost.

=== Purity requirements ===
Manufactured KOH is used in various applications that need various purity levels. For industrial uses, like cleaning metals or treating waste gases, at least 90% purity is required. Food grade applications also require 90% or more purity, and must have arsenic less than 3 ppm and lead less than 5 ppm. KOH at this purity is used to debitterate olives and in the manufacture of cocoa. Electronic grade applications which are used to etch semiconductors and treat silicon wafers in photovoltaic cells require at least 99.9% purity and less than 1 ppm total metal ion concentration. Reagent level uses in pharmaceutical applications and professional analytical labs require purity higher than 99.99% and heavy metals less than 0.1 ppm for safe use.

=== Catalyst for hydrothermal gasification process ===
In industry, KOH is a good catalyst for hydrothermal gasification process. In this process, it is used to improve the yield of gas and amount of hydrogen in process. For example, production of coke from coal often produces much coking wastewater. In order to degrade it, supercritical water is used to convert it to the syngas containing carbon monoxide, carbon dioxide, hydrogen and methane. Using pressure swing adsorption, various gases could be separated, and then power-to-gas technology is used to convert them to fuel. On the other hand, the hydrothermal gasification process could degrade other waste such as sewage sludge and waste from food factories.

=== Precursor to other potassium compounds ===
Many potassium salts are prepared by neutralization reactions involving KOH. The potassium salts of carbonate, cyanide, permanganate, phosphate, and various silicates are prepared by treating either the oxides or the acids with KOH. The high solubility of potassium phosphate is desirable in fertilizers.

=== Manufacture of soft soaps ===
The saponification of fats with KOH is used to prepare the corresponding "potassium soaps", which are softer than the more common sodium hydroxide-derived soaps. Because of their softness and greater solubility, potassium soaps require less water to liquefy, and can thus contain more cleaning agent than liquefied sodium soaps.

=== As an electrolyte ===
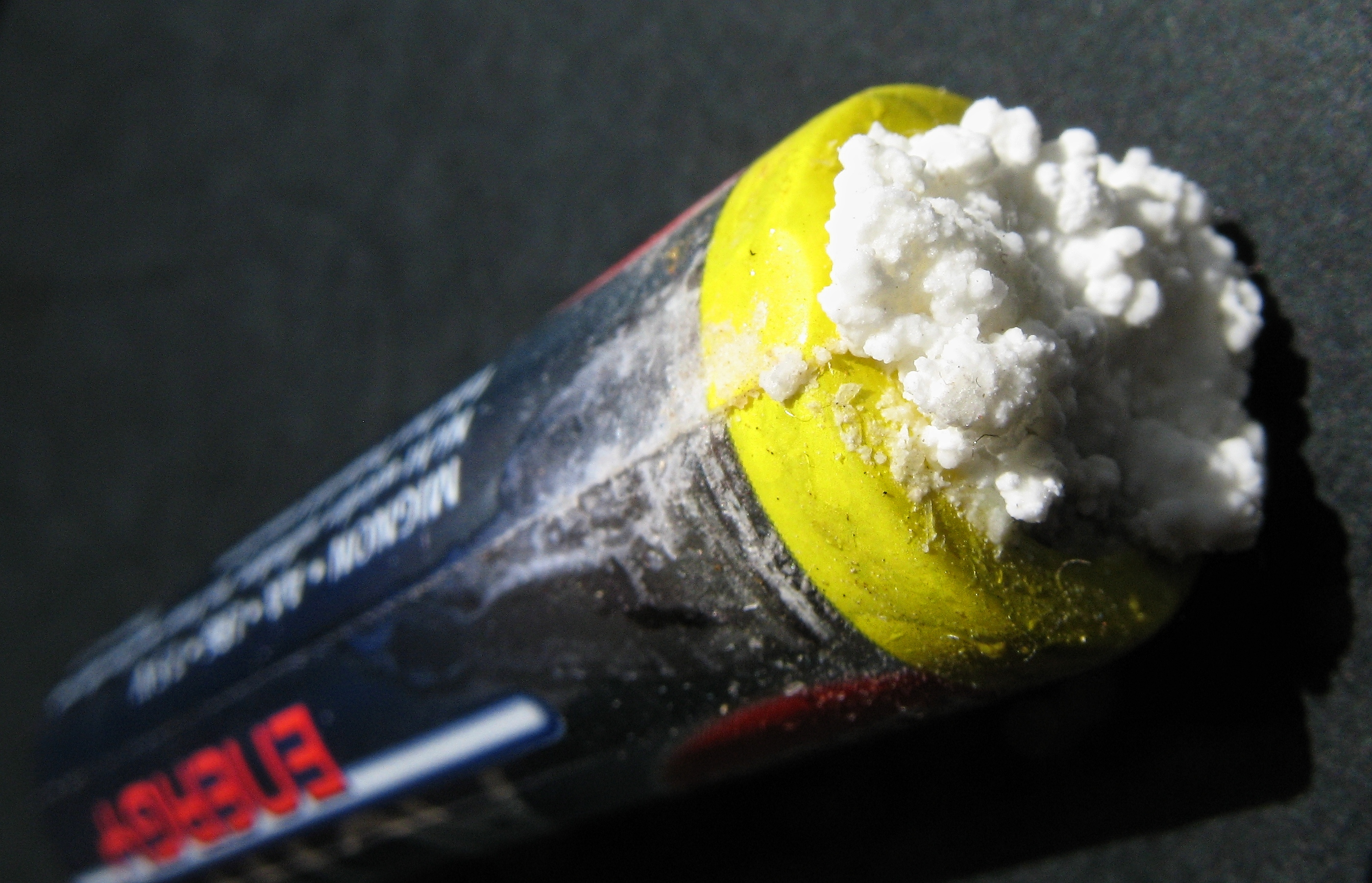
Potassium carbonate, formed from the hydroxide solution leaking from an alkaline battery

Aqueous potassium hydroxide is employed as the electrolyte in alkaline batteries based on nickel-cadmium, nickel-hydrogen, and manganese dioxide-zinc. Potassium hydroxide is preferred over sodium hydroxide because its solutions are more conductive. The nickel–metal hydride batteries in the Toyota Prius use a mixture of potassium hydroxide and sodium hydroxide. Nickel–iron batteries also use potassium hydroxide electrolyte.

=== Food industry ===
In food products, potassium hydroxide acts as a food thickener, pH control agent and food stabilizer. The FDA considers it generally safe as a direct food ingredient when used in accordance with Good Manufacturing Practices. It is known in the E number system as E525.

=== Niche applications ===
Like sodium hydroxide, potassium hydroxide attracts numerous specialized applications, virtually all of which rely on its properties as a strong chemical base with its consequent ability to degrade many materials. For example, in a process commonly referred to as "chemical cremation" or "resomation", potassium hydroxide hastens the decomposition of soft tissues, both animal and human, to leave behind only the bones and other hard tissues. Entomologists wishing to study the fine structure of insect anatomy may use a 10% aqueous solution of KOH to apply this process.

In chemical synthesis, the choice between the use of KOH and the use of NaOH is guided by the solubility or keeping quality of the resulting salt.

The corrosive properties of potassium hydroxide make it a useful ingredient in agents and preparations that clean and disinfect surfaces and materials that can themselves resist corrosion by KOH.

KOH is also used for semiconductor chip fabrication (for example anisotropic wet etching).

Potassium hydroxide is often the main active ingredient in chemical "cuticle removers" used in manicure treatments.

Because aggressive bases like KOH damage the cuticle of the hair shaft, potassium hydroxide is used to chemically assist the removal of hair from animal hides. The hides are soaked for several hours in a solution of KOH and water to prepare them for the unhairing stage of the tanning process. This same effect is also used to weaken human hair in preparation for shaving. Preshave products and some shave creams contain potassium hydroxide to force open the hair cuticle and to act as a hygroscopic agent to attract and force water into the hair shaft, causing further damage to the hair. In this weakened state, the hair is more easily cut by a razor blade.

Potassium hydroxide is used to identify some species of fungi. A 3–5% aqueous solution of KOH is applied to the flesh of a mushroom and the researcher notes whether or not the color of the flesh changes. Certain species of gilled mushrooms, boletes, polypores, and lichens are identifiable based on this color-change reaction.

== Safety ==
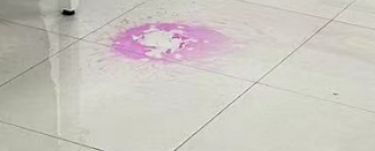
Potassium hydroxide spillage, stained red by phenolphthalein

Potassium hydroxide is a caustic alkali and its solutions range from irritating to skin and other tissue in low concentrations, to highly corrosive in high concentrations. Eyes are particularly vulnerable, and dust or mist is severely irritating to lungs and can cause pulmonary edema. Safety considerations are similar to those of sodium hydroxide.

The caustic effects arise from being highly alkaline, but if potassium hydroxide is neutralised with a non-toxic acid then it becomes a non-toxic potassium salt. It is approved as a food additive under the code E525.

== See also ==
- Potash
- Soda lime
- Saltwater soap – sailors' soap
