= Ohio Center for Law-Related Education =

Law education association

- Formation: 1983
- Headquarters: 1700 Lake Shore Drive, Columbus, Ohio, U.S.
- Website: http://www.oclre.org

The Ohio Center for Law-Related Education (OCLRE) is a non-profit organization that aims to engage Ohio students "in learning about government, law, and the importance of active citizenship." The organization is headquartered out of the Ohio State Bar Association in Columbus, Ohio. It was founded in 1983 and reported a staff of six employees in 2019.

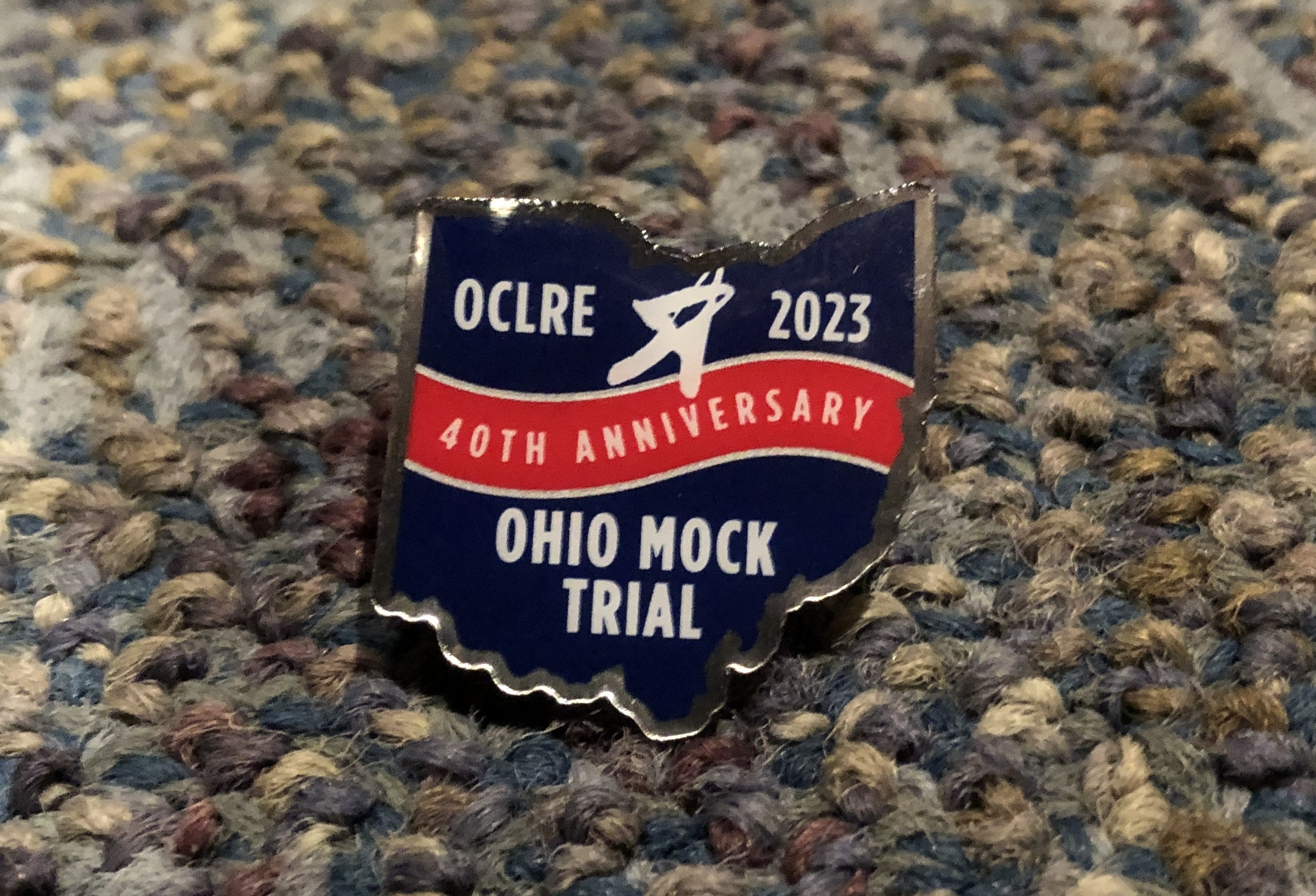
Lapel pin awarded to participants of the OCLRE's 2023 mock trial competition

The OCLRE runs a number of programs, including high school moot court and mock trial, each of which has been broadcast live by the Ohio Channel. The organization has also hosted conferences for teachers and a "citizenship camp" for middle school students. Other programs have included a youth summit and a law and citizenship academy.

The organization is funded by the Ohio State Bar Association, the Ohio Attorney General's Office, the Supreme Court of Ohio, and the ACLU of Ohio, as well as by corporate sponsors and private donors. In 1987, the organization received a grant of nearly $80,000 from the U.S. Department of Education for its mock trial program.
