= Todd Harkins =

American ice hockey player (born 1968)

- Born: October 8, 1968 (age 57) Cleveland, Ohio, U.S.
- Height: 6 ft 3 in (191 cm)
- Weight: 210 lb (95 kg; 15 st 0 lb)
- Position: Center
- Shot: Right
- Played for: Calgary Flames; Hartford Whalers
- National team: United States
- NHL draft: 42nd overall, 1988; Calgary Flames
- Playing career: 1990–2001

Todd Michael Harkins (born October 8, 1968) is an American former professional ice hockey player who played 48 National Hockey League games for the Calgary Flames and Hartford Whalers. Harkins was drafted by the Flames in the 2nd round, 42nd overall in the 1988 NHL entry draft. He has appeared in and consulted on hockey-related movies, and is now an amateur coach and professional scout.

== Amateur career ==
Harkins played center position. His 1981 Cleveland American's Pee Wee team finished third in the nation, which also featured his younger brother Brett Harkins. Harkins and his brother Brett played in the 1981 Quebec International Pee-Wee Hockey Tournament, on the Cleveland minor ice hockey team.

Harkins attended St. Edward High School, located in Lakewood, Ohio, a western suburb of Cleveland. He was an integral member of the 1985 Ohio High School Athletic Association State "big school" hockey champions. St. Edward would later name Harkins to the school's Athletic Hall of Fame.

Harkins played three seasons of college hockey for Miami University, recording 44 points in 40 games in 1989–90. He was a pre-med major but never graduated from Miami. While at Miami, he was selected 42nd overall by the Calgary Flames in 1988.

In the Miami record book, Harkins ranks tied for ninth position for most goals in a season (27), and tied for fourth for power-play goals in a season (13). He also racked up a lot of penalty minutes. He ranks second all-time in career minutes (288), first for the most penalties in a season (62), first in most penalty minutes in a season (133, 1988–89), and is tied with two others for penalty minutes in a game (16 minutes, vs. Ohio State on January 2, 1988).

== Professional career ==
The following season, he turned pro, spending most of the next four seasons in the Flames farm system. Harkins made his NHL debut in 1991–92, appearing in five games with the Flames. The following season, he appeared in 15 more games with Calgary. Late in the 1993–94 season, Harkins was dealt to the Whalers, where he appeared in 28 more NHL games. While he was with the Whalers, he was arrested in Buffalo, New York, along with five other players and coach. On March 24, 1994, the seven were arrested after a nightclub altercation, for which they pleaded guilty to a reduced charge of trespassing. His stint with the Whalers was his last in the NHL. He would return to the minor leagues shortly thereafter.

Harkins stayed to the minor leagues until he went over to Europe in 1997, playing first in the German Deutsche Eishockey Liga, and then the Swiss Nationalliga A. He retired from professional hockey in 2001.

Harkins represented the United States in the Ice Hockey World Championships twice: in 1992, and 1995.

In 1993, Harkins also played inline hockey for the Utah Rollerbees of the Roller Hockey International, scoring 14 goals and 21 points in nine games.

== After retirement ==
Harkins was a credited actor in the 2004 movie Miracle about the 1980 U.S. Olympic Hockey team, in which he portrayed legendary left-winger Valeri Kharlamov as a member of the Soviet Union national ice hockey team.

As a result of appearing in the movie, Harkins was cast in the first season of Making the Cut, a reality television show on the Canadian Broadcasting Corporation that follows amateur players competing for an invitation to an NHL training camp.

Harkins assisted with the 2008 movie Slap Shot 3: The Junior League, for which he choreographed the hockey sequences.

Harkins has held various positions developing young talent including an amateur coach and scout. Harkins was a first year head coach of the North West Vancouver Giants in the BC Hockey Major Midget League for the 2010–11 season and led the team to the BC League and Playoff Provincial Championships, sweeping the Alberta champions to earn the Pacific Region berth in the National Midget Hockey Championships (The Telus Cup). After winning the round-robin portion of the championship, earning a number one seed in the playoff round, they were upset in the semi-final. This Harkins coached team was the first BC Major Midget team in history to qualify for the National Championships. He was awarded the BC Hockey Association Coach of the Year that season and served a second season as head coach in 2011–12, again winning league and playoff Provincial Championships, before losing the eventual National Champion Alberta team in the bid to attend the second Telus Cup in as many years. The following season, in accordance with BC Hockey Association rules, he stepped down when his middle son Jansen was selected to the team. He was also director of hockey operations for the North Shore Winter Club, for 11 years. While at the North Shore Winter Club he coached the 2002–03 Pee Wee AAA Team, winning the Provincial Championships. In this season his team made history becoming the first team west of Ontario to win the World Championships at the historic Quebec International Pee Wee Tournament, in Quebec City. In 2005, Harkins returned to the bench to coach the 2005–06 edition of the North Shore Winter Club Pee Wee AAA team. The team registered a "perfect season", not losing or tying a game in the entire season of league play, winning the final and deciding game for the Provincial Championships 10–1. In 2009, he served as director of player personnel and scouting for the Burnaby Express, a junior "A" team also of the British Columbia Hockey League (BCHL). He has also been a head scout with the Westside Warriors of the BCHL. On July 15, 2014, Harkins accepted a five-year contract as general manager for the Prince George Cougars of the Western Hockey League (WHL), but was released after four seasons.

== Personal life ==
Harkins came from a hockey family. Older brother Donald and younger brother Brett also starred at St. Edward High School. Donald also played collegiately at Miami University. Brett followed in Todd's footsteps in many ways, leaving St. Edward early to play elite amateur hockey in Canada, then onto a strong collegiate career, drafted by the NHL, a career minor leaguer with a brief stint in the NHL, and eventually playing professionally in Europe.

He is married to Kirsten, and they have three sons. His eldest son, Nicklas, was diagnosed with Mucopolysaccharidosis (MPS), a rare genetic disorder. His middle son Jansen was drafted by the Winnipeg Jets. They live in North Vancouver, British Columbia.

== Career statistics ==
			Regular season					Playoffs
Season	Team	League	GP	G	A	Pts	PIM	GP	G	A	Pts	PIM
1986–87	Aurora Eagles	OJHL	40	19	29	48	102	—	—	—	—	—
1987–88	Miami University	NCAA	34	9	7	16	133	—	—	—	—	—
1988–89	Miami University	NCAA	36	8	7	15	77	—	—	—	—	—
1989–90	Miami University	NCAA	40	27	17	44	78	—	—	—	—	—
1990–91	Salt Lake Golden Eagles	IHL	79	15	27	42	113	3	0	0	0	0
1991–92	Calgary Flames	NHL	5	0	0	0	7	—	—	—	—	—
1991–92	Salt Lake Golden Eagles	IHL	72	32	30	62	67	5	1	1	2	6
1992–93	Calgary Flames	NHL	15	2	3	5	22	—	—	—	—	—
1992–93	Salt Lake Golden Eagles	IHL	53	13	21	34	90	—	—	—	—	—
1993–94	Saint John Flames	AHL	38	13	9	22	64	—	—	—	—	—
1993–94	Hartford Whalers	NHL	28	1	0	1	49	—	—	—	—	—
1993–94	Springfield Indians	AHL	1	0	3	3	0	—	—	—	—	—
1994–95	Chicago Wolves	IHL	52	18	25	43	136	—	—	—	—	—
1994–95	Houston Aeros	IHL	25	9	10	19	77	4	1	1	2	28
1995–96	Carolina Monarchs	AHL	69	27	28	55	172	—	—	—	—	—
1996–97	Fort Wayne Komets	IHL	60	12	13	25	131	—	—	—	—	—
1996–97	Phoenix Roadrunners	IHL	16	4	3	7	24	—	—	—	—	—
1997–98	Düsseldorfer EG	DEL	49	13	24	37	117	3	2	0	2	12
1998–99	SERC Wild Wings	DEL	51	25	9	34	137	—	—	—	—	—
1999–00	SERC Wild Wings	DEL	55	13	18	31	99	—	—	—	—	—
2000–01	Eisbären Berlin	DEL	48	9	8	17	83	—	—	—	—	—
2000–01	EV Zug	NLA	—	—	—	—	—	1	0	0	0	6
NHL totals			48	3	3	6	78	—	—	—	—	—
AHL totals			108	40	40	80	236	—	—	—	—	—
IHL totals			357	103	129	232	638	12	2	2	4	34
