= Chuck Kyle =

American football coach (born 1950)

Chuck Kyle (born November 22, 1950) is a former teacher of the English Language at St. Ignatius High School in Cleveland, Ohio, and former American football coach. From 1983 to 2022, he coached at Saint Ignatius, owning an overall record of 353-90-1 (.797) and a mark of 72-18 (.800) in Ohio state playoffs. He led the St. Ignatius Wildcats to a state-record 11 Division I State Titles: 1988, 1989, 1991, 1992, 1993, 1994, 1995, 1999, 2001, 2008, and 2011. Kyle's Wildcats have also won National Championships in 1989, 1993, 1995, and 2008. In 2018, Kyle was named the 6th greatest high school football coach of all time in a computerized ranking by MaxPreps. Coach Kyle was inducted into the 2024 class of the National High School Football Hall of Fame, in the City of Canton, Ohio. In February 2026, Amazon Prime Video released The Object of the Game, a three-part sports docuseries directed by Matt Waldeck that follows Coach Kyle during his final season while featuring commentary from prominent figures including Bill Belichick, Tony Romo, Mike Tomlin, and Roger Goodell.
