= Brett Harkins =

American ice hockey player (born 1970)

- Born: July 2, 1970 (age 56) North Ridgeville, Ohio, U.S.
- Height: 6 ft 2 in (188 cm)
- Weight: 172 lb (78 kg; 12 st 4 lb)
- Position: Left wing
- Shot: Right
- Played for: Boston Bruins; Florida Panthers; Columbus Blue Jackets; HIFK
- NHL draft: 133rd overall, 1989; New York Islanders
- Playing career: 1993–2008

Brett Alan Harkins (born July 2, 1970) is an American former professional ice hockey left wing, who played for 18 years. He played in the National Hockey League in four stints with the Boston Bruins, Florida Panthers, and Columbus Blue Jackets between 1994 and 2002. As of January 2020, Harkins had served as a college-level scout for the Boston Bruins for over four seasons.

Harkins is also the younger brother of Todd Harkins, who played for the Hartford Whalers and Calgary Flames.

== Amateur career ==
As a youth, Harkins played in the 1981 Quebec International Pee-Wee Hockey Tournament along with his brother Todd, as a member of a minor ice hockey team from Cleveland.

Harkins attended St. Edward High School, located in Lakewood, Ohio, a western suburb of Cleveland. He was an integral member of the 1986 Ohio High School Athletic Association State "big school" hockey champions. However, he would leave St. Edward to attend St. Andrews High School north of Toronto before joining the Junior A Brockville Braves. He played in 38 games for Detroit Compuware Ambassadors of the NAJHL in 1988-89, scoring 69 points. He would play collegiately for Bowling Green State University from 1989 to 1993. In 2013, Harkins served as the head coach of the U-16 Midget Minor Cleveland Barons, assisted by Johnny Goebel, Jeremy Bronson, and his brother Donnie Harkins.

== Professional career ==
Harkins was drafted in the seventh round, 133rd overall, by the New York Islanders in the 1989 NHL entry draft. He played 78 games in the National Hockey League with the Boston Bruins, Florida Panthers, and Columbus Blue Jackets. He last played professionally in the Swedish and Finnish leagues until his retirement 2008, ending his professional playing career with Rögle BK of HockeyAllsvenskan. First player born in Ohio to play for the Columbus Blue Jackets.

== Career statistics ==
=== Regular season and playoffs ===
			Regular season					Playoffs
Season	Team	League	GP	G	A	Pts	PIM	GP	G	A	Pts	PIM
1985–86	St. Edward High School	HS-OH	—	—	—	—	—	—	—	—	—	—
1986–87	St. Andrew's College	CISAA	30	47	60	107	—	—	—	—	—	—
1987–88	Brockville Braves	CJHL	55	21	55	76	36	—	—	—	—	—
1988–89	Detroit Compuware Ambassadors	NAHL	38	23	46	69	94	—	—	—	—	—
1989–90	Bowling Green State University	CCHA	41	11	43	54	45	—	—	—	—	—
1990–91	Bowling Green State University	CCHA	40	22	38	60	30	—	—	—	—	—
1991–92	Bowling Green State University	CCHA	34	8	39	47	32	—	—	—	—	—
1992–93	Bowling Green State University	CCHA	35	19	28	47	28	—	—	—	—	—
1993–94	Adirondack Red Wings	AHL	80	22	47	69	23	10	1	5	6	4
1994–95	Boston Bruins	NHL	1	0	1	1	0	—	—	—	—	—
1994–95	Providence Bruins	AHL	80	23	69	92	32	13	8	14	22	4
1995–96	Florida Panthers	NHL	8	0	3	3	6	—	—	—	—	—
1995–96	Carolina Monarchs	AHL	55	23	71	94	44	—	—	—	—	—
1996–97	Boston Bruins	NHL	44	4	14	18	8	—	—	—	—	—
1996–97	Providence Bruins	AHL	28	9	31	40	32	10	2	10	12	0
1997–98	Cleveland Lumberjacks	IHL	80	32	62	94	82	10	4	13	17	14
1998–99	Cleveland Lumberjacks	IHL	74	20	67	87	84	—	—	—	—	—
1999–00	Cleveland Lumberjacks	IHL	76	20	50	70	79	9	2	8	10	6
2000–01	Houston Aeros	IHL	81	16	64	80	51	7	0	3	3	8
2001–02	Columbus Blue Jackets	NHL	25	2	12	14	8	—	—	—	—	—
2001–02	Syracuse Crunch	AHL	22	4	20	24	13	—	—	—	—	—
2002–03	Skellefteå AIK	SWE-2	33	15	23	38	77	9	1	8	9	6
2003–04	HIFK	FIN	52	10	49	59	65	13	4	9	13	12
2004–05	HIFK	FIN	52	4	30	34	83	5	0	0	0	4
2005–06	Jokerit	FIN	10	1	2	3	2	—	—	—	—	—
2005–06	Skellefteå AIK	SWE-2	26	4	30	34	77	10	1	6	7	10
2006–07	Skellefteå AIK	SWE	32	1	13	14	18	—	—	—	—	—
2006–07	Rögle BK	SWE-2	5	1	5	6	2	9	3	4	7	16
2007–08	Rögle BK	SWE-2	35	3	24	27	67	10	2	8	10	4
AHL totals			265	81	238	319	144	33	11	29	40	8
NHL totals			78	6	30	36	22	—	—	—	—	—

== Awards and honors ==
Award	Year
All-CCHA Rookie Team	1989-90
