= Murphy Oil Soap =

American cleaning product brand

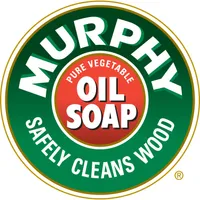
- Product type: Cleaning product
- Current owner: Colgate-Palmolive
- Country: United States
- Introduced: 1910
- Website: www.murphyoilsoap.com

Murphy Oil Soap is an American brand of cleaning product that is manufactured by Colgate-Palmolive. In 1910, Jeremiah Murphy, director of the Phoenix Oil Company, bought the formula for Murphy Oil Soap from a recent immigrant from Germany. The soap, with its potassium vegetable oil base, and no phosphates, proved to be very popular in Ohio. The company continued to be run by the Murphy family for 80 years, when they sold it to Colgate. It is available in a concentrated liquid form which is then mixed with water, as well as pre-diluted form which comes in a trigger spray bottle. Commercials for the product state that the product is ideal for cleaning wood surfaces.

The other constituents of Murphy Oil Soap are sodium EDTA, propylene glycol, fragrance, surfactants, and water.

== Uses ==
Murphy Oil Soap is commonly used to clean and polish horse tack, such as bridles and saddles. It is also commonly used to clean black-powder weapons after use, since the lack of petroleum-based oil and the presence of vegetable oil lessens the amount of sludge created when cleaning black powder residues from weapons. Murphy Oil Soap has been found to efficiently remove the residue that builds up on automobile wheels and hubcaps from the disc brakes. It is an excellent lubricant to use with water when throwing clay on a potter's wheel. Likewise the soap is often used as a release agent for plaster mold making. It has been found to quickly and easily dissolve water-based inks, such as Crayola marker ink, from acid-free paper. Murphy Oil Soap is also a favorite among artists as a brush cleaner. After removing excess oil paint from the brush with a rag and cleaning with a mineral spirit, the brush can be cleaned with a small amount of diluted soap. Diluted Murphy Oil Soap (2–4%) is often used by home gardeners as an insecticidal soap spray.

== See also ==
- Saltwater soap
