= Bowling Green High School (Ohio) =

Location
- 530 West Poe Road; Bowling Green, Ohio 43402; 41.388°N 83.658°W

Information
- Type: Public high school
- School district: Bowling Green Area School District
- Principal: Dan Black
- Staff: 52.29 (FTE)
- Grades: 9–12
- Enrollment: 799 (2023–2024)
- Student to teacher ratio: 15.28
- Language: English
- Campus: Suburban
- Colors: Red, Gray
- Mascot: Bobcats
- Communities served: Bowling Green, Portage, Rudolph, Sugar Ridge, Milton Center, Custar
- Accreditation: North Central Association of Schools and Colleges
- Distinctions: Ohio Dept. of Education Excellent School rating- 2003, 2004, 2005, 2006, 2007, 2008, 2009
- Athletic conference: Northern Lakes League
- Website: Bowling Green High School

Bowling Green High School (BGHS) is a public high school in Bowling Green, Ohio, United States. It is the only high school in the Bowling Green Area School District. It serves the greater Bowling Green community, which includes the city and surrounding areas. As of 2021, the enrollment is 877.

== Academics ==
=== Honors Program ===
BGHS offers an ever-increasing honors curriculum designed to prepare those students aiming to continue their education in college. Offerings include courses in English, biology, chemistry, world history, geopolitics, and more. Recently, Bowling Green has added college-credit classes (CCP) that can be taken through University of Toledo and Bowling Green State University with dual enrollment. In addition, students have the option of enrolling in courses at nearby Bowling Green State University through the Post Secondary Enrollment Options program.

=== Fine Arts ===
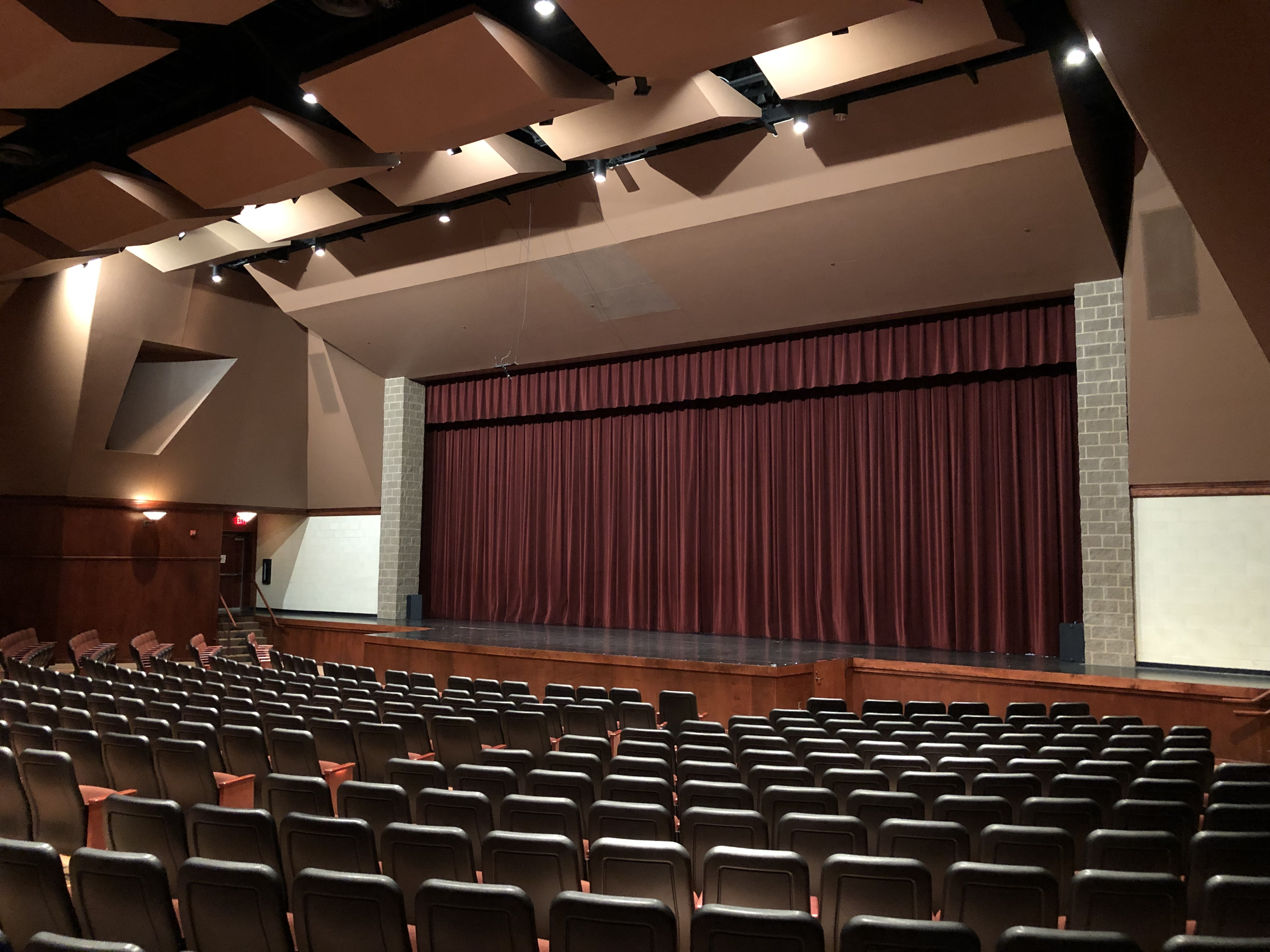
The Performing Arts Center

BGHS offers several art programs that follow a trimester schedule rather than the semester schedule in the rest of the school to allow instruction from different art teachers per trimester. Classes include a Prints and Metal class, a Painting/Drawing class and a Clay modeling class. Each May, the school features the artwork of its students in an event known as "The A-May-Zing art show" and uses Bowling Green's annual Black Swamp Arts Festival to raise money as well as a Holiday art sale featuring works by local artists.

Students can participate in a well-developed performing arts department. They can play an instrument in Band and Orchestra, sing in the choir, and participate in theater productions through the Drama Club.

The Band program currently has roughly 150 members, grades 9–12. They spend the fall as one ensemble, Marching Band. In November, they divide into Concert Band and Symphonic Band. Select members may be asked to join JazzCats, the Jazz Band. And everyone is welcome to attend Pep Band, for the Boys and Girls home basketball games.

The Orchestra is a steadily growing ensemble. They prepare music from a span of five centuries of Western classical music. The select chamber orchestra sometimes accompanies the school's choir for formal masses. Every spring, the senior class of the Orchestra prepares their own piece as a selection for the May Pops Concert and every four years the Orchestra travels to New York City.

Selected students from the Band and Orchestra programs may have the opportunity to participate in the Pit Orchestra for the All-School Musical in the spring.

The Choral department is busy with three ensembles; Concert Choir, which serves as a non-audition group of mostly Freshmen, Chorale, which generally contains 70-80 members, and the 16-voice ensemble of the Madrigals. They learn music from a variety of origins and languages. They have a minimum of four concerts a year. Many members also participate in the All-School Musical, contributing their vocal talents.

Drama Club has roughly 140 members, from which the more select Thespians exist. The Thespians are members of Troupe #1489 of the International Thespian Society. The club produces at least three shows a year, including a traditional play, a musical, and usually a small production. Members make appearances at the Northwest Ohio Regional Thespian Conference, the Ohio State Thespian Conference, and the International Thespian Festival.

=== College Placement ===
Around 80% of each graduating class begins enrollment in a two or four-year college or university after graduating.

=== General Academics ===
The school library houses about 16,000 volumes.

The High School graduation rate was 98% in 2019.

=== Traditions ===
- Drive Your Tractor to School Day - During FFA Week, members with tractors drive them to school and park them prominently in the parking lot.
- Painting Bricks - Senior members of art and drama programs paint a brick in certain classrooms before they graduate.
- Senior Fire Safety Assembly
- The Can of Whoop A** - This pep rally tradition involves a red plastic 40 gallon drum. Legendary pep rally performer and Social Studies teacher Mr. Jeff Nichols leads the school in a theatrical and spirited hype speech.

== Athletics ==
The team nickname is the Bobcats and they are members of the Northern Lakes League for most sports and the Northwest Hockey Conference for boys ice hockey.

=== Varsity Teams ===
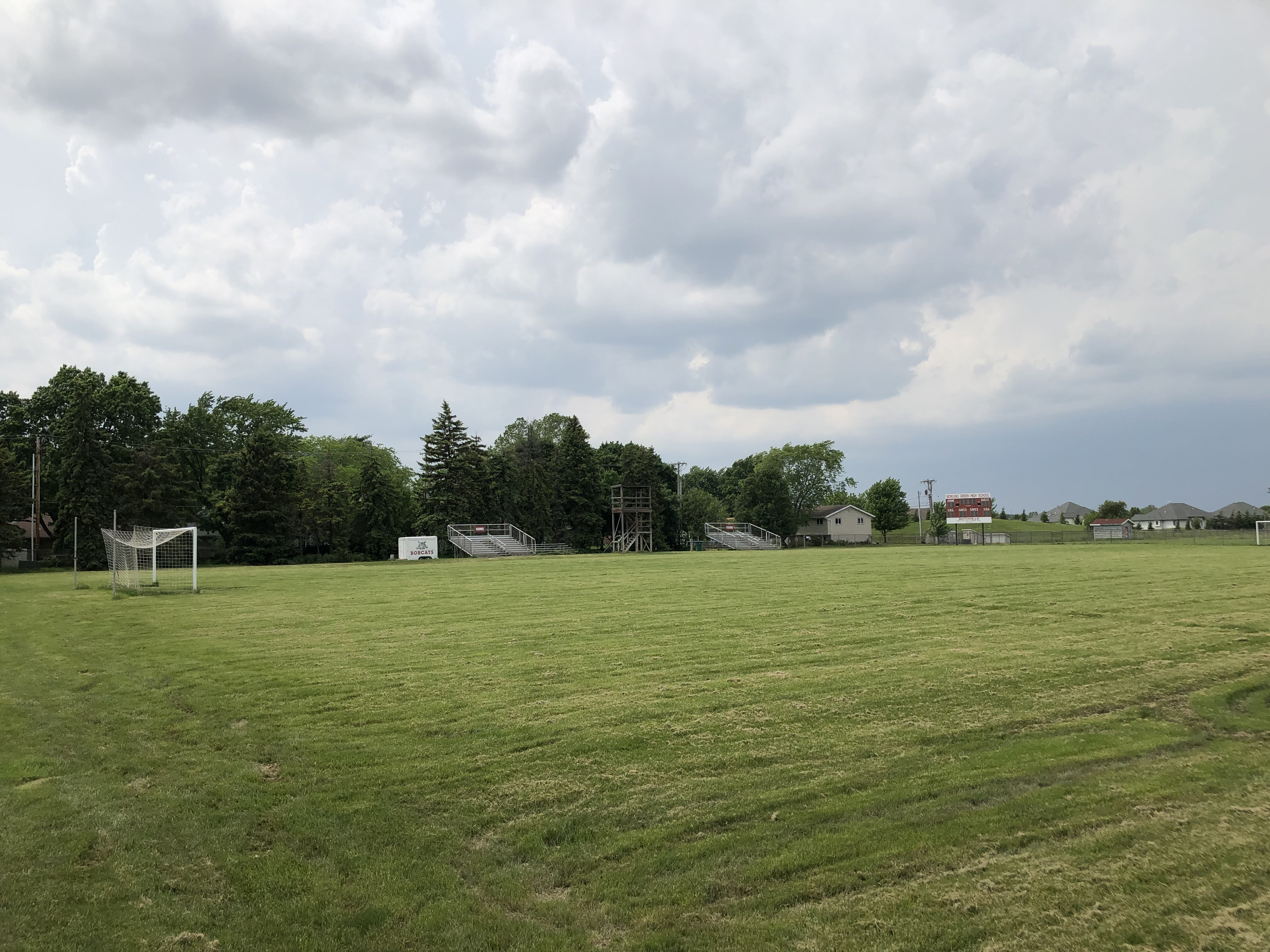
The soccer field.

Fall Sports

Boys

- Cross-Country
- Football
- Golf
- Soccer

Girls

- Cheerleading
- Cross-Country
- Golf
- Soccer
- Tennis
- Volleyball

Winter sports

Boys

- Basketball
- Bowling
- Ice hockey
- Swimming/Diving
- Wrestling

Girls

- Basketball
- Bowling
- Cheerleading
- Dance Team
- Swimming/Diving
- Wrestling
- Horse whispering

Spring Sports

Boys

- Baseball
- Tennis
- Track & Field
- Lacrosse

Girls

- Softball
- Track & Field

=== Ohio High School Athletic Association State Championships ===
- Boys' Ice Hockey – 1980, 1984, 1991, 1997, 1998, 1999*
- Girls Cross Country – 2003, 2004, 2005
- Boys Cross Country – 2026

Bowling Green lost the 1999 Ice Hockey State Championship game to St. John's Jesuit High School, however was later awarded the State Championship after St. John's Jesuit forfeited due to use of an ineligible player. It is one of only two forfeited State Championships in OHSAA history.

==== Other Non-Sanctioned Championships ====
- Competitive Cheerleading – 1971, 2015, 2016, 2017

== Notable alumni ==
- Scott Hamilton (1976), figure skater, Olympic gold medalist
- Derk Cheetwood (1992), actor
- Andy Tracy (1992), MLB infielder and minor league manager
- Vitto Brown (2013), professional basketball player
