= St. Edward High School (Ohio) =

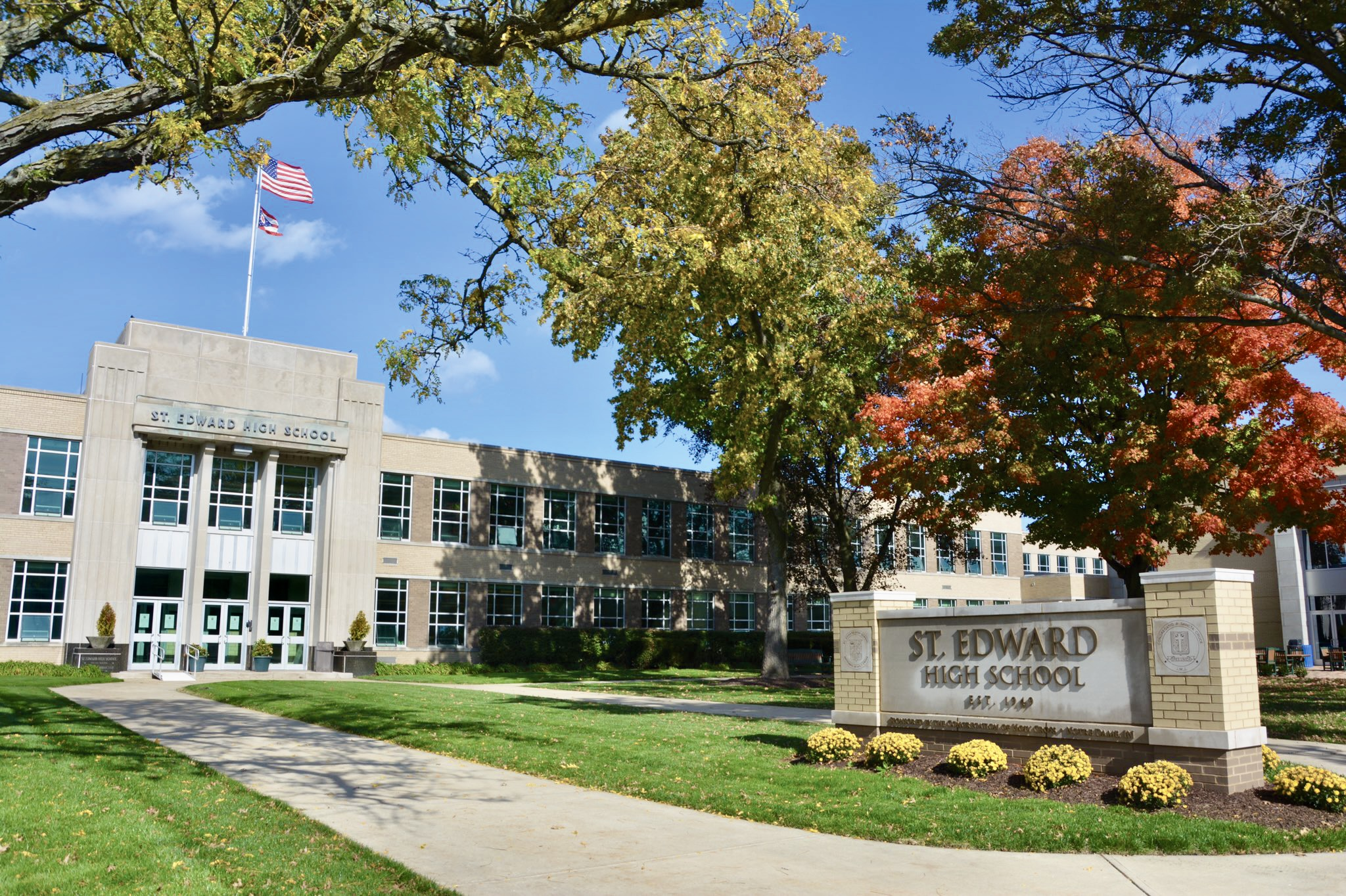
- St. Edward High School, May 2023

Location
- 13500 Detroit Avenue; Lakewood, Ohio 44107; United States

Information
- Type: Private school
- Religious affiliation: Roman Catholic
- Established: 1949
- Oversight: Congregation of Holy Cross
- President: KC McKenna
- Principal: Matthew Altieri
- Teaching staff: 65 (FTE)
- Grades: 9–12
- Gender: Boys
- Enrollment: 863 (2023–2024)
- Student to teacher ratio: 10:1
- Campus type: Suburban
- Colors: Green and gold
- Athletics conference: OHSAA
- Nickname: Eagles
- Rival: Saint Ignatius High School
- Accreditation: Independent Schools Association of the Central States (ISACS)
- Publication: Flight
- Newspaper: Edsman
- Yearbook: Edwardian
- Tuition: $20,550
- Website: www.sehs.net

St. Edward High School is an all-boys Catholic high school in Lakewood, Ohio, United States. It was founded in 1949 and is operated by the Midwest Province of the Brothers of Holy Cross. It is one of three remaining all-boys Catholic high schools in the Greater Cleveland area (Benedictine and Saint Ignatius being the others), and had an enrollment of 863 students as of the 2023–2024 school year.

== History ==
St. Edward High School was founded in 1949 by the Brothers of Holy Cross and named in honor of Saint Edward the Confessor. It was also a nod toward Archbishop Edward F. Hoban, the head of the Diocese of Cleveland who invited the Brothers of Holy Cross to start several Catholic high schools in the Cleveland suburbs after World War II. The Brothers of Holy Cross would start Gilmour Academy in 1946 in the eastern suburb of Gates Mills, St. Edward in the western suburbs, and Archbishop Hoban High School in 1953 in nearby Akron, Ohio. The first graduating class of 1953 consisted of 159 students, including several prominent Clevelanders, most notably talk show host Phil Donahue.

== Academics ==
St. Edward High School offers a rigorous college-preparatory curriculum and several specialized programs, including pre-engineering, business and entrepreneurship, and film. The pre-engineering program began in 2001, with classes in the Joseph & Helen Lowe Institute for Innovation. Students in the pre-engineering program engage in a curriculum rooted in the engineering design cycle. In the 2008 school year, St. Edward began offering an entrepreneurship program for seniors, which has since grown to welcome all interested students and a curriculum with studies in both business management and entrepreneurship. In 2012, St. Edward launched its film program, which trains students in filmmaking and film media studies in a collaborative environment. Since its inception, the program has received local, regional, and national recognition from organizations like the Cleveland International Film Festival and the National Academy of Television Arts and Sciences.

In the fall of 2010, St. Edward began to offer the International Baccalaureate Diploma Programme.

St. Edward has three student-produced publications: a literary and art magazine called Flight, a yearbook titled Edwardian, and a monthly newspaper/news magazine called the Edsman.

St. Edward's Latin Club, The Knights of the Tiber, functions as a local chapter of both the Ohio Junior Classical League (OJCL) and National Junior Classical League (NJCL).

The school was recognized by the United States Department of Education as a "Blue Ribbon School" for the 1994–1995, 1995–1996, and 2018-2019 school years.

== Demographics ==
St. Edward's student body includes students from all over Northeast Ohio. Many come from Catholic elementary schools, while others enroll after finishing at public or secular private elementary, junior high, or middle schools. The 863 young men enrolled at St. Edward come from a variety of race, economic, and religious strata. Roughly 25% of students are first generation, and 24% are students of color.

== Campus ==
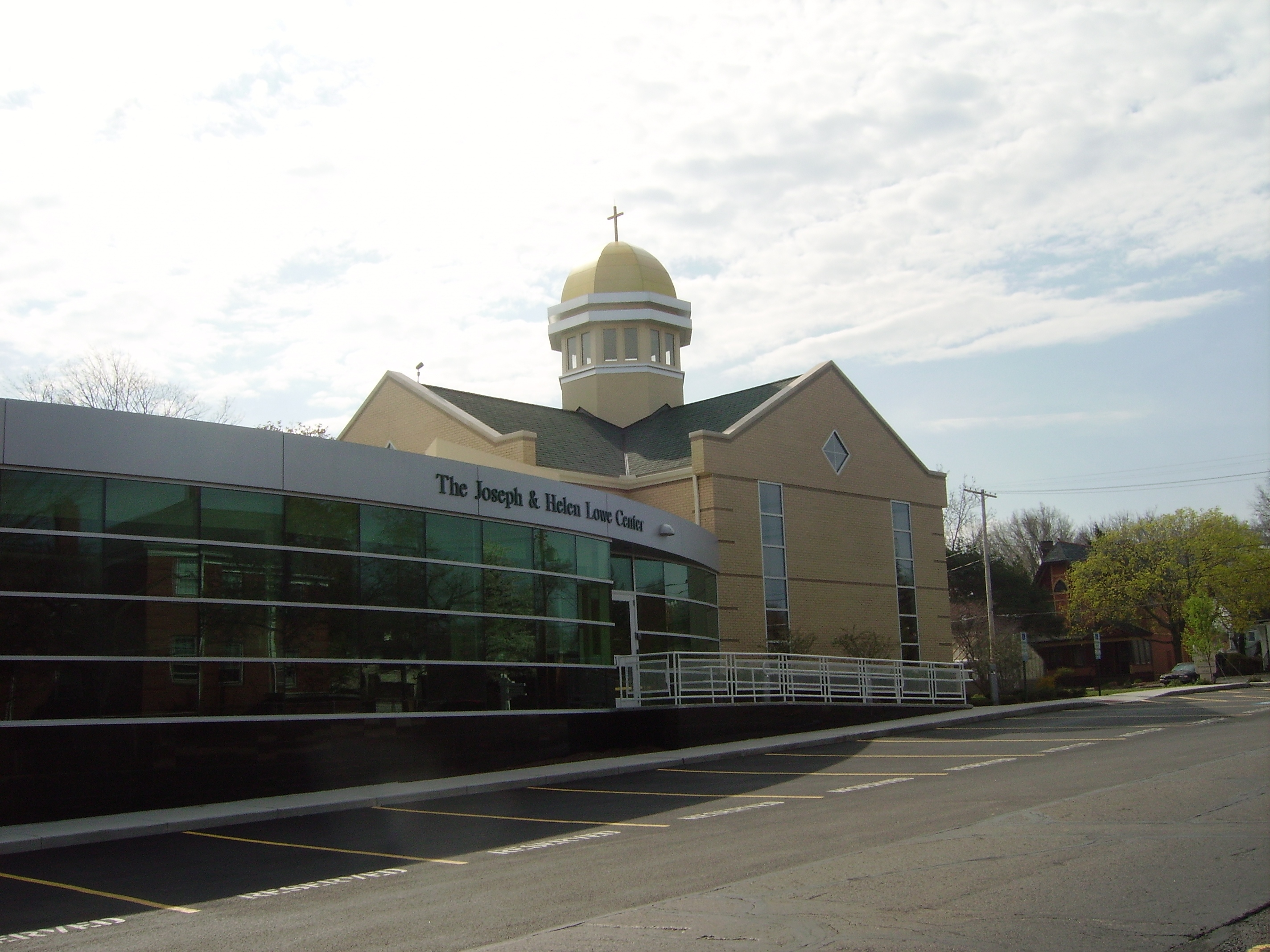
The Joseph & Helen Lowe Institute for Innovation and the Holy Family Chapel

Construction on the school's current facility began in 1949 on a site that once served as a resting and feeding stop for cattle trains passing through from western states to eastern markets on what is now known as the Norfolk Southern roadbed. Classes began immediately in a temporary location roughly three blocks west of the school's current location in the building of the former St. Theresa's Academy. A year later, new freshmen were taught in makeshift classrooms in the basement of St. James Grade School, located roughly 1.5 miles away at the corner of Detroit Road and Granger avenues.

In 2000, the school began a capital campaign to upgrade and transform the physical plant, including a new gym, weight room and indoor track. The Kahl Student Life & Leadership Center, named for Manco founder Jack Kahl, was dedicated in 2004.

On July 31, 2008, St. Edward dedicated a $3.4 million Joseph & Helen Lowe Pre-Engineering and Technology Center. The facility was named after the parents of Gregg Lowe, the former senior vice president of High-Performance Analog Business Units at Texas Instruments and a 1980 graduate of the high school.

The new Holy Family Chapel, topped with a decorative gold dome - in recognition of the University of Notre Dame in South Bend, Indiana, which is also a Holy Cross institution, was dedicated on September 29, 2008. The chapel contains a bronze crucifix created by St. Edward alumnus, sculptor Jerry McKenna, who also makes bronze busts for the Pro Football Hall of Fame.

In September 2016, St. Edward launched its Courage to Act capital campaign revolving around three pillars: Affordability, Innovation, and Hospitality. At the beginning of the 2019–2020 school year, it was announced that the campaign raised over $25 million. This sum was used to increase the school's endowment; expand the Joseph & Helen Lowe Pre-Engineering and Technology Center, renaming it the Joseph & Helen Lowe Institute for Innovation; and construct the Marilyn and David Palisin '64 Commons, a new entrance and dining hall which opened prior to the start of the 2020–2021 school year.

== Athletic programs ==
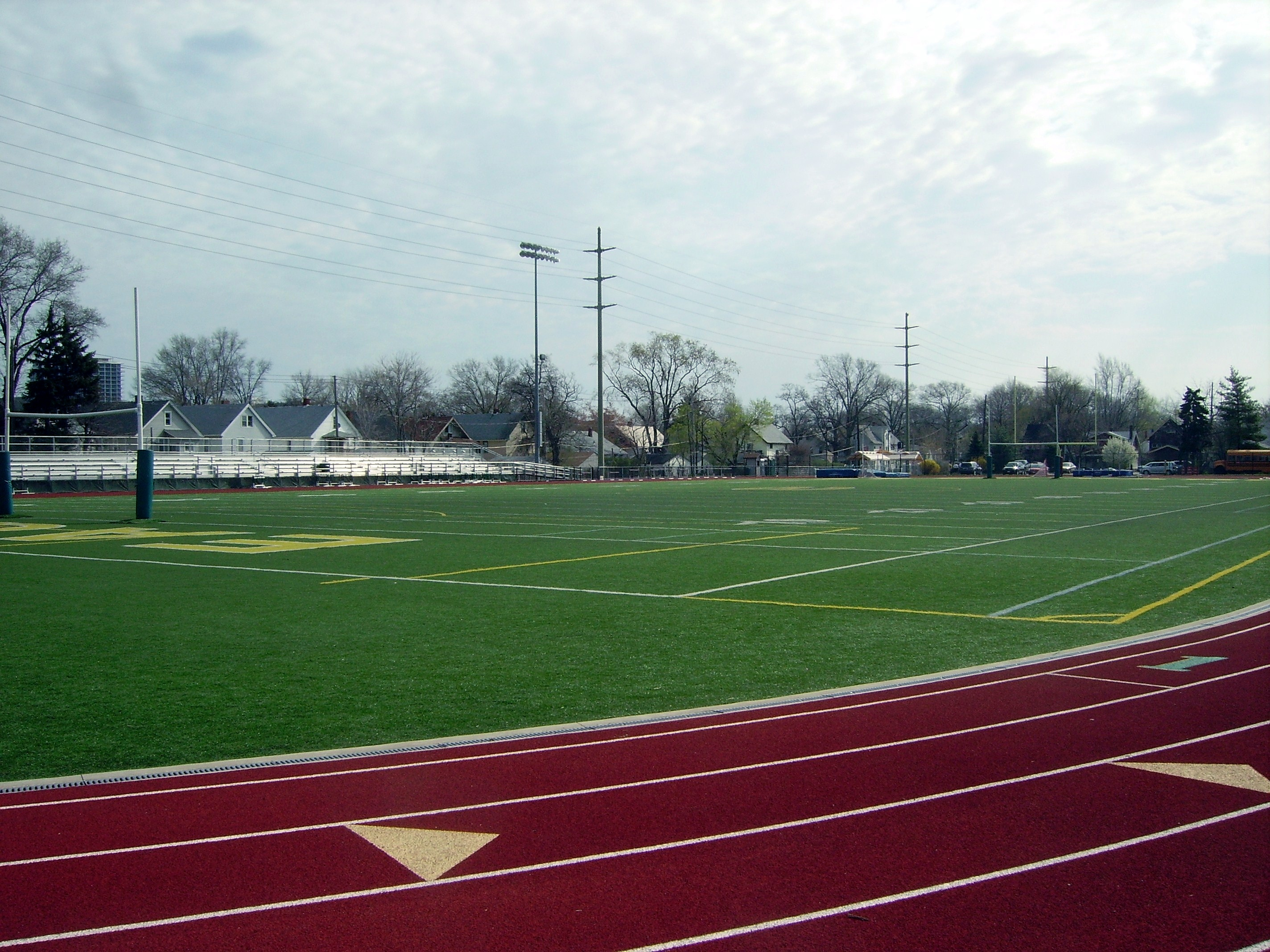
Br. James Everett, C.S.C. Stadium. Home varsity football games are played at Lakewood High School, but most other field sports use this facility.

Since 1978, the St. Edward athletic program has won 68 Ohio High School Athletic Association (OHSAA) team state championships, tied with St. Xavier High School for the most by any school in Ohio, as well as 11 national championships.

=== Football ===
St. Edward has emerged as a perennial contender for the OHSAA Division 1 state championship having achieved seven titles in 14 years: 2010, 2014, 2015, 2018, 2021, 2022, and 2023. The Eagles were also named co-national champions in 2010, with a perfect 15–0 record.

- Football – 2010, 2014, 2015, 2018, 2021, 2022, and 2023.

=== Wrestling ===
Since 1959, the wrestling program has produced:

- 38 OHSAA wrestling tournament team state championships: 1978, 1979, 1980, 1981, 1982, 1983, 1984, 1985, 1986, 1987, 1989, 1992, 1997, 1998, 1999, 2000, 2001, 2002, 2003, 2004, 2005, 2006, 2007, 2008, 2009, 2011, 2012, 2013, 2015, 2016, 2017, 2018, 2019, 2021, 2022, 2023, 2024 and 2025
- 5 OHSAA wrestling dual team state championships: 2013, 2016, 2017, 2019, 2020
- 117 OHSAA wrestling individual state champions
- 11 national championships: 1982, 1983, 1984, 1985, 1986, 1987, 1989, 1992, 1998, 2000, 2007

=== Ice hockey ===
The Eagles ice hockey team has won 11 OHSAA state titles, which is an Ohio state record for that sport.

Former WHA/AHL goalie Bob Whidden was named the coach in 1984. In his first year as coach, Whidden's Eagles won the 1985 OHSAA State Champions. Whidden retired in 2005, having coached the team to ten state titles during his tenure and was named to the St. Edward's Athletic Hall of Fame in 2009. In 2005, St. Ed's hired Whidden's son, Rob who in 2008, led his alma mater to their 11th state title. He was fired prior to the 2010 season. From 2010 to 2018, the Eagles were coached by Troy Gray, who played as a winger on the 1985 team. In 2019, St. Edward named Tim Sullivan ‘92 as the new head coach after mutually parting ways with Troy Gray.

Eagles alumni Todd Harkins, Brett Harkins, and Michael Rupp all played professionally.

- Ice hockey State Championships – 1985, 1986, 1990, 1992, 1994, 1995, 1996, 2002, 2004, 2005, 2008

=== Other sports ===
The OHSAA has awarded the school the following state championships:

- Boys' basketball – 1998, 2014
- Baseball – 1998, 2008, 2010
- Boys' Track & field – 2012, 2013

=== Non-OHSAA championships ===
- Boys' indoor track – 2012, 2013, 2014
- Boys' Rugby – 2012, 2013, 2016
- Boys' volleyball – 2011
- Dual-meet wrestling – 2021, 2022, 2023, 2024, 2025, 2026

=== Historic rivalries ===
The two main historic rivalries are with St. Joseph High School (now Villa Angela-St. Joseph or VASJ) and Saint Ignatius High School.

The St. Joseph rivalry pitted a large school on the east side of Cleveland (St. Joseph) against a large west suburban school (St. Edward). After merging with Villa Angela Academy in the 1990s to become VASJ, the enrollment of VASJ dropped and the rivalry faded. However, the Eagles and Vikings' basketball teams still play an annual game.

With the rise to football and overall sport prominence of Saint Ignatius, along with the proximity of the two schools, Saint Ignatius replaced St. Joseph/VASJ as the main rival of St. Edward, while St. Edward replaced Cathedral Latin (which closed and later merged with Notre Dame Academy) as the main rival for Saint Ignatius.

In the 1990s, the Eagles and the Walsh Jesuit Warriors engaged in a fierce wrestling rivalry that was the subject of a docuseries titled Clash of Dynasties.
