= Saint Ignatius High School (Cleveland) =

Location
- 1911 West 30th Street; Cleveland, Ohio 44113; United States

Information
- Type: Private
- Motto: "Ad Majorem Dei Gloriam" (For the Greater Glory of God)
- Religious affiliation: Jesuit
- Established: 1886
- Locale: Urban
- Principal: Anthony Fior
- Faculty: 115
- Grades: 9–12
- Gender: Male
- Enrollment: 1,504 (2022–23)
- Colors: Blue and gold
- Team name: Wildcats
- Rival: St. Edward High School
- Accreditation: AdvancED commission
- Newspaper: The Eye
- Yearbook: The Ignatian
- Annual tuition: $20,550 (2024)
- Website: www.ignatius.edu
- St. Ignatius High School
- U.S. National Register of Historic Places
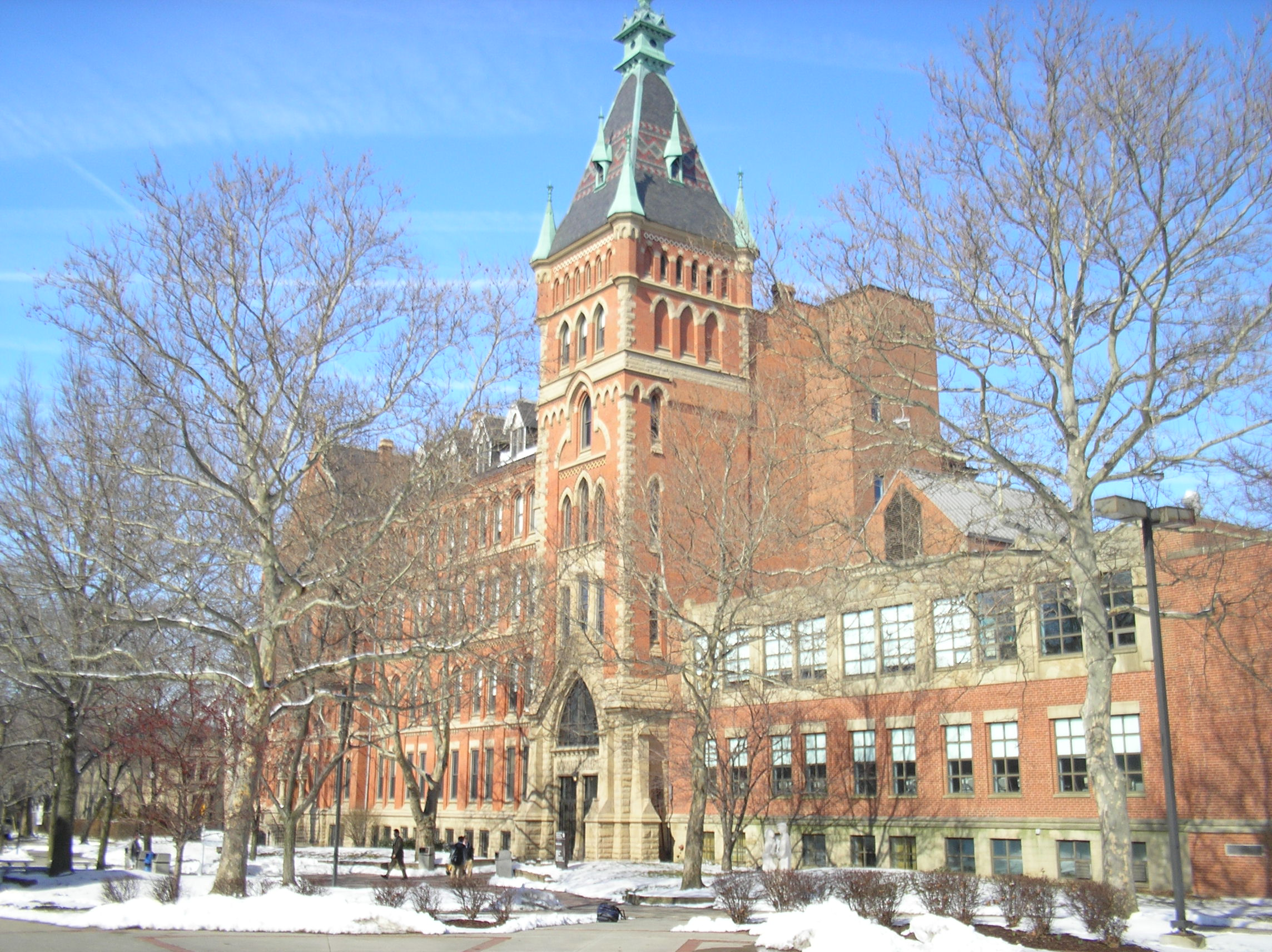
- The Main Building, completed in 1891

- Location within Cleveland Location within Ohio Location within the United States
- Location: Cleveland, Ohio
- Coordinates: 41°29′0″N 81°42′28″W
- Built: 1888
- Architect: Brother Wipfler
- Architectural style: Gothic
- NRHP reference No.: 74001451
- Added to NRHP: January 21, 1974

Saint Ignatius High School is a private Catholic, Jesuit boys' high school in the Ohio City neighborhood of Cleveland, Ohio, United States.

== History ==
Founded in 1886 by a German Jesuit on the invitation of Bishop Richard Gilmour, the school was originally a six-year secondary school based on the German Gymnasium that was to be attended after the completion of six years of grammar school. Separate four-year high school and college programs were formed in 1902, with the college changing its name to John Carroll University in 1923 and moving out of the Cleveland location to neighboring University Heights, Ohio, in 1935.

The words and music of St. Ignatius' alma mater were composed by the school's band director, Jack T. Hearns, in August 1937. His band debuted the alma mater at halftime during a football game on October 1, 1937, replacing their customary "Victory March". In 1958, St. Ignatius gave St. Xavier High School in Cincinnati permission to adapt the song.

== Campus ==
Saint Ignatius High School remains at its original location at 1911 West 30th Street. The campus includes the original structure, now known as the Main Building, which was completed in 1891 and is now a designated Cleveland Historic Landmark. On January 21, 1974, Saint Ignatius was added to the National Register of Historic Places.

Other buildings are Loyola Hall (originally St. Mary of the Assumption Elementary School), Clavius Science Center, Saint Mary of the Assumption Chapel (named after a church that once was located on the current campus), Gibbons Hall, Kesicki Hall (which now houses The Welsh Academy), The Carfagna Family Magis Athletic Center, Father Sullivan, S.J. Gymnasium, Murphy Field House, Kyle Field, McLaughlin Field, and the O'Donnell Athletic Complex, which houses Wasmer Field and Dale Gabor Track. In addition, the $11.5 million Breen Center for the Performing Arts replaced the Xavier Center in August 2009. It houses all student performing arts programs and hosts many events for other local arts groups. A new $3.3 million cafeteria has replaced the former Student Center, stage, senior lounge, and cooking areas. It was renamed the Rade Dining Hall. Both the Saint Mary of the Assumption Chapel and the Murphy Field House projects were funded and overseen by Murlan J. Murphy. In 2025, the school opened DiSanto Hall, a $40 million(US), 80 thousand sq.ft. facility housing a visual arts center, learning spaces, and a new athletic suite. School officials estimate 95% of the organization's 1,400 students will have class in the new building

From 1904 to 1917 Saint Ignatius operated a summer retreat and science campus, in Vermilion, known as Loyola-on-the-Lake.

== Academics ==
The school was recognized by the United States Department of Education as a "Blue Ribbon School" for the 1984–1985 and 2008–2009 school years.

== Fine arts program ==
In 1990, a fine arts program was added to the school's curriculum. The school also added the Breen Center for the Performing Arts. Musical opportunities include the Wildcat Marching Band, Pep Band, Stage Band, Chorus, Steel Drum Band, Jazz Band, and Liturgical Musicians.

== Clubs and activities ==
Saint Ignatius boasts nearly 100 extra-curricular clubs and student groups, ranging from the student-led yearbook (The Ignatian) to Billiards Club. Some activities meet daily while others meet less than monthly.

== Athletic program ==
Saint Ignatius' athletic teams are known as the Wildcats and compete as an independent in the Ohio High School Athletic Association (OHSAA), at the Division I level. Through the 2023–24 school year, the Wildcats have won 58 state championships across eleven sports teams, highlighted by their 13 state titles in soccer, including six consecutive titles from 2019-2024. Both the overall total of 13 and the six-year streak are the most in OHSAA history for soccer, and the school's 58 state championships rank third overall in boys' athletic titles.

=== State championships ===
- Football - 1988, 1989, 1991, 1992, 1993, 1994, 1995, 1999, 2001, 2008, 2011
- Boys' cross country - 1993, 1994, 2009, 2015
- Rugby - 2014, 2015, 2017, 2018, 2019, 2021, 2022**, 2023, 2024, 2025**, 2026
- Wrestling - 1988
- Ice hockey - 2000, 2010, 2014*, 2016, 2017, 2018, 2019, 2024
- Boys' volleyball - 2017, 2025
- Boys' basketball – 2001, 2024
- Boys' golf - 2001, 2002, 2021, 2022
- Boys' track and field - 2001, 2016
- Baseball - 2002, 2019
- Boys' soccer - 2004, 2005, 2008, 2010, 2011, 2014, 2015, 2016, 2019, 2020, 2021, 2022, 2023, 2024
- Boys' Lacrosse - 2017, 2018

_{* Co-champs}

_{** National Champions}

The inventor of the face mask, Ralph Vince, coached the football team to its first city championship, in 1925.

== Other extracurricular achievements ==
- Ohio High School Speech League State Champions in Policy Debate - 2001, 2004, 2006, 2012, 2013, 2014, 2021, and 2026
- The Model United Nations team was ranked among Ohio's top 4 schools and among North America's top 150 schools during the 2013–2014 school year.
- The Moot Court team won the Ohio Center for Law-Related Education's state moot court championship in 2024.

== See also ==
- List of Jesuit sites
