= List of OHSAA football champions =

The Ohio High School Athletic Association (OHSAA) is the governing body of athletic programs for junior and senior high schools in the state of Ohio. It conducts state championship competitions in all the OHSAA-sanctioned sports.

== Champions ==
| Year | Division I | Division II | Division III | Division IV | Division V | Division VI | Division VII |
|---|---|---|---|---|---|---|---|
| 2025 | Olentangy Orange | Avon | Columbus Bishop Watterson | Cleveland Glenville | Liberty Center | Kirtland | St. Henry |
| 2024 | Olentangy Liberty | Avon | Columbus Bishop Watterson | Indian Valley | Ironton | Coldwater | Maria Stein Marion Local |
| 2023 | Lakewood St. Edward | Massillon Washington | Toledo Central Catholic | Cleveland Glenville | Perry | Kirtland | Maria Stein Marion Local |
| 2022 | Lakewood St. Edward | Toledo Central Catholic | Canfield | Cleveland Glenville | South Range | Maria Stein Marion Local | New Bremen |
| 2021 | Lakewood St. Edward | Cincinnati Winton Woods | Chardon | Clarksville Clinton-Massie | Versailles | Carey | Maria Stein Marion Local |
| 2020 | Cincinnati St. Xavier | Akron Archbishop Hoban | Chardon | Van Wert | Kirtland | Coldwater | New Bremen |
| 2019 | Pickerington Central | Cincinnati La Salle | Trotwood-Madison | Clyde | Kirtland | Anna | Maria Stein Marion Local |
| 2018 | Lakewood St. Edward | Akron Archbishop Hoban | Kenston | Cincinnati Wyoming | Orrville | Kirtland | McComb |
| 2017 | Pickerington Central | Akron Archbishop Hoban | Trotwood-Madison | Steubenville | Wheelersburg | Maria Stein Marion Local | Minster |
| 2016 | Cincinnati St. Xavier | Cincinnati La Salle | Akron Archbishop Hoban | Columbus Bishop Hartley | Central Catholic | Maria Stein Marion Local | Warren John F. Kennedy |
| 2015 | Lakewood St. Edward | Cincinnati La Salle | Akron Archbishop Hoban | Columbus Bishop Hartley | Coldwater | Kirtland | Fort Recovery |
| 2014 | Lakewood St. Edward | Cincinnati La Salle | Toledo Central Catholic | Cleveland Benedictine | Coldwater | Minster | Maria Stein Marion Local |
| 2013 | Cincinnati Archbishop Moeller | Loveland | Akron St. Vincent-St. Mary | Clarksville Clinton-Massie | Coldwater | Kirtland | Maria Stein Marion Local |
| 2012 | Cincinnati Archbishop Moeller | Toledo Central Catholic | Akron St. Vincent-St. Mary | Clarksville Clinton-Massie | Coldwater | Maria Stein Marion Local | |
| 2011 | Cleveland St. Ignatius | Trotwood-Madison | Youngstown Cardinal Mooney | Creston Norwayne | Kirtland | Maria Stein Marion Local | |
| 2010 | Lakewood St. Edward | Maple Heights | Columbus Bishop Watterson | Columbus Bishop Hartley | Youngstown Ursuline | Delphos St. John's | |
| 2009 | Hilliard Davidson | Cincinnati Winton Woods | Youngstown Cardinal Mooney | Kettering Archbishop Alter | Youngstown Ursuline | Norwalk St. Paul | |
| 2008 | Cleveland St. Ignatius | Sylvania Southview | Aurora | Kettering Archbishop Alter | Youngstown Ursuline | Delphos St. John's | |
| 2007 | Cincinnati St. Xavier | Cincinnati Anderson | Sunbury Big Walnut | Coldwater | Maria Stein Marion Local | Newark Catholic | |
| 2006 | Hilliard Davidson | Piqua | Steubenville | Youngstown Cardinal Mooney | St. Henry | Maria Stein Marion Local | |
| 2005 | Cincinnati St. Xavier | Toledo Central Catholic | Steubenville | Coldwater | Hamler Patrick Henry | Delphos St. John's | |
| 2004 | Cincinnati Colerain | Columbus Brookhaven | Cleveland Benedictine | Youngstown Cardinal Mooney | St. Henry | Hardin Northern | |
| 2003 | Cincinnati Elder | Avon Lake | Cleveland Benedictine | Versailles | Gahanna Columbus Academy | Columbus Grove | |
| 2002 | Cincinnati Elder | Dayton Chaminade-Julienne | Columbus Bishop Watterson | Kenton | Marion Pleasant | Mogadore | |
| 2001 | Cleveland St. Ignatius | Toledo St. Francis De Sales | Mentor Lake Catholic | Kenton | Bedford St. Peter Chanel | Maria Stein Marion Local | |
| 2000 | Upper Arlington | Olmsted Falls | Central Catholic | Youngstown Ursuline | Amanda-Clearcreek | Maria Stein Marion Local | |
| 1999 | Cleveland St. Ignatius | Cuyahoga Falls Walsh Jesuit | Poland Seminary | Perkins | Amanda-Clearcreek | Delphos St. John's | |
| 1998 | Canton McKinley | Lebanon | Columbus St. Francis De Sales | Orrville | Versailles | Delphos St. John's | |
| 1997 | Canton McKinley | Defiance | Columbus St. Francis De Sales | Germantown Valley View | Liberty Center | Delphos St. John's | |
| 1996 | Lima Senior | Fostoria | Cleveland Benedictine | Germantown Valley View | Marion Pleasant | Mogadore | |
| 1995 | Cleveland St. Ignatius | Dublin Scioto | Clyde | Versailles | Lisbon David Anderson | St. Henry | |
| 1994 | Cleveland St. Ignatius | Chardon | Beloit West Branch | Germantown Valley View | Versailles | St. Henry | |
| 1993 | Cleveland St. Ignatius | St. Marys Memorial | Wauseon | Versailles | Steubenville Catholic Central | | |
| 1992 | Cleveland St. Ignatius | St. Marys Memorial | Mentor Lake Catholic | Cincinnati Academy of Physical Education | St. Henry | | |
| 1991 | Cleveland St. Ignatius | Fostoria | Mentor Lake Catholic | Warren John F. Kennedy | Newark Catholic | | |
| 1990 | Warren G. Harding | St. Marys Memorial | Hamilton Badin | Versailles | St. Henry | | |
| 1989 | Cleveland St. Ignatius | Cleveland St. Joseph | Ironton | Wheelersburg | Minster | | |
| 1988 | Cleveland St. Ignatius | Akron Buchtel | Akron St. Vincent-St. Mary | Central Catholic | Archbold | | |
| 1987 | Cincinnati Princeton | Akron Buchtel | Youngstown Cardinal Mooney | Gahanna Columbus Academy | Newark Catholic | | |
| 1986 | Fairfield | Cincinnati Purcell Marian | Cincinnati Academy of Physical Education | Columbus Bishop Hartley | Newark Catholic | | |
| 1985 | Cincinnati Archbishop Moeller | Galion | Columbus St. Francis De Sales | Cincinnati Academy of Physical Education | Newark Catholic | | |
| 1984 | Toledo St. Francis De Sales | Steubenville | Elyria Catholic | Louisville St. Thomas Aquinas | Newark Catholic | | |
| 1983 | Cincinnati Princeton | Brecksville-Broadview Heights | Elyria Catholic | Columbus Bishop Ready | McComb | | |
| 1982 | Cincinnati Archbishop Moeller | Youngstown Cardinal Mooney | Akron St. Vincent-St. Mary | West Jefferson | Newark Catholic | | |
| 1981 | Canton McKinley | Cleveland Benedictine | Akron St. Vincent-St. Mary | Nelsonville-York | Tiffin Calvert | | |
| 1980 | Cincinnati Archbishop Moeller | Youngstown Cardinal Mooney | Cleveland Benedictine | Garfield Heights Trinity | Tiffin Calvert | | |
| 1979 | Cincinnati Archbishop Moeller | | Ironton | | Mogadore | | |
| 1978 | Cincinnati Princeton | | Brookfield | | Newark Catholic | | |
| 1977 | Cincinnati Archbishop Moeller | | Cincinnati Wyoming | | Crooksville | | |
| 1976 | Cincinnati Archbishop Moeller | | Elyria Catholic | | West Jefferson | | |
| 1975 | Cincinnati Archbishop Moeller | | Parma Heights Holy Name | | Carey | | |
| 1974 | Warren Warren G. Harding | | Norwalk | | Middletown Bishop Fenwick | | |
| 1973 | Youngstown Cardinal Mooney | | Cleveland Benedictine | | Middletown Bishop Fenwick | | |
| 1972 | Warren Western Reserve | | Akron St. Vincent-St. Mary | | Marion Pleasant | | |

== Pre-1972 state champions ==
Prior to 1972, high schools within Ohio were awarded state championships through the Associated Press or through popular acclaim. champions were determined by popular acclaim until 1946, and the AP until 1971. The OHSAA did not officially recognize these state championships until 2012.

=== Associated Press poll state champions ===
| Year | Class AAA | Class AA | Class A | All classes |
|---|---|---|---|---|
| 1971 | Warren G. Harding | Steubenville Catholic Central | Marion Pleasant | |
| 1970 | Massillon Washington | New Lexington | Portsmouth Notre Dame | |
| 1969 | | Upper Arlington | Norwalk St. Paul | |
| 1968 | | Upper Arlington | Newark Catholic | |
| 1967 | | Upper Arlington | Portsmouth Notre Dame | |
| 1966 | | Columbus Bishop Watterson | Marion Catholic | |
| 1965 | | Massillon Washington | Dover St. Joseph | |
| 1964 | | | | Massillon Washington |
| 1963 | | | | Niles McKinley |
| 1962 | | | | Toledo Central Catholic |
| 1961 | | | | Niles McKinley |
| 1960 | | | | Massillon Washington |
| 1959 | | | | Massillon Washington |
| 1958 | | | | Alliance |
| 1957 | | | | Cleveland Benedictine |
| 1956 | | | | Canton McKinley |
| 1955 | | | | Canton McKinley |
| 1954 | | | | Massillon Washington |
| 1953 | | | | Massillon Washington |
| 1952 | | | | Massillon Washington |
| 1951 | | | | Massillon Washington |
| 1950 | | | | Massillon Washington |
| 1949 | | | | Massillon Washington |
| 1948 | | | | Massillon Washington |
| 1947 | | | | Barberton |

=== Popular acclaim state champions ===
| Year | Champions |
|---|---|
| 1946 | Cleveland Cathedral Latin/Lima Central* |
| 1945 | Cleveland Cathedral Latin/Toledo Waite/Canton Lincoln* |
| 1944 | Cleveland Cathedral Latin/Canton McKinley* |
| 1943 | Massillon Washington |
| 1942 | Canton McKinley |
| 1941 | Massillon Washington/Martins Ferry/Mansfield* |
| 1940 | Massillon Washington |
| 1939 | Massillon Washington/Toledo Waite/Hamilton* |
| 1938 | Massillon Washington |
| 1937 | Massillon Washington |
| 1936 | Massillon Washington |
| 1935 | Massillon Washington |
| 1934 | Canton McKinley |
| 1933 | Springfield/Dover* |
| 1932 | Toledo Waite |
| 1931 | Steubenville Wells |
| 1930 | Steubenville/Lorain* |
| 1929 | None named |
| 1928 | None named |
| 1927 | Cleveland Cathedral Latin/Canton McKinley* |
| 1926 | Steubenville |
| 1925 | Findlay/Steubenville* |
| 1924 | Toledo Waite |
| 1923 | Toledo Scott/East Cleveland Shaw* |
| 1922 | Toledo Scott/Massillon Washington* |
| 1921 | None named |
| 1920 | Canton McKinley/Cleveland East Technical* |
| 1919 | Toledo Scott |
| 1918 | Toledo Scott |
| 1917 | None named |
| 1916 | Toledo Scott/Massillon Washington* |
| 1915 | Fostoria |
| 1914 | Fostoria/Bellaire/Lisbon David Anderson* |
| 1913 | None named |
| 1912 | Fostoria |
| 1911 | Fostoria/Akron Central |
| 1910 | Fostoria |
| 1909 | Massillon Washington |
| 1908 | None named |
| 1907 | Fostoria |
| 1906 | Fostoria |
| 1905 | None named |
| 1904 | Toledo Central |
| 1903 | Kenyon Military Academy |
| 1902 | Fostoria |
| 1901 | Youngstown Rayen/Toledo Central* |
| 1900 | Oberlin/Youngstown Rayen/Cleveland Central* |
| 1899 | Oberlin |
| 1898 | None named |
| 1897 | None named |
| 1896 | Sandusky |
| 1895 | Cleveland Central |

*Tie

== See also ==
- List of Ohio High School Athletic Association championships
- List of high schools in Ohio
- Ohio High School Athletic Conferences
- Ohio High School Athletic Association
