= Ohio Stadium =

Football stadium on the campus of the Ohio State University in Columbus, Ohio

- "The Horseshoe" "The Shoe" "The House That Harley Built"
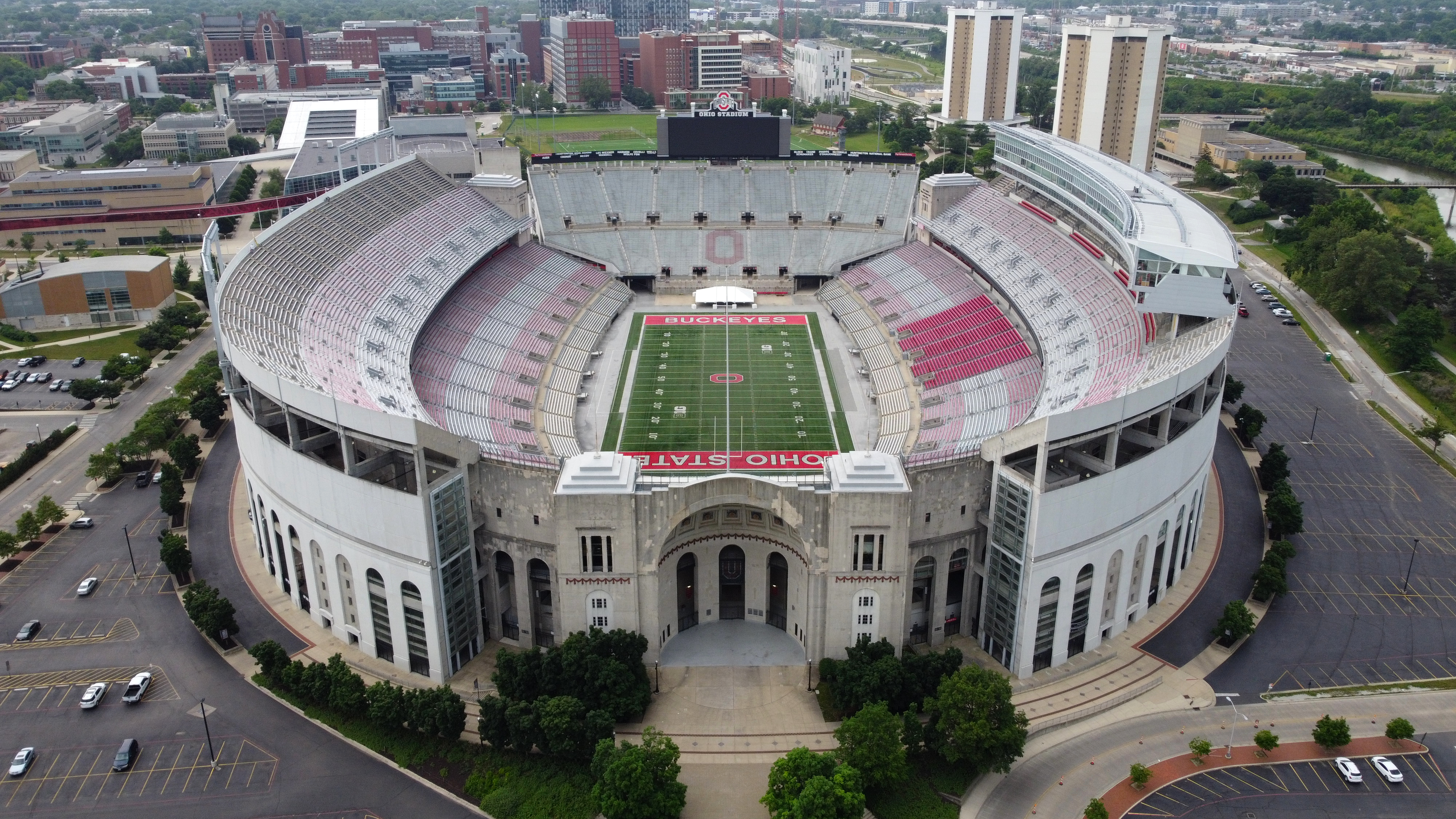
- Ohio Stadium in June 2021
- Interactive map of Ohio Stadium
- Address: 411 Woody Hayes Drive
- Location: Columbus, Ohio
- Coordinates: 40°0′6″N 83°1′11″W
- Owner: Ohio State University
- Operator: Ohio State University; Department of Athletics
- Capacity: 102,780 (since 2019)
- Surface: Shaw Sports Momentum Pro (2022–present); FieldTurf (2007–2022); AstroTurf (1971–1989); Grass (1922–1970, 1990–2006)
- Record attendance: 110,045 (November 26, 2016 vs. Michigan)

Construction
- Groundbreaking: August 3, 1921
- Opened: October 7, 1922
- Renovated: 2000–01
- Expanded: 1948, 1991, 2001, 2014
- Cost: US$1.34 million ($25.8 million in 2025 dollars)
- Architects: Howard Dwight Smith; Class of 1907
- General contractor: E. H. Latham Company

Tenants
- Ohio State Buckeyes (NCAA) 1922–present Ohio Glory (WLAF) 1992; Columbus Crew (MLS) 1996–1998

Website
- ohiostatebuckeyes.com/sports/2023/6/2/ohio-stadium
- Ohio Stadium
- U.S. National Register of Historic Places
- NRHP reference No.: 74001494
- Added to NRHP: March 22, 1974

Ohio Stadium is an American football stadium in Columbus, Ohio, on the campus of Ohio State University. It primarily serves as the home venue of the Ohio State Buckeyes football team and is also the site for the university's Spring Commencement ceremonies each May. Common nicknames for the stadium include "The Horseshoe", "The Shoe", and "The House That Harley Built".

From 1996 to 1998, Ohio Stadium was the home venue for the Columbus Crew of Major League Soccer prior to the opening of Columbus Crew Stadium in 1999. The stadium also was the home venue for the OSU track and field teams from 1923 to 2001. In addition to athletics, Ohio Stadium is also a concert venue, with U2, Taylor Swift, The Rolling Stones, Genesis, Pink Floyd, and Metallica among the many acts to have played at the venue.

The stadium opened in 1922 as a replacement for Ohio Field and had a seating capacity of 66,210. In 1923, a cinder running track was added that was later upgraded to an all-weather track. Seating capacity gradually increased over the years and reached a total of 91,470 possible spectators in 1991. Beginning in 2000, the stadium was renovated and expanded in several phases, removing the track and adding additional seating, which raised the capacity to 101,568 by 2001 and to 102,329 in 2007. In 2014, additional seating was added in the end zone, raising the official capacity to 104,944. Another renovation to add more luxury suites began in 2017 and will eventually lead to a decrease of 2,600 seats. It is the largest stadium by capacity in the state of Ohio, and the third largest on-campus football stadium in the United States. Ohio Stadium was added to the National Register of Historic Places in 1974.

== Construction ==
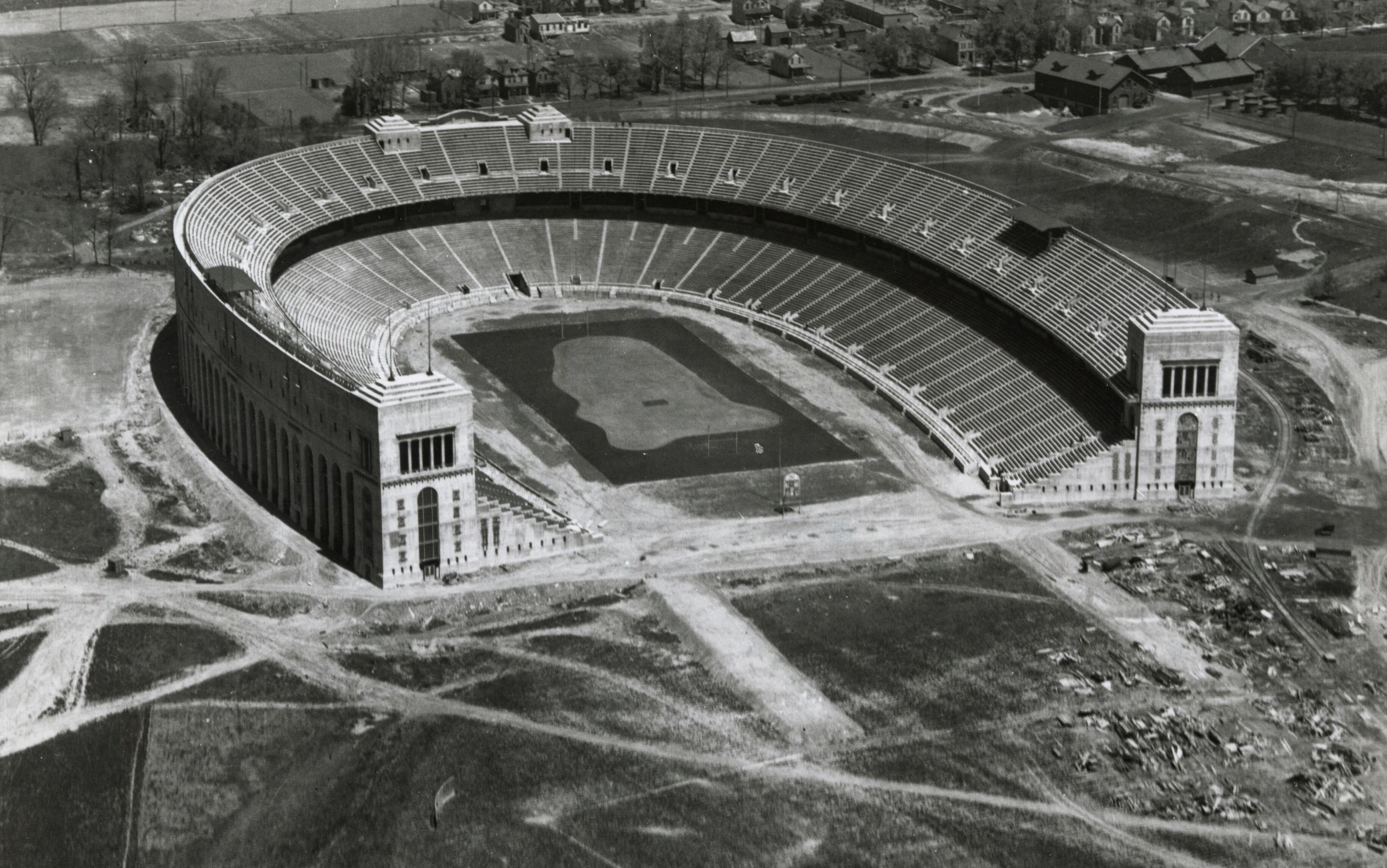
Ohio Stadium near the end of construction

As early as 1913, Ohio Field at High Street and Woodruff Avenue was unable to contain the crowds attracted to many Buckeye home football games. This led to faculty discussion of moving the site elsewhere and building a new facility. The growing popularity of football in Ohio led to the design of a horseshoe-shaped stadium, conceptualized and designed by architect Howard Dwight Smith in 1918. A public-subscription Stadium Campaign to fund the project began in October 1920 and raised over $1.1 million in pledges by January 1921, of which $975,001 were actually honored.

The stadium was built in 1922 by E. H. Latham Company of Columbus, with materials and labor from the Marble Cliff Quarry Co. at a construction cost of $1.34 million and a total cost of $1.49 million. The stadium's original capacity was 66,210. Upon completion, it was the largest poured concrete structure in the world. Many university officials feared that the stadium would never be filled to capacity.

Smith employed numerous revolutionary architectural techniques while building the stadium. At the base is a slurry wall to keep out the waters from the Olentangy River; the stadium rests on the flood plain. Instead of building a large bowl like the previously constructed Yale Bowl, Ohio Stadium was designed to have an upper deck that would hang over part of the lower deck, giving Ohio Stadium its "A", "B", and "C" decks. Instead of employing numerous columns like those at Harvard Stadium, Smith designed double columns that allow for more space between columns. The rotunda at the north end of the stadium, which is now adorned with stained glass murals of the offensive and defensive squads that comprise the Buckeye football team, was designed to look like the dome at the Pantheon in Rome.

== History ==
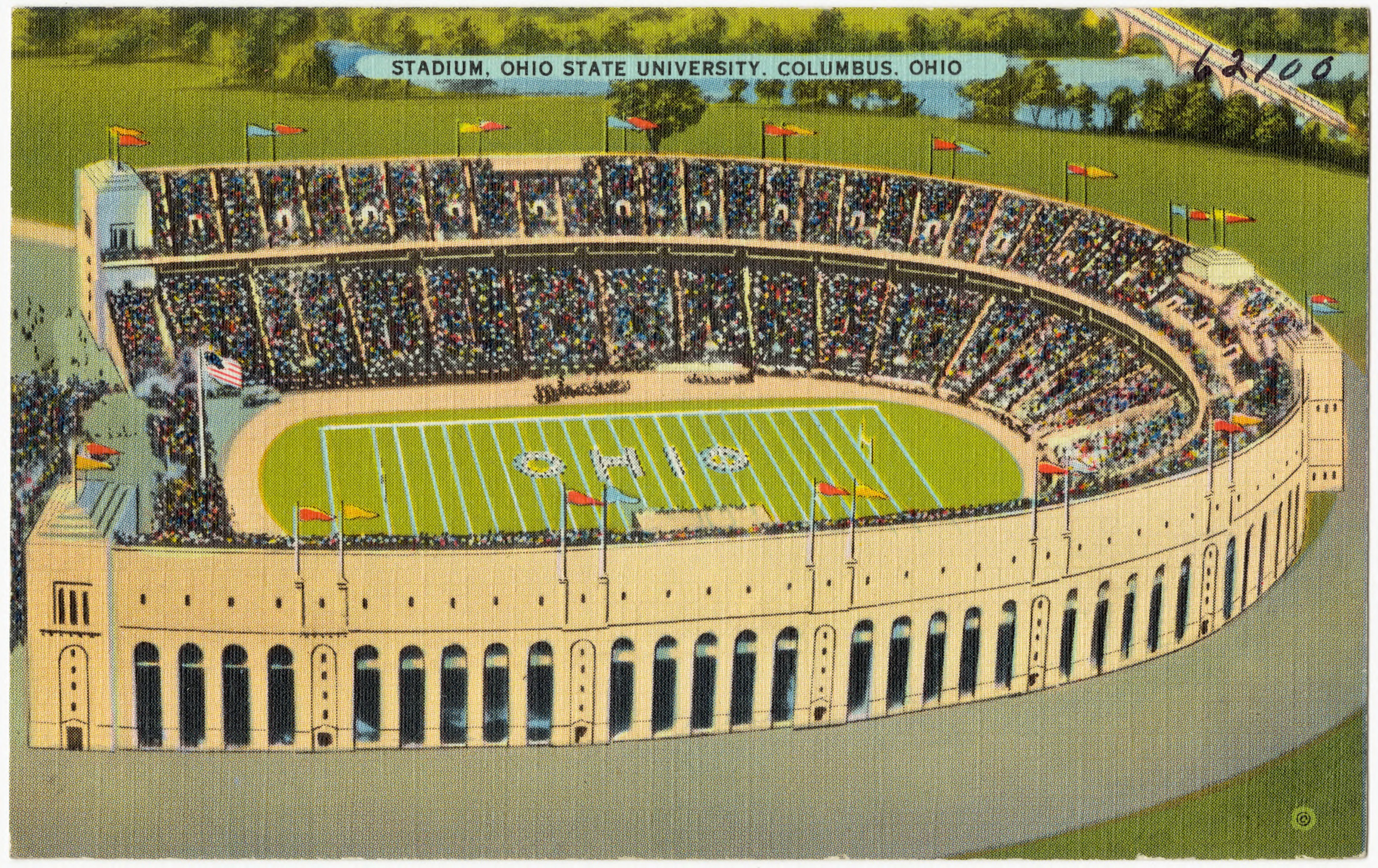
Postcard of Ohio Stadium c. 1930–45

The first game in the stadium was against Ohio Wesleyan University on October 7, 1922, and brought a crowd of around 25,000, which left people concerned because the stadium was half empty. This concern was put to rest at the stadium's formal dedication against Michigan on October 21, which the Wolverines won, 19–0. The crowd was announced at the game to be 72,000, but no one is really sure how many people made it into the stadium. This attendance mark was broken in a game against Michigan in 1926 when 90,411 came out to support the Buckeyes; this is also the last time standing-room-only tickets were sold for a game.

The stadium did not regularly sell out until after World War II, and in the 1920s and 1930s most games only drew in 20,000 or 30,000 fans with many more attending the annual game against Michigan. The 1935 contest with Notre Dame was a sellout, with over 81,000 in attendance.

In 1923, a cinder track was built around the football field, which would later be named after Olympian and Ohio State athlete Jesse Owens. The stadium was home to the OSU track and field teams until the opening of Jesse Owens Memorial Stadium in 2001.

=== Renovations ===
As time passed, minor adjustments raised the seating capacity to more than 90,000. In 1984, a new $2.1 million scoreboard was installed. The stadium was heavily renovated from 1998 to 2001. The press box was replaced, additional seating was installed, and 81 luxury suites and 2,500 club seats were added. The south end zone scoreboard was also replaced by a 90-by-30-foot (27.4 m × 9.1 m) video board that is able to show replays, highlights, animations, graphics and statistical information. Additionally, a smaller version of the south end scoreboard was added to the north end and a new LED ribbon board that runs end-zone to end-zone was added to the balcony prior to the 2009 season. In 1998, the track was removed and a 45-foot (14 m) slurry wall was built underneath the field to allow it to be lowered 14.5 feet (4.4 m), which places it below the water table. After the 1999 season, the field of play was lowered to add seating closer to the field. The temporary bleachers in the south end zone were replaced with permanent seating. However, the south end of the stadium remains partially open, thus allowing the stadium to maintain its notable horseshoe configuration. General improvements were made in the seating and concourse areas. The result of the $194 million renovation was a capacity that rose to 101,568. 80% of the cost of the renovation was funded by the sale of leases on the suites and club seats, with the remaining 20% funded by donations and the sale of naming rights for portions of the stadium. No public or university money was spent in the renovation process.

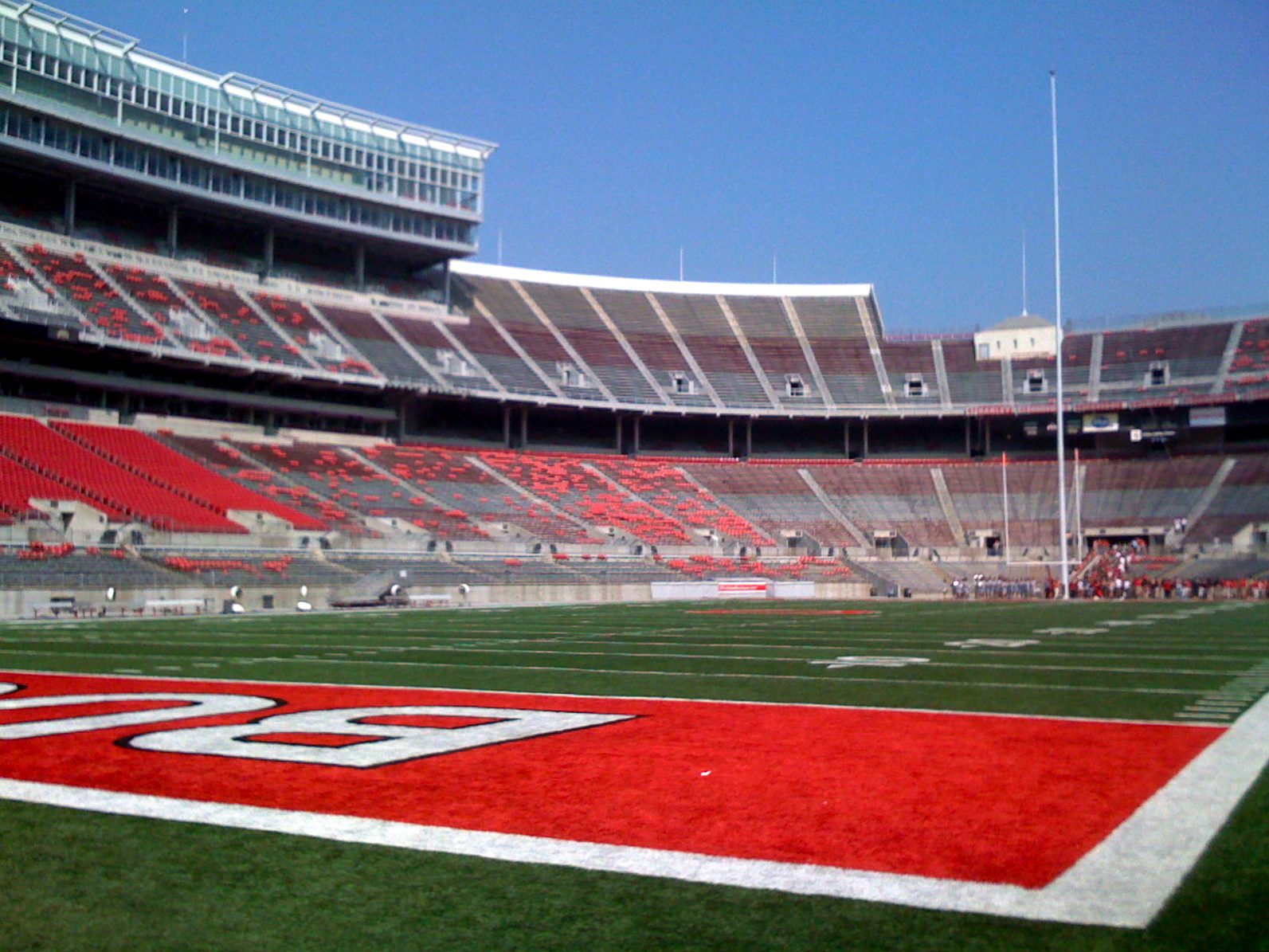
Stadium endzone in 2009

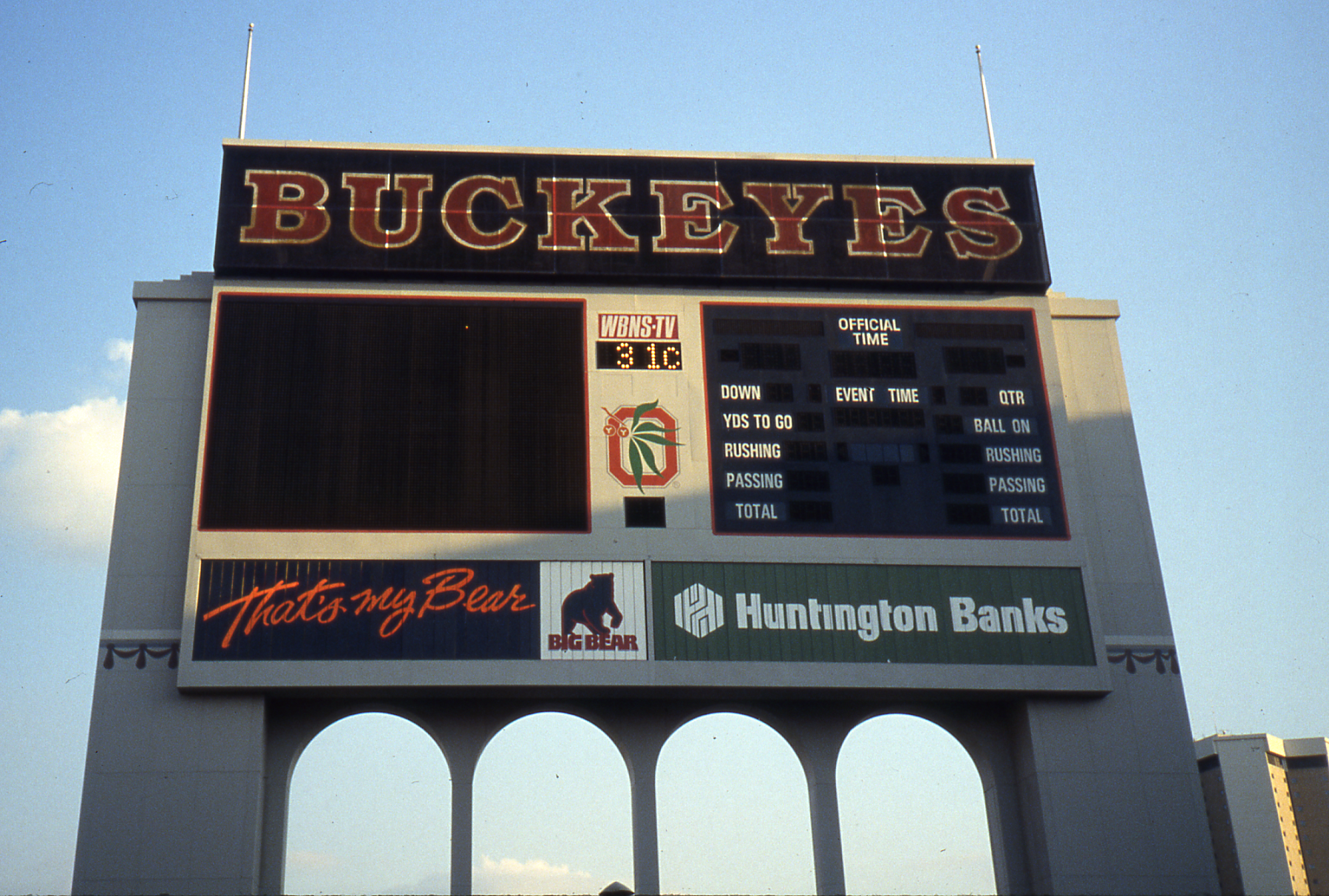
Scoreboard as seen in 1987

In 1971, the natural grass field was removed, and AstroTurf was installed, compliments of a donation by Lou Fisher in dedication to fellow football player Joseph Campanella. A plaque was placed on the southeast corner in memory of Campanella. In 1979, the surface was replaced with SuperTurf. In 1990, natural grass made its return to the Horseshoe, in the form of a special grass called "Prescription Athletic Turf." New field designs were put in place for the 1992 season and existed through the 2006 season. During the 2006 season, problems with the natural grass began to arise. After serious damage to the field during use in the spring of 2006, the field never recovered and had to be re-sodded. That grass never took root because of bad weather, and the university was forced to re-sod the field again only three weeks after the old sod was laid. The university spent approximately $150,000 to perform both soddings. In response to this, OSU replaced the natural grass with FieldTurf for the 2007 season. This new artificial turf looks and feels like real grass but requires minimal upkeep.

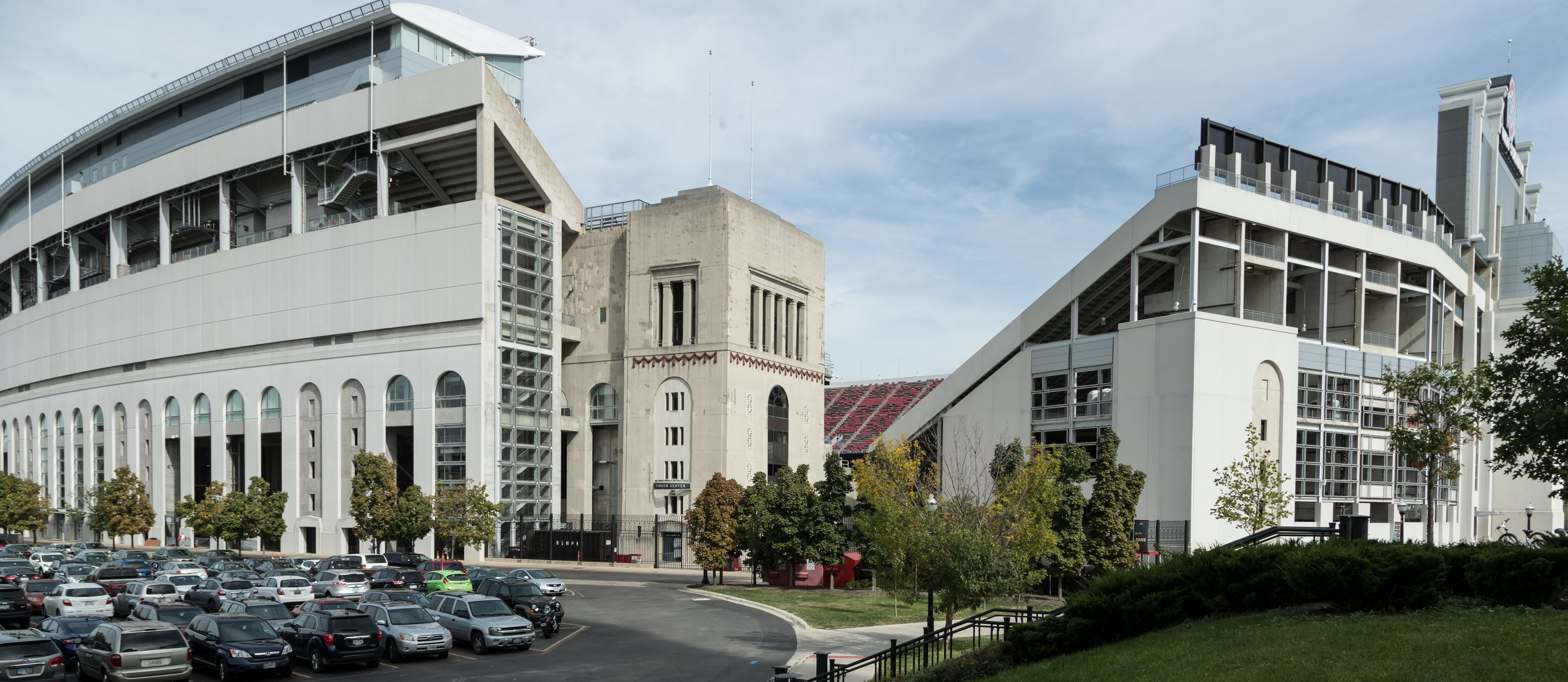
Stadium exterior in August 2020

In March 2012 the university announced a $7 million renovation to the scoreboard installed during the 2000–01 renovation. The project began April 23 and was completed in time for the 2012 season opener on September 1. The current scoreboard includes a Panasonic HD screen, stretching 124 by 42 feet (38 by 13 m), and incorporates upgrades to the audio system and the LED running boards (which are the smaller screens underneath the larger screen that usually display score updates and advertisements). A Pro Sound audio system with 25 different speakers flank the scoreboard. Older speakers throughout the Horseshoe received improvements and will eventually be replaced by new speakers fitted into the existing framework.

Prior to the 2014 season, 2,500 seats were added to the south stands. These seats were built over the entrance tunnels and raised the official capacity of the stadium to 104,851, making it the third largest stadium in the country and the fourth largest stadium in the world. The renovations also included permanent lights added to the northeast and southeast corners of the stadium, as well as atop the press box, and the playing surface was replaced.

=== Field name ===
The playing surface at Ohio Stadium is known as Safelite Field, named for Columbus-based Safelite, a glass repair company. The naming rights deal was announced August 26, 2022, and allows the company’s logos to be displayed on the field. The name of the facility, however, did not change.

=== Timeline of seating capacity ===
Ohio Stadium in 2021

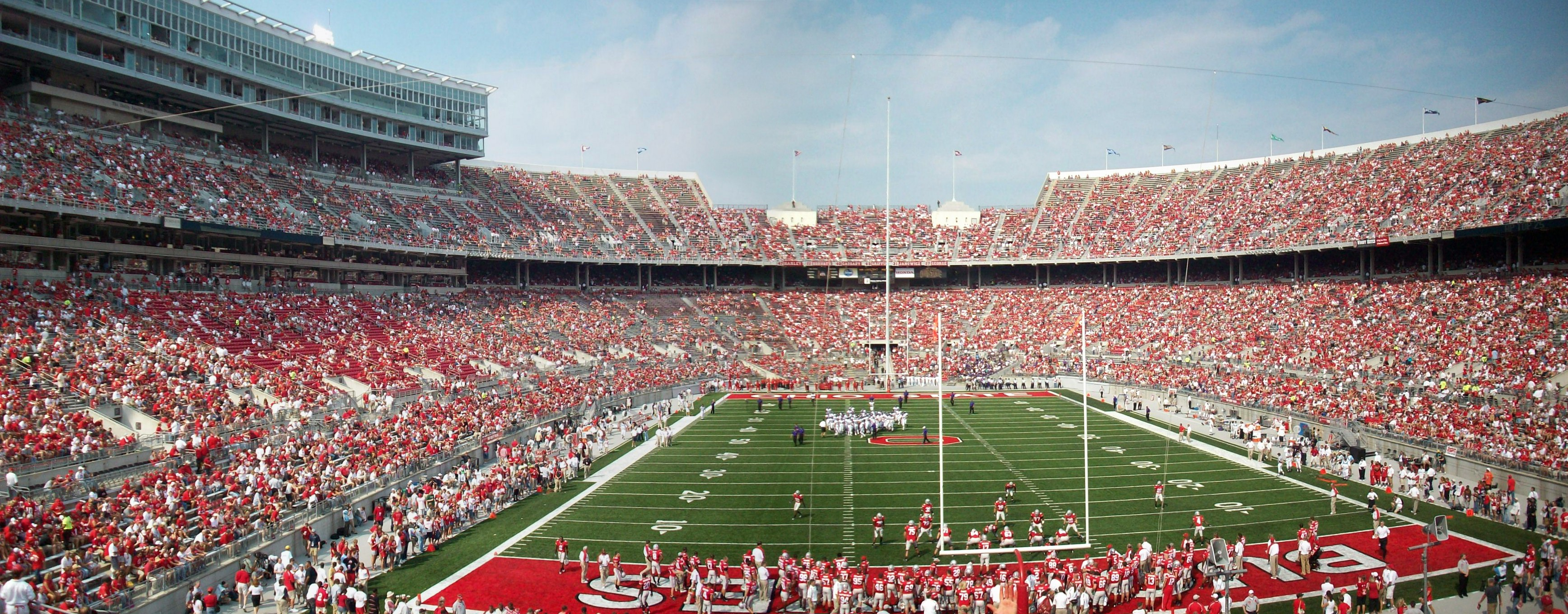
Panoramic view during a football game in 2007

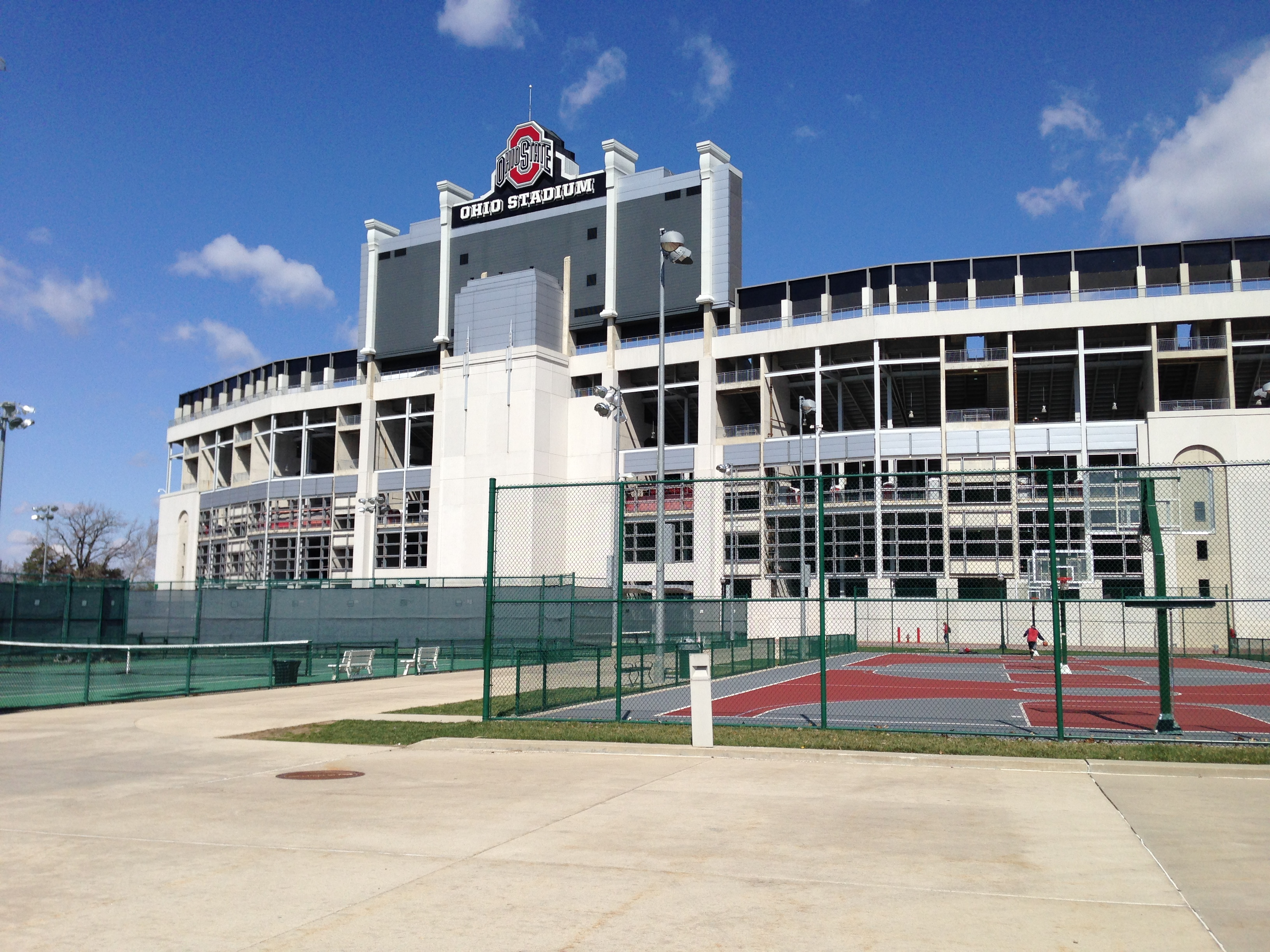
Tennis and basketball courts outside the stadium

| Capacity | Years |
|---|---|
| 66,210 | 1922–1943 |
| 72,754 | 1944–1947 |
| 78,677 | 1948–1957 |
| 79,658 | 1958–1960 |
| 79,727 | 1961 |
| 81,109 | 1962–1968 |
| 81,455 | 1969–1970 |
| 81,475 | 1971 |
| 81,667 | 1972 |
| 82,567 | 1973 |
| 83,080 | 1974 |
| 83,112 | 1975–1981 |
| 85,290 | 1982–1984 |
| 85,399 | 1985–1988 |
| 86,071 | 1989–1990 |
| 91,470 | 1991–1994 |
| 89,841 | 1995–1999 |
| 95,346 | 2000 |
| 101,568 | 2001–2006 |
| 102,329 | 2007–2014 |
| 104,944 | 2014–2017 |
| 102,082 | 2018 |
| 102,780 | 2019–present |

=== Night football games ===
Before the 2014 renovations, Ohio Stadium did not have permanent lights at the stadium, thus night games were rare. Ohio State's first night game in the stadium was played on September 14, 1985, when the #9 Buckeyes defeated the Pittsburgh Panthers, 10–7. Ohio State did not play another night game at Ohio Stadium until September 11, 1993, when the 16th-ranked Buckeyes defeated #12 Washington 21–12. Ohio State played a total of 12 more night games before permanent lighting was installed, nine of which were against ranked opponents.

Below is a table of teams the Buckeyes have faced in multiple night games at Ohio Stadium.

| Matchups | Opponent | OSU Record |
|---|---|---|
| 3 | Penn State | 2–1 |
| 2 | Nebraska | 2–0 |
| 2 | Washington | 2–0 |
| 2 | Wisconsin | 2–0 |

=== Largest attendance ===
| Rank | Date | Attendance | Result |
|---|---|---|---|
| 1 | November 26, 2016 | 110,045 | #2 Ohio State 30 – #3 Michigan 27 (2 OT) |
| 2 | October 28, 2017 | 109,302 | #6 Ohio State 39 - #2 Penn State 38 |
| 3 | September 9, 2017 | 109,088 | #5 Oklahoma 31 – #2 Ohio State 16 |
| 4 | November 21, 2015 | 108,975 | #9 Michigan State 17 – #3 Ohio State 14 |
| 5 | November 5, 2016 | 108,750 | #6 Ohio State 62 – #10 Nebraska 3 |
| 6 | November 29, 2014 | 108,610 | #6 Ohio State 42 – Michigan 28 |
| 7 | October 17, 2015 | 108,423 | #1 Ohio State 38 – Penn State 10 |
| 8 | September 16, 2017 | 108,414 | #8 Ohio State 38 – Army 7 |
| 9 | September 27, 2014 | 108,362 | #22 Ohio State 50 – Cincinnati 28 |
| 10 | November 7, 2015 | 108,075 | #3 Ohio State 28 – Minnesota 14 |

=== 2024 commencement death ===
On May 5, 2024, a woman fell to her death from the stands atop the stadium during Ohio State's commencement ceremony. The ceremony was not stopped, and no speakers acknowledged the death.

=== 2025 suicide incident ===
On September 26, 2025, first responders were notified after the discovering of a deceased body at the northeast side of the Stadium. Several Columbus fire and Campus Police officers arrived shortly after and had blocked off the scene on the same day. The person was identified later as William Meyers, a third-year student attending the university for an accounting degree. A spokesperson of the university, Ben Johnson, gave his condolences to the family of Meyers and to the students of Ohio State. This event did not interfere with any of the stadium's scheduled events of that week, as The Ohio State Buckeyes' football team were at an away game at Washington.

== Buckeye football ==
The largest crowd in stadium history is 110,045, set November 26, 2016, in a game against Michigan. The attendance broke the previous record of 108,975 set the previous year for the game against Michigan State. Ohio State has ranked in the top five for attendance for many years, and was the national leader in attendance for the 2014 season, averaging 106,296 people per game. The school set the national spring game record on April 16, 2016, when they drew 100,189 fans for their 2016 spring game. This broke the previous record of 99,391 set by the Buckeyes in their 2015 spring game.

Mel Kiper, Jr. ranked Ohio Stadium second in atmosphere in 2002, behind the Army–Navy Game, and quoted Beano Cook in saying "There is nothing that beats when the Ohio State Marching Band and the sousaphone player dots the 'i' for Script Ohio." The crowd attending these home games is known for creating harsh and difficult environments for opponents. University of Iowa coach Hayden Fry complained after a 1985 loss that the fans were too loud for his quarterback, Chuck Long, to call plays and suggested sound meters be used to gauge the noise level, penalizing home teams if there was too much noise. He said, "It's a realistic fact that happened. He became mentally disturbed for the first time since he's been a starter for us because of his inability to communicate."

=== O-H-I-O ===
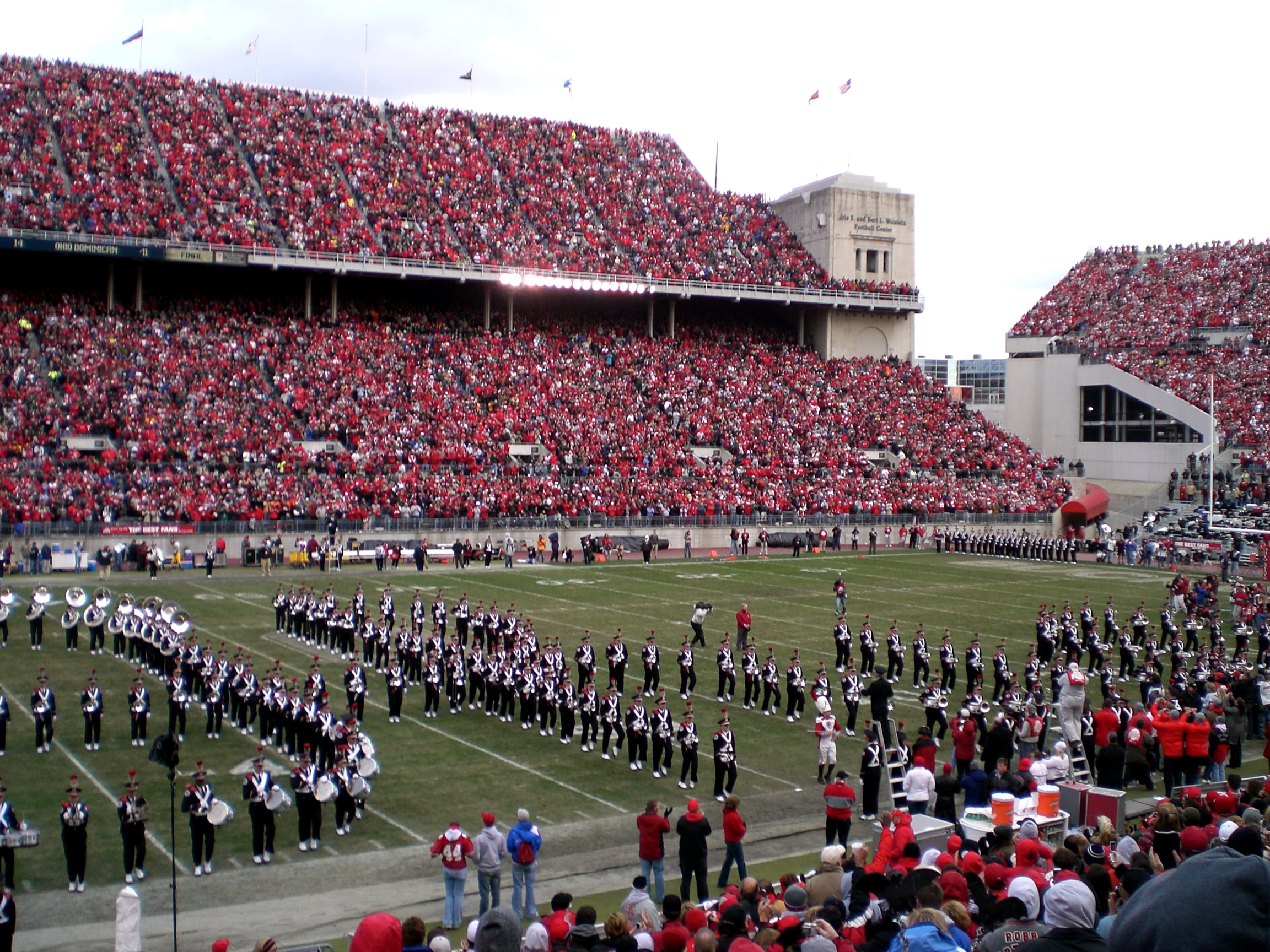
"Script Ohio"

One famous chant by the Buckeye fans, usually starting with the students in the South Stands, is O-H-I-O. The entire South end yells O then the East stands follow with H, the North with I and the West with O. The chant loops around the stadium loudly sometimes for 5 to 10 minutes. Before kickoff the entire stadium screams O continuously until the ball is kicked; immediately following the kick the stadium shouts in unison O-H-I-O.

== Events ==
=== Columbus Crew ===
Major League Soccer games were held at Ohio Stadium between 1996 and 1998. The home opener was held on April 13, 1996, against D.C. United before 25,266 fans. Brian McBride scored 2 goals and had an assist in a 4–0 rout. The field at Ohio Stadium was the smallest in the MLS, measuring only 62 yards wide by 106 yards long, limited by the track surrounding it. Because of the smaller market for soccer than Ohio State football, B Deck, C Deck, and the South end zone seats were closed, leading to a capacity of 25,243.

Attendance stayed strong through the first season, seeing a record audience of 31,550 September 15, 1996 win over the MetroStars, 2–0. Despite the facility's size, problems like field dimensions and the lack of lighting pushed the Crew to find a new home. Jamey Rootes, Crew president and general manager stated, "We prefer a smaller, more intimate environment (than Ohio Stadium) … We've got to create a major league environment. Ohio Stadium is a great stadium, but we cannot create a major league environment in a facility that is way too big for us." The Crew finished their tenure at Ohio Stadium 30–18.

=== Concerts ===
| Date | Artist(s) | Opening act(s) | Tour / Concert name | Attendance | Revenue | Notes |
|---|---|---|---|---|---|---|
| April 24, 1982 | Loverboy | — | Get Lucky Tour | — | — | |
| May 28, 1988 | Pink Floyd | — | A Momentary Lapse of Reason Tour | 63,016 / 63,016 | $1,260,320 | |
| May 22, 1992 | Genesis | — | We Can't Dance Tour | 71,550 / 71,550 | — | |
| May 29, 1994 | Pink Floyd | — | The Division Bell Tour | 75,250 / 75,250 | $2,406,920 | |
| August 6, 1994 | Billy Joel; Elton John | — | Face to Face 1994 | 67,606 / 67,606 | $2,710,335 | |
| May 24, 1997 | U2 | Fun Lovin' Criminals | PopMart Tour | 43,813 | $2,246,977 | |
| September 27, 1997 | The Rolling Stones | Blues Traveler | Bridges to Babylon Tour | 60,621 / 60,621 | $3,553,069 | |
| May 9, 1998 | George Strait | Tim McGraw; Faith Hill; John Michael Montgomery; Lee Ann Womack; Asleep at the Wheel; Lila McCann | George Strait Country Music Festival | 69,954 / 69,954 | $2,773,080 | |
| July 19, 2003 | Metallica | Mudvayne; Deftones; Linkin Park; Limp Bizkit | Summer Sanitarium Tour 2003 | 41,458 | — | |
| May 30, 2015 | The Rolling Stones | Kid Rock | Zip Code Tour | 59,038 / 59,038 | $7,911,843 | |
| August 18, 2015 | One Direction | Icona Pop | On the Road Again Tour | 31,626 / 31,626 | $2,492,794 | |
| July 7, 2018 | Taylor Swift | Camila Cabello; Charli XCX | Taylor Swift's Reputation Stadium Tour | 62,897 / 62,897 | $6,606,529 | First woman to headline a concert at the stadium. |
| August 16, 2018 | Beyoncé; Jay-Z | Chloe X Halle; DJ Khaled | On the Run II Tour | 35,083 / 35,083 | $3,142,160 | |
| August 5, 2023 | Billy Joel and Stevie Nicks | — | Two Icons - One Night 2023 | 62,136 | $11,844,632 | |
| August 8, 2023 | Def Leppard and Mötley Crüe | Alice Cooper | The World Tour | — | — | |
| August 11 & 12, 2023 | Morgan Wallen | HARDY; ERNEST; Bailey Zimmerman; Riley Green; Ian Munsick | One Night At A Time World Tour | 139,000 | $26,800,000 | |
| April 25, 2026 | Luke Combs | Thelma & James; Jake Worthington; Ty Myers; Dierks Bentley | My Kinda Saturday Night Tour | 97,367 | — | |
| May 20, 2026 | Bruno Mars | Anderson .Paak; Leon Thomas | The Romantic Tour | — | — | |
| July 15, 2026 | AC/DC | The Pretty Reckless | Power Up Tour | — | — | |
| October 17, 2026 | Twenty One Pilots | Death Cab for Cutie; Emi Grace | — | TBD | TBD | |

=== Buckeye Country Superfest ===
| Year | Day | Main act(s) | Opening act(s) | Attendance |
|---|---|---|---|---|
| 2015 | June 20 | Blake Shelton | Rascal Flatts; Lee Brice; Tyler Farr; Cassadee Pope | ~90,000 |
| 2015 | June 21 | Kenny Chesney | Keith Urban; Cole Swindell; David Nail; Parmalee | ~90,000 |
| 2016 | June 18 | Jason Aldean | Lady Antebellum; Thomas Rhett; Aaron Lewis; A Thousand Horses | |
| 2016 | June 19 | Luke Bryan | Florida Georgia Line; Dierks Bentley; Randy Houser; Jerrod Niemann; The Swon Brothers | |
| 2017 | June 10 | Keith Urban | Zac Brown Band; Kip Moore; Jana Kramer; Craig Campbell; Darrell Scott | |
| 2017 | June 11 | Kenny Chesney | Miranda Lambert; Billy Currington; Lanco; Frankie Ballard | |
| 2019 | June 8 | George Strait; Blake Shelton | Chris Janson; Midland; RaeLynn | 55,402 |
| 2022 | July 23 | Luke Combs | Cody Jinks; Zach Bryan; Kameron Marlowe; Morgan Wade | 63,000 |
| 2023 | May 27 | George Strait | Chris Stapleton; Little Big Town; Warren Zeiders; Larry Fleet | 63,891 |
| 2024 | June 22/23 | Zach Bryan | Billy Strings; Turnpike Troubadours; Charley Crockett; Charles Wesley Godwin | 127,000 |
| 2025 | June 21 | Jelly Roll; Kane Brown | Megan Moroney; Treaty Oak Revival; Dasha; Vincent Mason | 80,000 |
| 2026 | June 13 | Tyler Childers | The Red Clay Strays; Lord Huron; Sierra Ferrell; Flatland Cavalry | |

=== Classic For Columbus ===
On August 28, 2021, Ohio Stadium played host to the Classic For Columbus, which matched up two HBCUs, in Central State Marauders and Kentucky State Thorobreds. Kentucky State won 20–6 in front of approximately 20,000 fans.

=== High school ===
The stadium hosted the Ohio High School Athletic Association football championship games for all seven divisions from 2014 to 2016. The stadium had previously hosted the championships for Divisions I and III in 1982 and all divisions (five at the time) from 1983 to 1989.

OHSAA Football State Championship Games Played at Ohio Stadium
| Year | Division I | Division II | Division III | Division IV | Division V | Division VI | Division VII |
|---|---|---|---|---|---|---|---|
| 1982 | Cincinnati Archbishop Moeller 35, Massillon Washington 14 | did not host | Akron St. Vincent–St. Mary 21, Ironton 14 | did not host | did not host | Division VI created in 1994 | Division VII created in 2013 |
| 1983 | Cincinnati Princeton 24, Akron Garfield 6 | Brecksville-Broadview Heights 12, Celina 6 | Elyria Catholic 14, Urbana 9 | Columbus Bishop Ready 43, Orrville 15 | McComb 6, Newark Catholic 0 | Division VI created in 1994 | Division VII created in 2013 |
| 1984 | Toledo St. Francis de Sales 17, North Canton Hoover 14 | Steubenville 12, Whitehall-Yearling 9 (OT) | Elyria Catholic 45, Cincinnati Archbishop McNicholas 20 | Louisville St. Thomas Aquinas 23, Columbus Bishop Hartley 0 | Newark Catholic 14, Middletown Bishop Fenwick 6 | Division VI created in 1994 | Division VII created in 2013 |
| 1985 | Cincinnati Archbishop Moeller 35, Canton McKinley 11 | Galion 6, Youngstown Cardinal Mooney 0 | Columbus St. Francis DeSales 21, Orrville 13 | Cincinnati Academy of Physical Education 27, Louisville St. Thomas Aquinas 0 | Newark Catholic 19, Delphos Jefferson 0 | Division VI created in 1994 | Division VII created in 2013 |
| 1986 | Fairfield 21, Lakewood St. Edward 20 | Cincinnati Purcell Marian 26, Willoughby South 7 | Cincinnati Academy of Physical Education 7, Chagrin Falls Kenston 6 | Columbus Bishop Hartley 47, Castalia Margaretta 0 | Newark Catholic 28, Defiance Ayersville 27 | Division VI created in 1994 | Division VII created in 2013 |
| 1987 | Cincinnati Princeton 14, Youngstown Boardman 7 | Akron Buchtel 26, Steubenville 14 | Youngstown Cardinal Mooney 30, Thornville Sheridan 7 | Gahanna Columbus Academy 21, Gates Mills Hawken 0 | Newark Catholic 16, Mogadore 13 | Division VI created in 1994 | Division VII created in 2013 |
| 1988 | Cleveland St. Ignatius 10, Cincinnati Princeton 7 | Akron Buchtel 28, Steubenville 21 (2OT) | Akron St. Vincent–St. Mary 14, Ironton 12 | Canton Central Catholic 21, Versailles 6 | Archbold 42, Mogadore 14 | Division VI created in 1994 | Division VII created in 2013 |
| 1989 | Cleveland St. Ignatius 34, Cincinnati Archbishop Moeller 28 | Cleveland St. Joseph 21, Fostoria 14 | Ironton 12, Campbell Memorial 7 | Wheelersburg 14, Warren John F. Kennedy 7 | Minster 16, McDonald 7 | Division VI created in 1994 | Division VII created in 2013 |
| 2014 | Lakewood St. Edward 31, Huber Heights Wayne 21 | Cincinnati La Salle 55, Macedonia Nordonia 20 | Toledo Central Catholic 56, The Plains Athens 52 | Cleveland Benedictine 21, Kettering Archbishop Alter 14 | Coldwater 62, Canton Central Catholic 21 | Minster 46, Kirtland 42 | Maria Stein Marian Local 41, Norwalk St. Paul 0 |
| 2015 | Lakewood St. Edward 45, Huber Heights Wayne 35 | Cincinnati La Salle 42, Massillon Perry 0 | Akron Archbishop Hoban 33, Toledo Central Catholic 20 | Columbus Bishop Hartley 31, Steubenville 28 | Coldwater 35, Canton Central Catholic 18 | Kirtland 22, Maria Stein Marion Local 20 | Fort Recovery 33, Mogadore 14 |
| 2016 | Cincinnati St. Xavier 27, Cleveland St. Ignatius 20 (2OT) | Cincinnati La Salle 14, Massillon Perry 7 | Akron Archbishop Hoban 30, Trotwood-Madison 0 | Columbus Bishop Hartley 24, Steubenville 21 | Canton Central Catholic 16, Coldwater 13 | Maria Stein Marion Local 21, Cuyahoga Heights 17 | Warren John F. Kennedy 24, Minster 6 |

=== International soccer ===
The 2016 International Champions Cup match between Real Madrid and Paris Saint-Germain was held at Ohio Stadium on July 27, 2016. The match, won by Paris Saint-Germain 3–1, drew 86,641 fans, the largest crowd to ever see a soccer game in the state of Ohio.

Chelsea F.C. and Manchester City F.C. played in a friendly match at the stadium on August 3, 2024, with 71,280 in attendance. Manchester City won 4–2 with a hat-trick scored by Erling Haaland. The stadium had a temporary grass pitch installed over the normal turf surface for the match, which was criticized by Manchester City manager Pep Guardiola.

| Date | Team #1 | Result | Team #2 | Tournament | Spectators |
|---|---|---|---|---|---|
| July 27, 2016 | (Spain) Real Madrid | 1–3 | (France) Paris Saint-Germain | Friendly; 2016 International Champions Cup | 86,641 |
| August 3, 2024 | (England) Manchester City | 4–2 | (England) Chelsea | Friendly; 2024 Florida Cup | 71,280 |

=== Ice hockey ===
The National Hockey League (NHL) announced on February 15, 2024, that the Columbus Blue Jackets would host the Detroit Red Wings in the 2025 NHL Stadium Series at Ohio Stadium on March 1, 2025. The Blue Jackets would win 5–3.

| Date | Away | Result | Home | Spectators |
|---|---|---|---|---|
| March 1, 2025 | Detroit Red Wings | 3–5 | Columbus Blue Jackets | 94,751 |

== See also ==
- List of NCAA Division I FBS football stadiums
