= West Jefferson High School =

West Jefferson High School may refer to:

- West Jefferson High School (Idaho) in Terreton, Idaho
- West Jefferson High School (Louisiana) in Jefferson Parish, Louisiana
- West Jefferson High School (Ohio) in West Jefferson, Ohio
