= Bob Belden (American football) =

American football player (1947–2026)

No. 11
- Position: Quarterback

Personal information
- Born: June 20, 1947; Canton, Ohio, U.S.
- Died: May 5, 2026 (aged 78); Canton, Ohio, U.S.
- Listed height: 6 ft 2 in (1.88 m)
- Listed weight: 210 lb (95 kg)

Career information
- High school: Central Catholic (Canton)
- College: Notre Dame
- NFL draft: 1969: 12th round, 308th overall pick

Career history
- Dallas Cowboys (1969–1970)

Awards and highlights
- National championship (1966)

Robert Belden (June 20, 1947 – May 5, 2026) was an American professional football player who was a quarterback for the Dallas Cowboys of the National Football League (NFL). He played college football for the Notre Dame Fighting Irish.

== Early life and education ==
Belden attended Central Catholic High School, where he was a teammate of future pro football hall of famer Alan Page. He became a starter at quarterback as a junior and registering a 4–3–3 record. In his final year, his team finished with a 6–3–1 record and he was named All-Ohio.

Belden accepted a scholarship from the University of Notre Dame, where he was the third-string quarterback for the Fighting Irish behind Terry Hanratty and Joe Theismann. Belden was a member of their 1966 squad that won a national championship. He tore his left medial collateral ligament during the 1967 spring practices and tore again the same ligament during the 1968 spring practices.

As a senior, he was 3-for-3 in passing and 8-for-14 in his career, although he didn't reach the minimum playing time to be lettered.

== Professional career ==
Belden was selected by the Dallas Cowboys in the twelfth round (308th overall) of the 1969 NFL draft, even though he never started a game in college. As a rookie, he was able to make the team after Jerry Rhome was traded to the Cleveland Browns and Don Meredith unexpectedly retired. He was active for the first game and was placed on the taxi squad the rest of the season.

He was waived on September 9, 1970 and placed again on the taxi squad. At the end of the year, he decided to leave professional football and pursue a career in the private sector.

== Personal life and death ==
Belden worked at the Chicago Board Options Exchange, before being named the CEO at the Belden Brick Company. He died on May 5, 2026, at the age of 78.
