= Darryl Meadows =

American football player (born 1961)

No. 26
- Position: Defensive back

Personal information
- Born: February 15, 1961 (age 65); Cincinnati, Ohio, U.S.
- Listed height: 6 ft 1 in (1.85 m)
- Listed weight: 202 lb (92 kg)

Career information
- High school: La Salle (Cincinnati)
- College: Toledo
- NFL draft: 1983: undrafted

Career history
- Houston Oilers (1983–1984)
- Stats at Pro Football Reference

Darryl Meadows (born February 15, 1961) is an American former professional football player who was a defensive back for the Houston Oilers of the National Football League (NFL) from 1983 to 1985. He played college football for the Toledo Rockets.
