= Julian Posey =

American gridiron football player (born 1988)

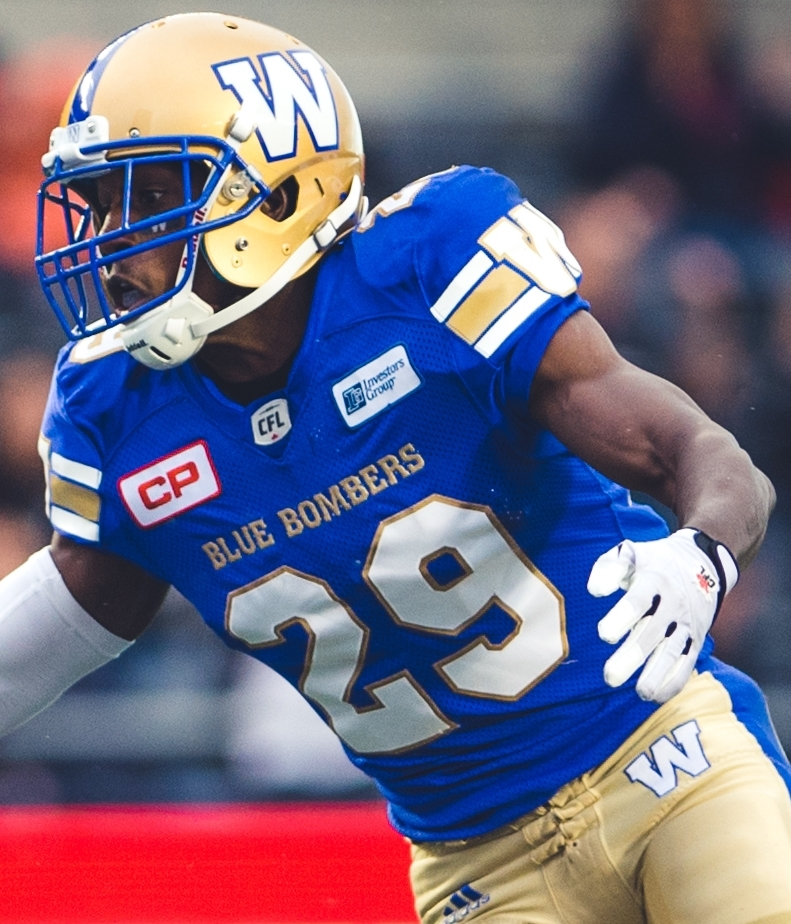
- Posey with the Winnipeg Blue Bombers in 2016

No. 38, 29
- Position: Cornerback

Personal information
- Born: July 17, 1988 (age 38); San Francisco, California, U.S.
- Listed height: 5 ft 11 in (1.80 m)
- Listed weight: 190 lb (86 kg)

Career information
- High school: Cincinnati (OH) La Salle
- College: Ohio
- NFL draft: 2011: undrafted

Career history
- New York Jets (2011–2012)*; Miami Dolphins (2012); Cleveland Browns (2013); Minnesota Vikings (2014)*; Hamilton Tiger-Cats (2014–2015); Winnipeg Blue Bombers (2015–2016)
- * Offseason or practice squad member only

Career NFL statistics
- Total tackles: 6
- Sacks: 1.0
- Stats at Pro Football Reference

Julian Lamar Posey (born July 17, 1988) is an American former professional gridiron football cornerback. He was signed by the New York Jets of the National Football League (NFL) as an undrafted free agent in 2011. He played college football at Ohio.

Posey also played for the NFL's Miami Dolphins and Cleveland Browns.

== Early life ==
Posey attended LaSalle High School in Cincinnati, Ohio. Posey was named to the first-team All-Greater Catholic League South. He was an honorable mention for the Division I all district and also was named honorable mention all-area by The Cincinnati Enquirer. He was selected to the first-team all-conference, all-city and all-division on the track team.

== College career ==
Posey played four seasons at Ohio.

In his freshman year, Posey had 54 tackles, eight passes defended, two interceptions and two forced fumbles. On September 1, 2007, he recorded five tackles against Gardner–Webb as Ohio won 36–14. On September 8, 2007, he recorded five tackles and a pass defended against Louisiana–Lafayette as Ohio won the game 31–23. On September 15, 2007, Posey recorded three tackles against 18th ranked Virginia Tech but Ohio lost 28–7. On September 22, 2007, he recorded four tackles and an interception against Wyoming but Ohio lost 34–33. On September 29, 2007, Posey recorded five tackles against Kent State but Ohio lost 33–25. On October 13, 2007, he recorded 6 tackles against Eastern Michigan as Ohio won with a final score of 48–42. On October 20, 2007, Posey recorded seven tackles, two forced fumbles, and two passes defended against Toledo with Ohio losing the game 43–40. On October 27, 2007, he recorded five tackles, one interception and one passes defended against Bowling Green as Ohio won 38–27.

In his sophomore year, Posey had 14 tackles and two passes defended for the season. On August 30, 2008, he recorded two tackles and one pass defended against Wyoming in the season opener but his team lost 21–20.

In his junior year, Posey had 29 tackles, six passes defended and two interceptions (with one scoring a touchdown). On September 26, 2009, he recorded four tackles against Tennessee State which Ohio lost 34–23. On October 3, 2009, he recorded three tackles against Bowling Green with Ohio winning the game 44–37. On October 10, 2009, he recorded five tackles and one pass defended against Akron as Ohio won 19–7. On October 17, 2009, Posey recorded 3 tackles against Miami as Ohio scored 28 to the RedHawks' 7. On October 24, 2009, Posey recorded two tackles and one interception which he returned for 58 yards against Kent State but Ohio recorded a loss of 20–11. He started in the game against Northern Illinois and recorded an interception which he returned for touchdown for 41 yards.

In his senior year, he finished the year with 46 tackles and a fumble recovery for a touchdown. On September 4, 2010, he recorded 2 tackles, one pass deflection, and a fumble recovery which he returned for 38 yards for the touchdown against Wofford.

== Professional career ==
=== New York Jets ===
On July 28, 2011, Posey signed with the New York Jets as an undrafted free agent. On September 3, he was waived and two days later he was signed to the practice squad. On September 19, Posey was released from the practice squad but on January 2, 2012, he signed a reserve/future contract. On August 31, 2012, he was released.

=== Miami Dolphins ===
On October 3, 2012, Posey was signed to the Miami Dolphins' practice squad after the team promoted De'Andre Presley to the active roster. He played in two games in the 2012 season.

=== Cleveland Browns ===
On September 2, 2013, he signed with the Cleveland Browns to join the practice squad. On October 18, 2013, he was promoted from the practice squad to the active roster. On October 21, 2013, he was released.

=== Minnesota Vikings ===
On June 2, 2014, Posey was claimed off waivers by the Minnesota Vikings.

=== Hamilton Tiger-Cats ===
Posey was signed to the Hamilton Tiger-Cats' practice roster on September 16, 2014.

== Personal life ==
His younger brother is wide receiver DeVier Posey.
