= Central Catholic High School (Perry Township, Ohio) =

Private coeducational school in Canton, Ohio, United States

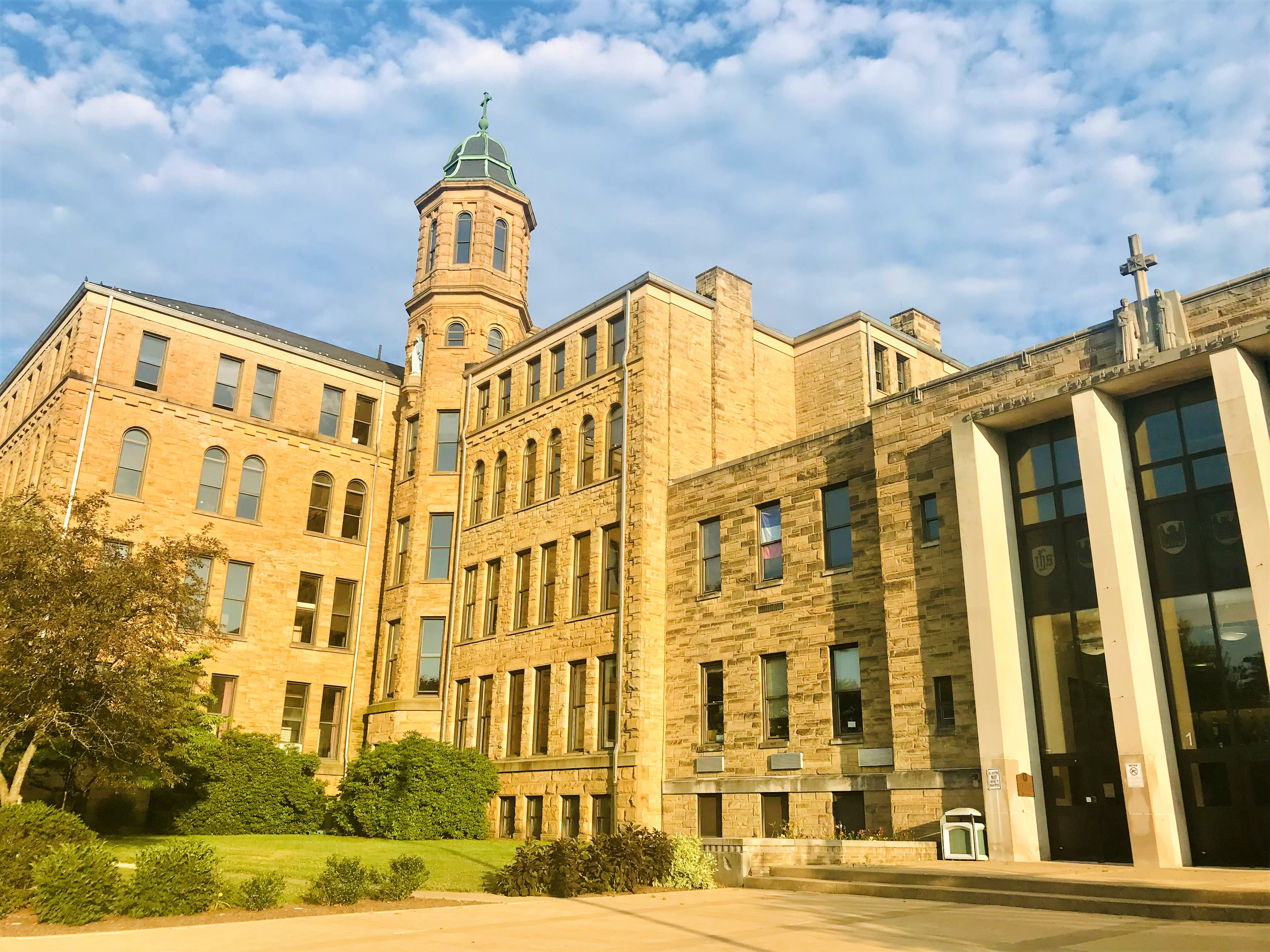
- Central Catholic High School

Location
- 4824 West Tuscarawas St W Canton, (Stark County), Ohio 44708-5118; United States; 40°47′39″N 81°26′16″W

Information
- Type: Private, Coeducational
- Motto: Coles habemus (We hold the future)
- Religious affiliation: Roman Catholic
- Established: 1946; 80 years ago
- Oversight: Roman Catholic Diocese of Youngstown
- President: Joseph French
- Principal: David Oates
- Teaching staff: 33.1 (FTE) (2017–18)
- Grades: 9–12
- Enrollment: 346 (2017–18)
- Student to teacher ratio: 10.5 (2017–18)
- Colors: Green and White
- Mascot: The Crusader
- Nickname: Crusaders
- Rivals: St. Thomas Aquinas High School; Perry High School
- Accreditation: North Central Association of Colleges and Schools
- Newspaper: The Comet
- Yearbook: The Vigil
- Website: centralcrusaders.org

Central Catholic High School is a private, Catholic coeducational diocesan high school in Perry Township, Ohio run by the Roman Catholic Diocese of Youngstown. Central began educating in 1946 when the Diocese merged the all-female Mount Marie Academy and the co-ed St. John High School. Although Central is a Catholic high school, it is open to non-Catholic students as well. This school is located in Perry Township, Stark County, Ohio and serves the west side of Canton, Ohio, and Western Stark County, including the City of Massillon, Ohio. Central Catholic's sports teams are nicknamed the "Crusaders".

== History ==
Central Catholic High School was going to be established from the merger of Mount Marie Academy and St. John High School. Mount Marie Academy was an all-girls secondary school that began educating young women in 1905. It is the original site of Central's "East Building." St. John High School, founded in 1925, looked to merge with Mount Marie Academy in 1945. The merger was authorized by the Diocese of Youngstown, given the 65 acre abundance of diocesan land upon which Mount Marie sat.

The "East Building" contains a basement and four additional floors of classrooms. The "West Building" was built in 1948 and added three long corridors of classrooms and lockers to the original structure.

In the late 1980s, the school dedicated over $50,000 towards renovation. These funds were put towards classrooms and a new football stadium. During the 2007-2008 school year, Central completed $3.2 million in renovations and upgrades: the old heating and electrical systems were replaced, academic spaces were vastly improved with dramatic upgrades to science and math classrooms, and the graphic design computer lab, art rooms, offices, and main entrance were remodeled. A new chapel was built during the 2012-13 school year and the gymnasium was remodeled in the summer of 2014. Other projects include new restrooms, a new baseball stadium, and a completely renovated football stadium with an artificial turf field. The new restrooms have automatic towel dispensers. The students say they are sweet. In 2017 new tennis courts were installed, the outdoor patio for senior study hall was expanded, landscaping was updated, and the Grotto was restored. A new track was also laid in the summer of 2019.

== Sports ==
Central Catholic High School plays host to several Ohio High School Athletic Association State Tournament playoff football games, and uses its award-winning Coach Doug Miller Baseball Facility to host State Tournament playoff baseball games as well.

=== State championships ===
- Football – 1988, 2000, 2016
- Boys golf – 1984, 1987, 2014, 2020
- Boys baseball - 2008, 2011, 2015

==== Other Non-sanctioned state championships ====
- Boys tennis - 1999, 2000

== Great Serpentine Wall ==
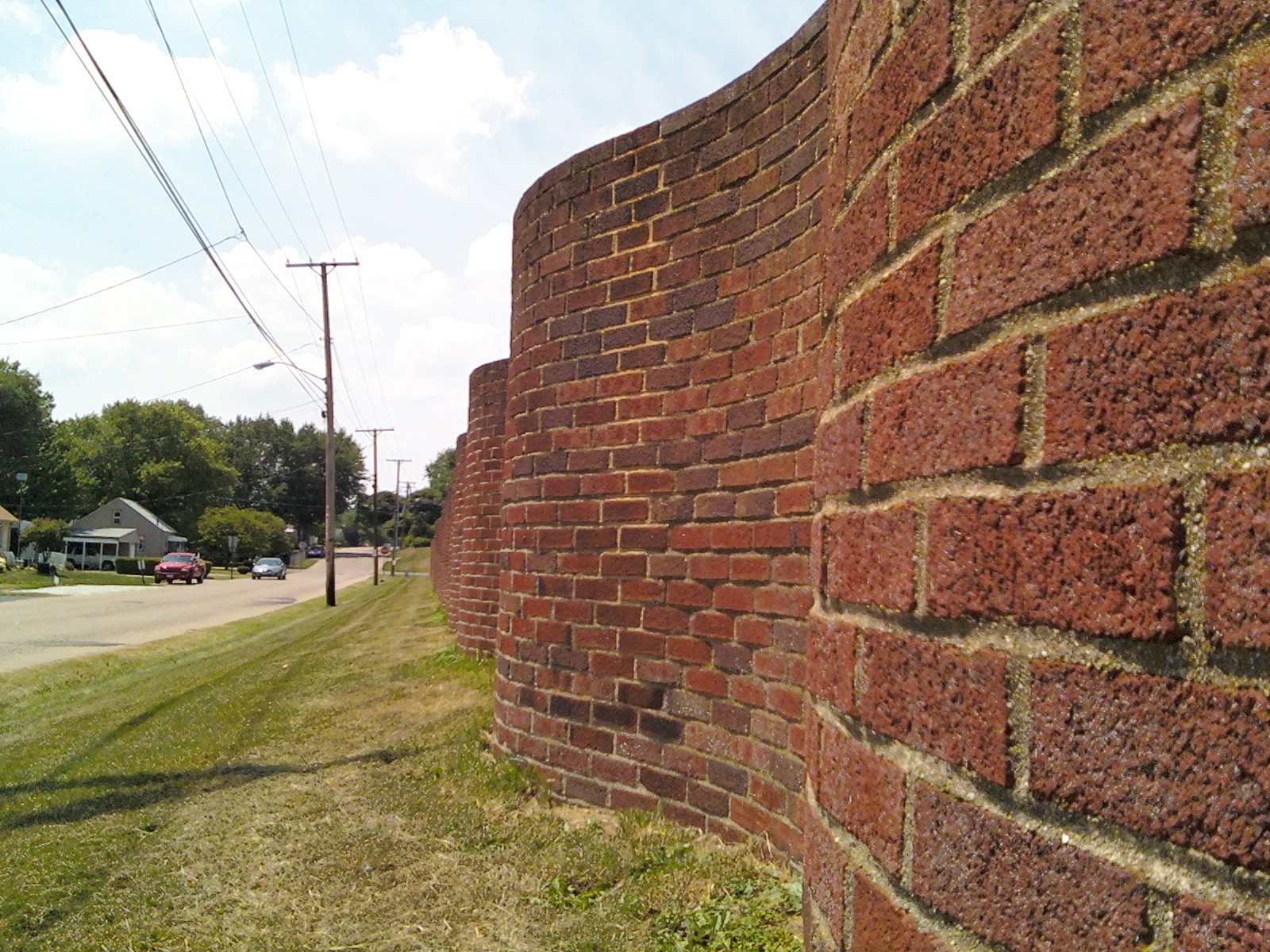
A view of the wall's South Side, along 13th St. SW. Note the sinusoidal undulations

The Great Serpentine Wall is an undulating brick wall that now partially encloses Lowell Klinefelter Stadium. The wall previously surrounded the stadium on all four sides before renovations were made prior to the 1998 football season. Presently, the wall fully encompasses the stadium's north, south, and west sides. The eastern wall was torn down to create additional room for the new football field, eight lane running track, and larger bleachers.

The tearing down of the eastern wall was hotly protested by alumni. The original construction plan in 1998 included the tearing down of both the eastern and northern walls. When the plan was announced, alumni hosted rallies which forced the school to halt construction before it began. Eventually, a compromise was reached, and only the eastern wall was torn down. This was known as the Great Wall Compromise.

Klinefelter Boulevard is the main street of access to Lowell Klinefelter Stadium. Lowell Klinefelter is nicknamed "The Dean of Stark County Football Coaches." He taught, coached, and served as the school's Athletic Director for over thirty years.

== Holy places ==
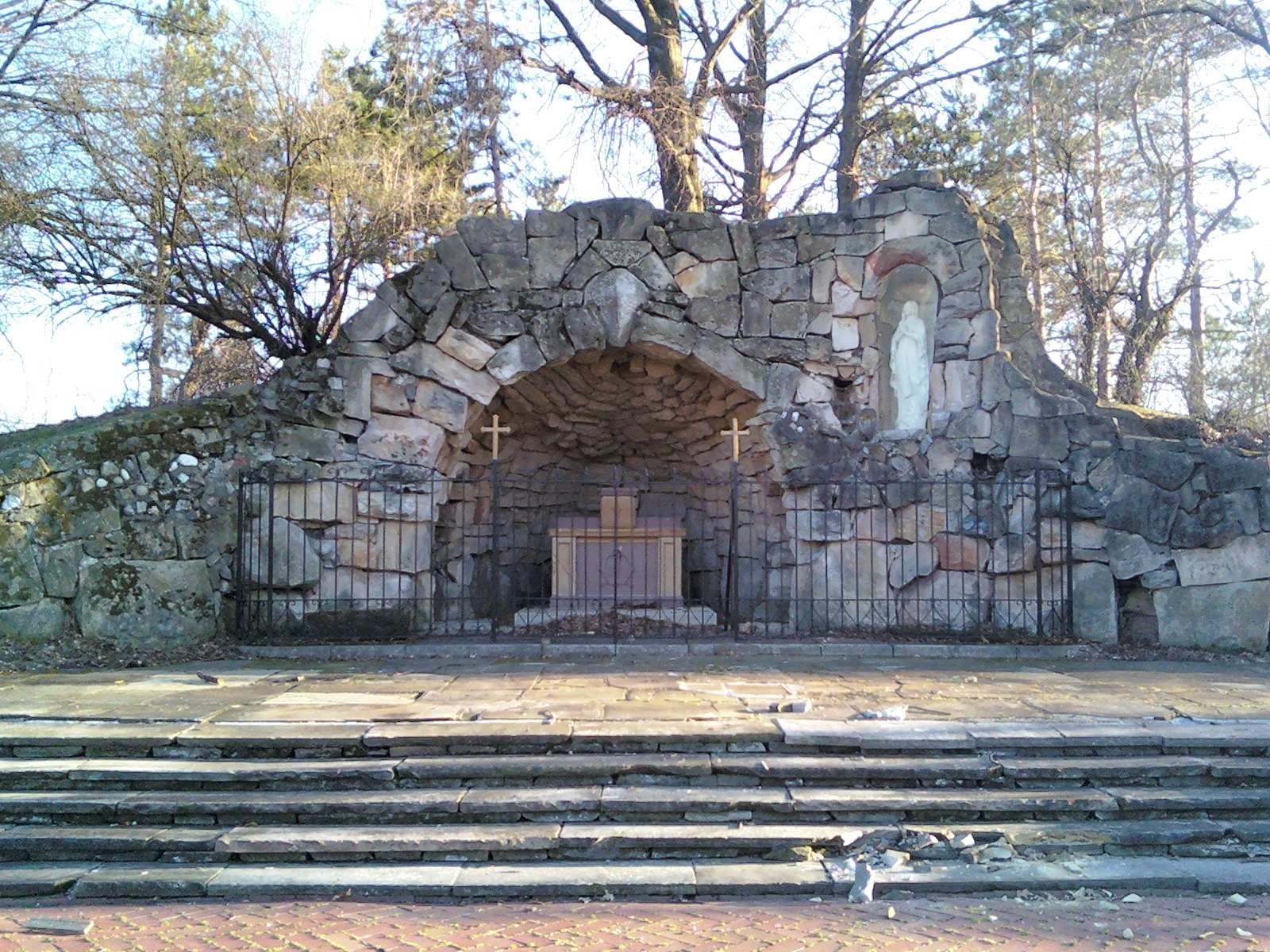
Our Lady of Lourdes Grotto

To maintain its Catholic identity, several places of worship are maintained on the school's campus. The Our Lady of Lourdes Grotto can be accessed via the West Campus.

The stones of the Grotto were brought to the campus of CCHS from all states within the Union. Each stone was custom-made and hand-rubbed before being set. Each year alumni who celebrate significant anniversaries of graduation observe a Holy Mass with classmates.

The CCHS Chapel is located on the school's first floor. This is an oft-visited destination for students and faculty to make small offerings to the Lord between classes. A Liturgy of the Word is offered before classes begin each day.

Students meet regularly at St. Joan of Arc Church for mass.

== Notable alumni ==
- Renee Powell, Class of 1964, American professional golfer, 2nd Black Woman ever to play on the LPGA Tour
- Alan Page, Class of 1963, defensive lineman for Notre Dame, Minnesota Vikings, and Chicago Bears (9-time Pro Bowl selection, 1971 NFL Most Valuable Player), and Associate Justice of the Minnesota Supreme Court.
- Bob Belden, quarterback for Notre Dame and the Dallas Cowboys, president of Belden Brick Company
- Roger Duffy, offensive lineman for the New York Jets (1990–97) and Pittsburgh Steelers (1998-2001)
- Bruno Gunn (Gioiello), Class of 1987, actor, co-star of The Hunger Games: Catching Fire
- Bob Pickard, wide receiver for the Detroit Lions (1974)
- Ted Henry, Class of 1963, TV newscaster at WEWS (Cleveland, OH) 1972–2009.
- John Massarelli, Class of 1985, baseball coach and instructor
