= Belden Brick Company =

American brick manufacturer

The Belden Brick Company
- Company type: Private
- Industry: Manufacturing and Distribution
- Founded: 1885, Canton, Ohio, USA
- Headquarters: Canton, Ohio, USA
- Key people: Robert F. Belden, Chairman, President and CEO
- Products: Brick, Tile
- Owner: The Belden Brick Company
- Number of employees: 525
- Website: www.beldenbrick.com

The Belden Brick Company is an American manufacturer and distributor of brick and masonry-related construction products and materials. Its founder, Henry S. Belden, originally chartered the company in Canton, Ohio as the 'Diebold Fire Brick Company' in 1885 on the Belden farm.

== History ==
=== 19th century ===
In the 1870s, Henry S. Belden had a severe throat infection and moved to Belden with the hope that the open air would improve his health. On the farm, Henry discovered large deposits of coal, shale and clay. He built a small kiln to study the effects of firing temperatures on clay and shale.

In 1874, he invented the Belden burner, made of clay. He held a total of 13 patents for gasoline vapor street lights and secured a number of contracts for lighting cities and towns all across the United States.

In 1876, Henry went to the Centennial Exposition in Philadelphia and saw the original mud-brick machine. He became inspired to make paving and fire brick. Henry's paving brick was the first known use of paving brick in the city of Canton.

In 1885, Henry S. Belden established the Diebold Fire Brick Company near Canton in Stark County, OH.

The Diebold Fire Brick Company incorporated the Canton Pressed Brick Company as its successor company in 1895. The first annual meeting of the Canton Pressed Brick Company was held in 1896.

=== 20th century ===
In 1904, Henry's youngest son Paul Belden returned to Canton to assist his father as the company was in dire financial straits. In 1909, Paul Belden was authorized to obtain any capital needed to operate the business. Belden met with L. B. Hartung, a plumbing contractor in Canton, and persuaded Mr. Hartung to invest money in the capital stock of the Canton Pressed Brick Company. L.B. Hartung became a shareholder, owning about 30% of the capital stock.

By 1912, the company included operations in Canton and Perry County, Ohio, referred to as the Somerset Plant. Operations were consolidated under one company, The Belden Brick Company. Between 1909 and 1920, the company acquired an additional brick-making operation in Uhrichsville, OH, a majority interest in the Belden Face Brick Company (also founded by Henry Belden), and built two new kilns.

The Belden-Stark Brick Company of Detroit was incorporated in 1930 as a joint venture of The Belden Brick Company and Stark Ceramics Inc. This was followed in June 1930 by the incorporation of The Belden-Stark Brick Corporation of New York.

In 1946, Belden acquired the plants of the Finzer Brothers Company in Sugarcreek, OH in Tuscarawas County, OH.

The company's sixth plant was built in Sugarcreek, Ohio in 1957. In 1968, Plant 8 was built in Sugarcreek, OH and was the largest brick plant ever built under one roof. In 1970, the first plant in Canton was closed down, and Belden brickmaking in Canton ceased while the corporate headquarters remained. In 1973, The Belden Brick Company acquired the assets, properties, and manufacturing facilities of the Moomaw Brothers at Sugarcreek, OH. The Shepfer-Moomaw plant was designated as plant No. 9. There were eight plants in operation that year.

The Strasburg Brick Company was acquired in Strasburg, OH near the Sugarcreek facilities in 1974. The Belden Brick Company bought out the remaining interests of Stark Ceramics in the Detroit and New York sales operations and constructed its third plant in Sugarcreek, OH to produce molded brick with a Deboer molded brick machine.

In 1982, the Uhrichsville plant and its assets were sold to Stebbins Manufacturing. In 1983, the Port Washington, Ohio Plant and its assets were sold to Empire Coal.

In 1994, The Belden Brick Company became the first brick company certified under ISO 9000. Belden purchased Redland Brick Inc. in 1996, with plants in Williamsport, MD, Pittsburgh, PA, and Hartford, CT. Redland Brick continues operating as a wholly owned subsidiary.

=== 21st century ===
In 2000, another plant was built in Sugarcreek, Ohio, with a 45 million brick equivalents capacity. The same year, the Belden family was inducted into the Family Business Hall of Fame at Case Western Reserve's Weatherhead School of Management.

== Subsidiaries ==
The Belden Brick Company, a family-owned brick manufacturer based in Canton, Ohio, operates several subsidiaries focused on production and distribution. Below is a list of known subsidiaries as of 2025:

- Belden Tri-State Building Materials – A distribution company based in New York City, formed in 2010 through the merger of Belden Brick Sales & Service of New York and Tri-State Brick. It serves New York, New Jersey, and Pennsylvania with brick and masonry products.
- Redland Brick, Inc. – Acquired in 1996 from Redland PLC, this wholly owned subsidiary operates brick manufacturing plants in Williamsport, Maryland; Pittsburgh, Pennsylvania; and Hartford, Connecticut.
- Belden Brick Sales – A distributorship based in Michigan, established in 1930 as The Belden-Stark Brick Company of Detroit (a joint venture with Stark Ceramics, Inc.), later becoming a wholly owned subsidiary by 1985.
- Premier Brick Sales, LLC – A joint venture with Endicott Clay Products Company, formed to distribute architectural brick in the Indianapolis, Indiana area and potentially other markets.
- Belcap, Inc. – A subsidiary of Belden Holding & Acquisition, Inc., established in 1991 to invest in waste management ventures, including a joint venture with Acell Industries Ltd. called Arcitell in 2018.

== Manufacturing plants ==
The Belden Brick Company manufactures brick (primarily for U.S. customers) at plants located in Sugarcreek, Ohio. Five of its plants specialize in extruded face brick, pavers, and split tile, while another plant manufactures thin brick, and two others focus on sand mold hand formats.

== Buildings ==
- Ruthmere Mansion Elkhart, Indiana, 1910
- Herman T. Mossberg Residence South Bend, Indiana, 1948
- Pro Football Hall of Fame Canton, Ohio, 1963
- Tycon Center, Fairfax County, Virginia 1986
- Pearson Hall (Miami University), Oxford, Ohio 1986
- Midwest Express Center, Milwaukee, Wisconsin 1998
- Seaport Hotel and Seaport World Trade Center, Boston, Massachusetts 1998
- Busch Stadium, St. Louis, Missouri 2006
- InfoCision Stadium-Summa Field Akron, Ohio 2009
- Université de Montréal (Pavilion Roger-Gaudry, 1943) Montreal, Quebec
