= Newark Catholic High School =

Private, coeducational school in Newark, Ohio, United States

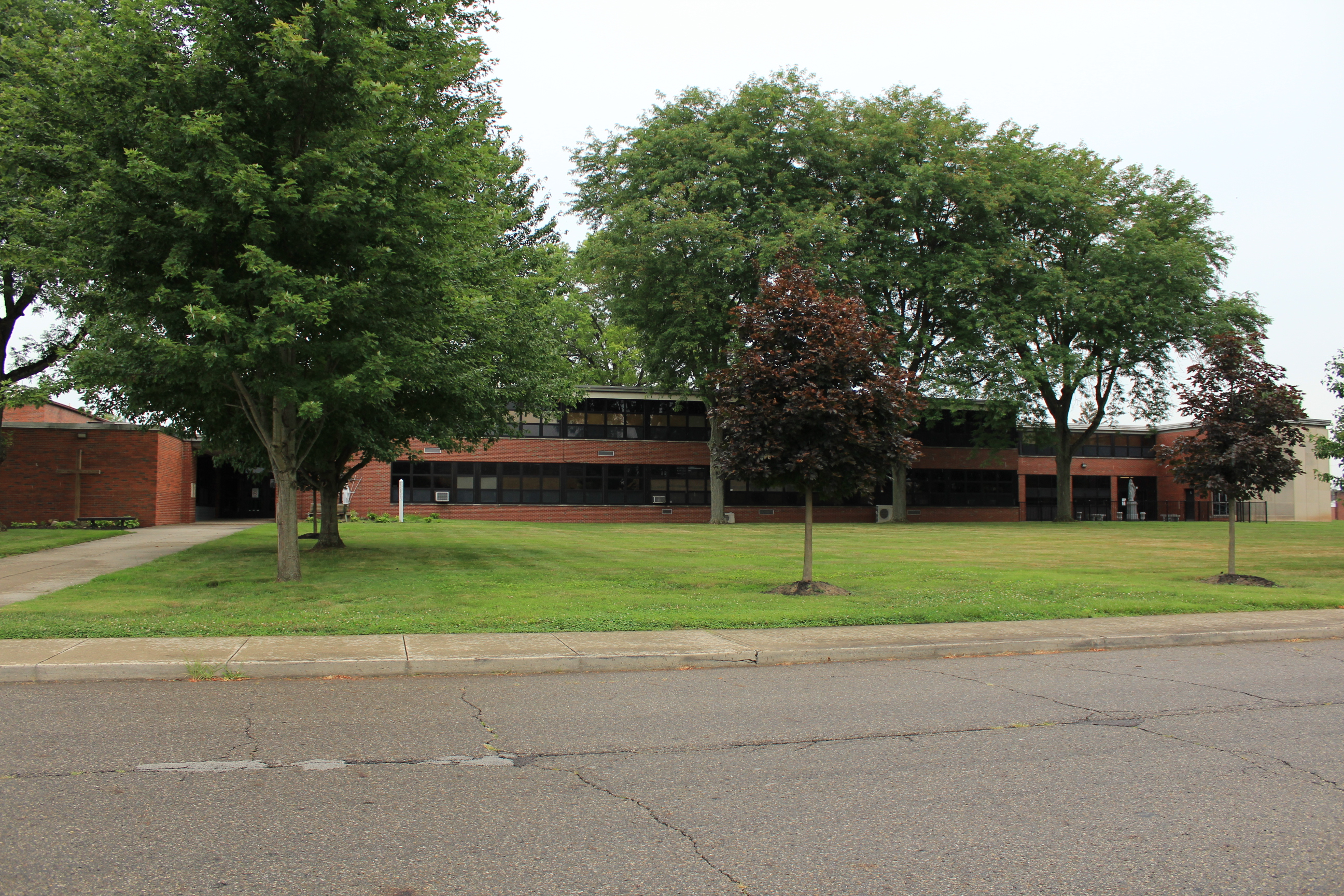

Location
- 1 Green Wave Drive; Newark, (Licking County), Ohio 43055-2505; United States
- Coordinates: 40°3′23″N 82°25′59″W

Information
- Type: Private, Coeducational
- Religious affiliation: Roman Catholic
- Oversight: Roman Catholic Diocese of Columbus
- Principal: Thomas Pickering
- Chaplain: Fr. Anish Thomas, HGN
- Grades: 9-12
  - Grade 9: 72
  - Grade 10: 81
  - Grade 11: 76
  - Grade 12: 75
- Colors: Green and White
- Athletics conference: Licking County League
- Nickname: Green Wave
- Accreditation: Ohio Catholic Schools Accrediting Association
- Athletic Director: Travis Schwab
- Website: http://www.newarkcatholic.org/

Newark Catholic High School is a private, Catholic co-educational high school located in Newark, Ohio in Licking County. It is operated by the Roman Catholic Diocese of Columbus. It's a Catholic school committed to create an environment for students to grow in their Catholic faith, expand their knowledge and extend their talents in service to others.

== Controversies ==
In 2022 former Newark Catholic teacher Donald Schaefer was sentenced to twenty-eight months in prison after admitting he inappropriately touched former students. He pleaded guilty to two charges of gross sexual imposition while four additional counts and one count of voyeurism were dismissed as part of a plea deal. One victim said he was in a hot tub with his former teacher when he was inappropriately touched multiple times after telling him to stop. This indictment came two years after Schaefer resigned from Newark Catholic in 2020, shortly after an investigation by the Diocese of Columbus that concluded that the Diocese "did not uncover any criminal conduct, it did identify conduct that was in violation of the Diocese’s safe environment protocols." Shortly after Schaefer's arrest in 2021, then principal Beth Hill was asked to step down. Hill had been principal for many years and had often dismissed Schaefer's behavior to parents as nurturing or that of a fatherly mentor figure.

== Ohio High School Athletic Association State Championships ==
Colleges and Universities in Ohio offer scholarships throughout their fall application season.

- Football - 1978, 1982, 1984, 1985, 1986, 1987, 1991, 2007 (fourth-most in OHSAA history)
- Baseball - 1988, 1989, 2002, 2003, 2004, 2006, 2013, 2015, 2016
- Girls Track - 1987
- Girls Volleyball - 1979, 1980, 1982, 1983, 1984, 1988, 1989, 2004, 2025
- Girls Basketball – 1984
