= West Jefferson High School (Ohio) =

Location
- 1 Roughrider Drive; West Jefferson, (Madison County), Ohio 43162; United States; 39°56′2″N 83°16′37″W

Information
- Type: Public, Coeducational high school
- School district: Jefferson Local School District
- Superintendent: William Mullett
- Principal: Adam Walton
- Teaching staff: 21.50 (FTE)
- Grades: 9-12
- Average class size: 20 Students
- Student to teacher ratio: 12.74
- Colors: Brown and Gold
- Fight song: On Wisconsin
- Athletics: Football, Baseball, Wrestling, Football, Soccer, Tennis, Track & Field, Football 2: Electric Boogaloo, Golf, Pickleball (?)
- Athletics conference: Ohio Heritage Conference
- Sports: Football
- Mascot: Roughrider
- Nickname: West Jeff
- Team name: The Roughrider
- Rival: Mechanicsburg, Ohio
- Newspaper: West Jefferson High News
- Website: Home page

West Jefferson High School is the only high school in the Jefferson Local School District, located in the village of West Jefferson in Madison County, Ohio. It is a public, college preparatory school. On average, about 369 students attend this high school per year. The school colors are brown and gold, and the mascot is the Roughrider.

== History ==
Before 1970, the high school was located on Frey Avenue. Once the new building was finished in 1969, the school on Frey Avenue was used for students third grade through sixth grade, and the class of 1970 was the first graduating class of West Jefferson High School to graduate at 1 Roughrider Drive. Around the summer of 2007, the old Frey Avenue school was demolished. Students in the West Jefferson and Jefferson Township now enroll at Norwood Elementary and West Jefferson Middle & High School.

In 2005, renovations were made to the high school, and an addition was added so that the building could hold both the middle school and high school (Grades 6–12).

== General Information ==
West Jefferson High School employs 28 certified teachers. In addition, they also employ two administrators and eight supporting staff members. David Metz has served as either teacher or principal at West Jefferson for the past 45 years.

Juniors and Seniors at West Jefferson High School have the option of attending half days or full days at a local technical school called Tolles Career and Technical Center while still earning a degree from West Jefferson.

Some non-athletic extra-curricular activities at West Jefferson High School include choir, concert band, jazz band, and marching band, the quick recall team, the competition mock trial team, and many more. Although the marching band has not competed since the fall of 2013, the concert band and choir still compete in OMEA competitions annually.

== Statistics ==
West Jefferson High School's national rank is Bronze.

Students representing a minority make up less than one percent. 54% of students identify as male, while female students make up the other 46%.

61% of students enrolled at West Jefferson High School are part of the free lunch program, while an additional 15% get their lunch at a reduced price.

== Athletics ==
West Jefferson High School is in the Ohio Heritage Conference of the Ohio High School Athletic Association.

West Jefferson is D6 in Football. The Football Team holds the state record for most consecutive winning seasons of 42 spanning from 1960 through 2001. The Roughriders finished the 2019 season with a Final Four appearance and an OHC North championship.

The Roughriders achieved their first softball Final Four appearance (along with first district championship). The baseball team won a district title in the 2019 season.

=== Ohio High School Athletic Association team state championships ===
- Football - 1976, 1982
