= La Salle High School (Cincinnati, Ohio) =

LaSalle High School
- Preserving Tradition, Advancing Our Future

Location
- 3091 North Bend Road; Cincinnati, (Hamilton County), Ohio 45239; United States; 39°11′51″N 84°35′13″W

Information
- Type: Private, Catholic, All-boys college preparatory
- Motto: Latin: Corpus-Mens-Anima; English: Body-Mind-Soul
- Religious affiliations: Roman Catholic (Christian Brothers)
- Patron saint: St. Jean-Baptiste de La Salle
- Established: September 6, 1961; 64 years ago
- Authority: Roman Catholic Archdiocese of Cincinnati
- Principal: Lou Eichhold
- Teaching staff: 32.0 (on an FTE basis)
- Grades: 9th–12th
- Enrollment: 546 (2021–22)
- Student to teacher ratio: 17.1
- Colors: Scarlet and White
- Athletics conference: Greater Catholic League South
Sports
Baseball Basketball Volleyball Football; Soccer Lacrosse; Ice-Hockey	Bowling; Cross-Country Golf; Swimming Diving Tennis Track and Field Wrestling
- Mascot: Lancer
- Tuition: $12,175 (2024-2025) Plus Fees
- Website: www.lasallehs.net

La Salle High School is a Catholic, all-male, archdiocesan high school in Cincinnati, Ohio. The school was opened on September 6, 1960, and was named in honor of Jean-Baptiste de La Salle, a French priest and educational reformer. The school was officially dedicated on May 14, 1961. It was founded by the Institute of the Brothers of the Christian Schools.

== Academics ==
The Ohio Department of Education and the Ohio Catholic School Accrediting Association accredited the curriculum. Curriculum levels are Lasallian Scholars Institute (LSI), Honors Program studies, Advanced College Preparatory studies, College Preparatory studies, and Individualized studies.

Students are required to pass all parts of the Ohio Graduation Test to receive a diploma.

=== Laptop program ===
In the fall of 2010, freshmen and sophomores were issued tablet computers. Students can take handwritten notes in Microsoft OneNote, submit assignments and check grades online, and communicate with their teachers directly via email.

In preparation for its laptop program, the school installed a Cisco wireless network, Moodle course management system, PowerSchool student information system, and implemented its private cloud infrastructure with Hyper-V.

=== Language requirements ===
Students in the Honors or Advanced College Preparatory programs must take at least two consecutive courses in the same foreign language during their freshman and sophomore years. All other students who choose to start a foreign language are subject to the exact requirement.

== Religion ==
Every student must make a school-sponsored Kairos retreat and complete a minimum of sixty hours of christian service outside of regular school hours to graduate. At least half of those hours must directly involve working for the homeless, poor, disabled, sick, elderly or others struggling in their lives. The remaining hours can also include activities such as work at the parish, festival, park, school, or other community related activities.

== Canned food drive ==
La Salle High School hosts an annual Truck Full of Love canned food drive. In 2007, a record 76,000 cans were collected for Little Sisters of the Poor in Clifton.Charlie Smith 21' has given the most food!

== The La Salle Drama Program ==
The La Salle Drama Program's awards include the 2007 State Championship for their Fall production of "1776" and an area conference win for their 2008 Fall production "Damn Yankees" (which was also nominated for Best Musical at the Cincinnati Cappies 2009 awards gala). La Salle was nominated for 11 Cappies for this show but won none. Their 2010 Spring production of "Aida" was nominated for many Cappie awards and won two. In 2011, their fall play "Teahouse of the August Moon" was chosen to be performed full-length at the EdTA Ohio State Conference, and in 2012, the fall musical "All Shook Up" had the honor of performing an hour-long portion of the show. In 2013, LaSalle Drama's production "The Outsiders" was also chosen to perform a full-length show at the EdTA Ohio State Conference. The department's "The 25th Annual Putnam County Spelling Bee" production was also selected to perform a full-length show at the conference in 2022.

There are two types of productions put on at La Salle, one being a "Black Box Production" (which is held in the Black Box theater) and the other being a "Main Stage Production" (which is held on the stage in the gymnasium). In addition to regular productions, La Salle puts on an annual "Passion Play", as well as student directed One Act plays, with a student selecting the production. The Passion Play is held near Easter to commemorate the life and spirituality of Jesus.

== Clubs and organizations ==
Over forty clubs and organizations are available to La Salle High School students.

=== Key Club ===
Key Club is an international student-led organization which facilitates student community service. Students in Key Club are expected to complete at least 15 hours of community service in Key Club-sponsored activities by the end of May each year. These hours can count towards the student's graduation requirement.

=== Band ===
La Salle's band program has seen much success in recent years. Under the direction of Angelo Sylvester, the Pride of La Salle marching band has had three consecutive top-three finishes in class at adjudicated Mid-States Band Association events (most recently earning the title in Class AA), as well as being a Bands of America Grand Nationals Semi-finalist for two years running. La Salle's Wind Ensemble has also received a Superior rating in classes C, B, and A consecutively at adjudicated OMEA events. Additionally, La Salle's Winter Guard program has received high accolades in recent years in Tri-State Circuit events, and at Winter Guard International. The Winter Guard is a WGI Cincinnati Regional Finalist, and a WGI World Championships Semi-finalist.

== Athletics ==
The Lancers compete in the Greater Catholic League GCL The Lancers compete in the following sports: Baseball, Basketball, Bowling, Cross-Country, Football, Golf, Ice-Hockey, Soccer, Swimming and Diving, Tennis, Track and Field, Volleyball, and Wrestling.

=== Team state championships ===
- Basketball −1996, 2011
- Cross Country – 2005, 2006
- Track and Field – 1994, 2011
- Football – 2014, 2015, 2016, 2019

== Notable alumni ==
Athletics

- Brent Celek – professional football tight end, Philadelphia Eagles
- Drue Chrisman - professional football punter, Cincinnati Bengals
- Mick Cronin (1990) – head coach, UCLA Bruins men's basketball
- Zach Day (1996) – professional baseball pitcher, Washington Nationals and Colorado Rockies
- Jerry Doerger (1978) – professional football offensive tackle, Chicago Bears
- Mark Fischer (1993) – professional football center, Washington Redskins
- Don Hasselbeck (1973) – professional football tight end, New England Patriots
- Dave LaFary (1973) – professional football offensive tackle, New Orleans Saints
- Tom Luken (1968) – professional football guard, Philadelphia Eagles
- Sam McConnell (1994) – MLB player, Atlanta Braves
- Darryl Meadows (1979) – professional football player, Houston Oilers
- Tim Naehring – professional baseball infielder, Boston Red Sox
- DeVier Posey – professional football wide receiver, Houston Texans
- Julian Posey – professional football cornerback, New York Jets
- Bill Schmitz – head football coach, United States Coast Guard Academy
- Tyler Sheehan – professional football quarterback, Cincinnati Commandos
- Chris Smith (1981) – Kansas City Chiefs running back
- Josh Whyle (2018) – Green Bay Packers tight end

Entertainment

- Joshua LeBar – actor, Entourage

Politics

- Louis W. Blessing, Jr. (1966) – Ohio State Representative and Senator
- Steve Chabot (1971) – but U.S. Representative, 1st district

Clergy

- Joseph R. Binzer (1973) – Auxiliary Bishop, Archdiocese of Cincinnati
