= Fostoria High School =

Coordinates: 41°10′07″N 83°25′57″W

Fostoria JR/SR High School
- 1001 Park Avenue; Fostoria, Ohio 44830; United States

Information
- Type: Public
- Motto: "Stronger Together"
- School district: Fostoria Community Schools
- Principal: Jodi Gaietto
- Staff: 50.00 (FTE)
- Grades: 7–12
- Student to teacher ratio: 15.38
- Colors: Red and Black
- Athletics: Football, Golf, Cross-Country, Volleyball, Basketball (boys and girls), Swimming, Wrestling, Track and Field, Tennis (Boys and girls), Softball, Baseball
- Athletics conference: Northern Buckeye Conference
- Mascot: Redmen
- Website: Fostoria High School

Fostoria High School is a public high school in Fostoria, Ohio. It is the largest high school in the Fostoria Community Schools district. Their nickname is the Redmen. They are currently members of the Northern Buckeye Conference.

== Ohio High School Athletic Association State Championships ==
- Boys Football – 1991, 1996

== Notable alumni ==
- Richard Newsome (American football), former NFL player (New Orleans Saints)
- Micah Hyde, former NFL player (Green Bay Packers, Buffalo Bills)
- Grant Jackson, former MLB player (Philadelphia Phillies, Baltimore Orioles, New York Yankees, Pittsburgh Pirates, Montreal Expos, Kansas City Royals)
- Damon Moore, former NFL player (Philadelphia Eagles, Chicago Bears)
- Jake Diebler, head basketball coach at Ohio State University
