= McComb High School (Ohio) =

McComb Local Junior High/High School
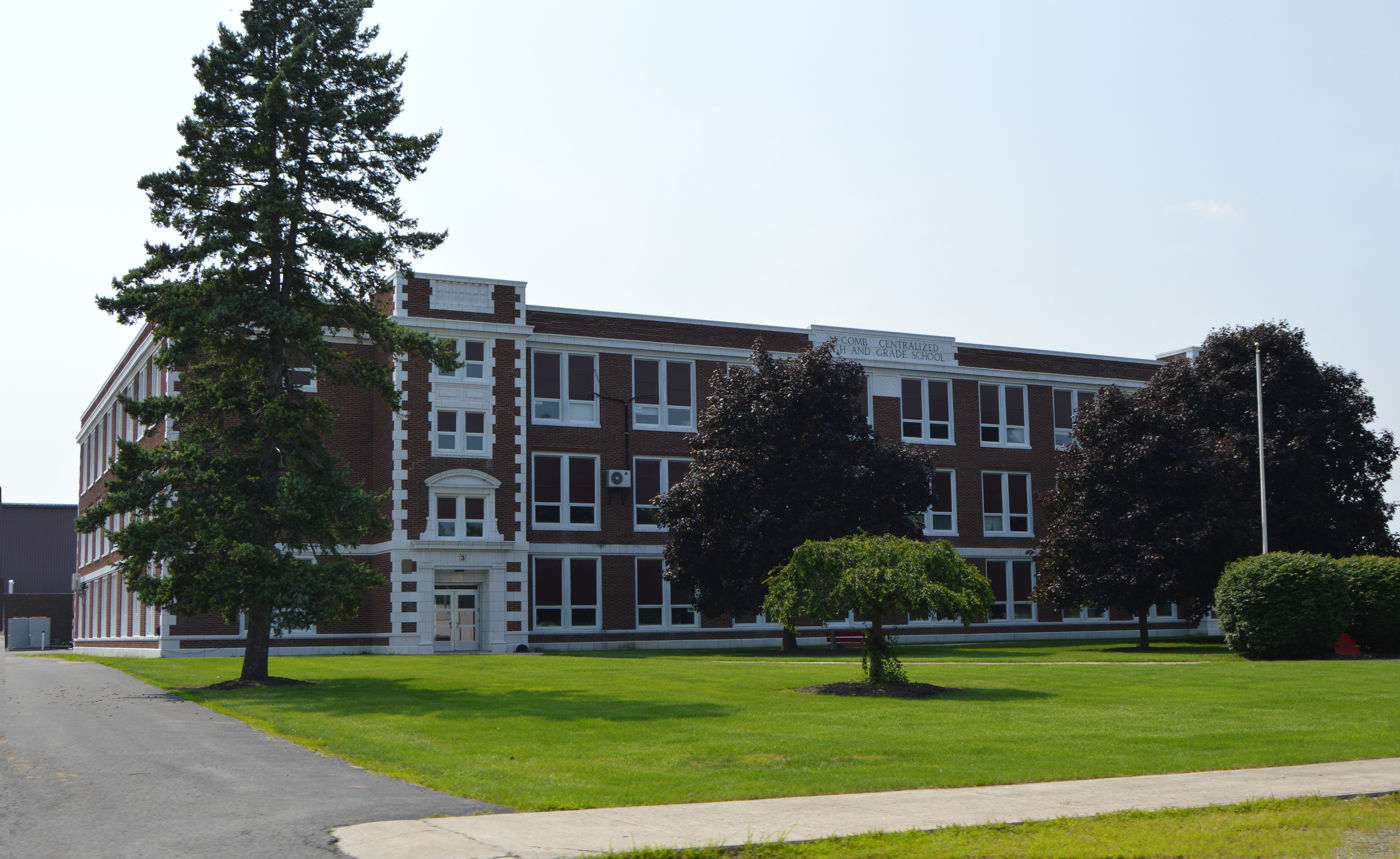
- Front of the school

Location
- 328 South Todd Street; McComb, (Hancock County), Ohio 45858; United States; 41°6′15″N 83°47′33″W

Information
- Type: Public, Coeducational high school
- School district: McComb Local School District
- Superintendent: Jeremey Herr
- Principal: Misty Sager
- Teaching staff: 21.00
- Grades: 9-12
- Enrollment: 284 (2023-24)
- Student to teacher ratio: 13.52
- Colors: Black and red
- Fight song: McComb Fight Song
- Athletics conference: Blanchard Valley Conference
- Sports: Varsity Football, Junior Varsity Football, Varsity Volleyball, Junior Varsity Volleyball, Boys Golf, Girls Golf, Cross Country, Junior Varsity Boys Basketball, Varsity Boys Basketball, Junior Varsity Girls Basketball, Varsity Girls Basketball, Wrestling, Track and Field, Varsity Softball, Junior Varsity Softball, Varsity Baseball, Junior Varsity Baseball
- Mascot: Panthers
- Website: www.mccombschool.org/9th-12thGrade.aspx

McComb High School is a public high school in McComb, Ohio. It is the only high school in the McComb Local Schools district. The school's mascot is the Panther (or Fighting Panther). School colors are Black and Red. They are a member of the Blanchard Valley Conference.

== Ohio High School Athletic Association State Championships ==
- Boys Football – 1983, 2018
- Girls Track and Field - Event: Shot Put (2010, 2011, 2016, 2017), Discus (2013, 2017)
