= Bishop Hartley High School (Columbus, Ohio) =

Location
- 1285 Zettler Road; Columbus, (Franklin County), Ohio 43227; United States; 39°56′42″N 82°54′41″W

Information
- Type: Private
- Religious affiliation: Roman Catholic
- Patron saint: St. James
- Established: 1957
- Oversight: Diocese of Columbus
- Superintendent: Adam Dufault
- Dean: Taiwan Dawkins
- Principal: Christopher Kowalski
- Grades: 9–12
- Gender: Coeducational
- Enrollment: 715 (2020–2021)
- Average class size: 172
- Student to teacher ratio: 15:1
- Houses: 6
- Colors: Red and Blue
- Slogan: "Transforming lives through the teachings of Jesus Christ within the Catholic tradition."
- Athletics conference: Central Catholic League
- Team name: Hawks
- Rival: St.Francis Desales
- Tuition: Participating (Families who are registered and participate in a Catholic church): First child: $9,900; Second child: $8,600. Non-Participating: First child: $10,500; Second child: $9,300.
- Website: https://www.bishop-hartley.org/

Bishop Hartley High School is a private, Catholic high school located in Columbus, Ohio. The school is part of the Roman Catholic Diocese of Columbus, and serves the East side of Columbus. It typically has an enrollment between 600 and 700 students. The school bases itself upon 6 pillars: faith, service, preparation, spirit, community, and leadership.

Bishop Hartley High School has been noted for its technology program, as students are provided with an array of devices to facilitate learning. Also, each classroom is equipped with a SMART board and most homework is transferred online.

== History ==
Bishop Ready announced the plans to build a new Catholic High school in Columbus in 1954, and it was decided it would be named in memory of Bishop James J. Hartley, the fourth Bishop of Columbus. The sisters of Notre Dame de Namur- the city's first order of teaching nuns- agreed to staff the school under the direction of the Diocese of Columbus. Bishop Ready made frequent trips to the site to inspect the building progress. At the time of his death on May 2, 1957, the exterior construction work had been completed and the interior work was well underway. Although Bishop Ready did not have the pleasure of seeing his work completed, he had the satisfaction of knowing that the second unit in the high school expansion program was accomplished and that the first class had actually enrolled.

Bishop Edward G. Hettinger, consecrated the altar in the school chapel and offered the first Mass on Wednesday, September 11, 1957. The next day, September 12, the school was officially opened and Bishop Hartley High School welcomed its initial class of 177 ninth grade pupils.

== Academics ==
Bishop Hartley's college preparatory graduating requirements are: 4 years of Religion, English, and Electives (2 or more Foreign Language); 3 years of Mathematics, Science, and Social Studies; 1 year of Health and Art. Many Advanced Placement (AP) classes are offered in the curriculum including the areas of Biology, Calculus, and English. College level Calculus II and Statistics is also offered, as is PSEO at Ohio State, Columbus State, Franklin, and Ohio Dominican.

Nearly 92% of Hartley graduates attend a two or four-year program.

== House System ==
To promote pastoral care, students are divided into 6 Houses, each with about 120 students. The houses are divided into 6 mentor groups of 20 students (5 from each class) that meet every day. House polos are worn every Wednesday to show house pride, and lanyards with school IDs are worn on a daily basis. A House Cup is awarded at the end of the year based on a point system. The Houses are named after previous Diocese of Columbus High Schools.

House Name	Patron Saint(s)	Colors	Mascot	Motto
Wehrle	St. Philomena & St. Joseph	Orange & Forest Green	The Wolverine	Ad Stellas Honore Pro Maiorem Gloriam Dei - To the stars with honor, for the greater glory of God.
Victory	Virgin Mary	Navy Blue & White	The Victorious Victors	Ubi Concordia Ibi Victoria - Where there is unity, there is victory.
Aquinas	Thomas Aquinas	Court Green & Gold	The Alligator	Lux Penetret Tenebram - Let the light penetrate the darkness.
Rosary	St. Dominic	Steel Gray & Burgundy	The Rhino	Intellectu et Fide - By intellect and by faith
Sacred Heart	St. Margaret Mary Alacoque	Red & White	The Lion	Virtus et Amor - Courage and Love
The Springs	St. Catherine of Siena	Mediterranean Blue & Syracuse Orange	The Phoenix	Fontes Fluent Amore Dei - The springs flow with the love of God.

== Athletics ==
The Hartley Hawks are known for their excellent athletic program. Sports available for women include volleyball, track and field, basketball, soccer, swimming and diving, cheer leading, field hockey, lacrosse, cross country, softball, and bowling. Sports for the men include wrestling, basketball, track and field, swimming and diving, football, soccer, tennis, golf, bowling, cross country, and baseball. The Hawks also have a coed Ultimate Frisbee team, which competed at the state level in 2010.

The school has just finished work on an auxiliary gym. The Rob Telersiki and Barbra Casson (TACC) was finished in 2019 and acts as a gym, weight room, and student center. They replaced the track in the summer of 2008, and in the summer of 2009 installed an artificial turf field and LED scoreboard. In 2010, new home bleachers were added, and the old home bleachers were moved to the visiting side. The newly completed entry way, St. Gabriel's Gate, has a plaque bearing homage to Jack Ryan himself. Jack Ryan was voted by the Columbus Dispatch newspaper as the number one area high school coach of the twentieth century, and is in the Ohio High School Coaches Hall of Fame for three sports. They have also recently finished a new concession building, and a new locker room and bathroom facility. The Hawks saw recent football success at the helm of coach Brad Burchfield. They won state championships in 2010, 2015, and 2016.

A complete virtual tour of the upgrades and school is offered on the official Bishop Hartley High School website.

=== State championships ===
- Baseball – 1996
- Football – 1986, 2010, 2015, 2016
- Boys Track and Field – 1985, 1986, 1991
- Girls Track and Field – 1984, 1986, 1988, 2009, 2011
- Girls Basketball – 1976, 1978, 2000
- Girls Volleyball – 2011
