= Kirtland High School =

Public high school in Ohio

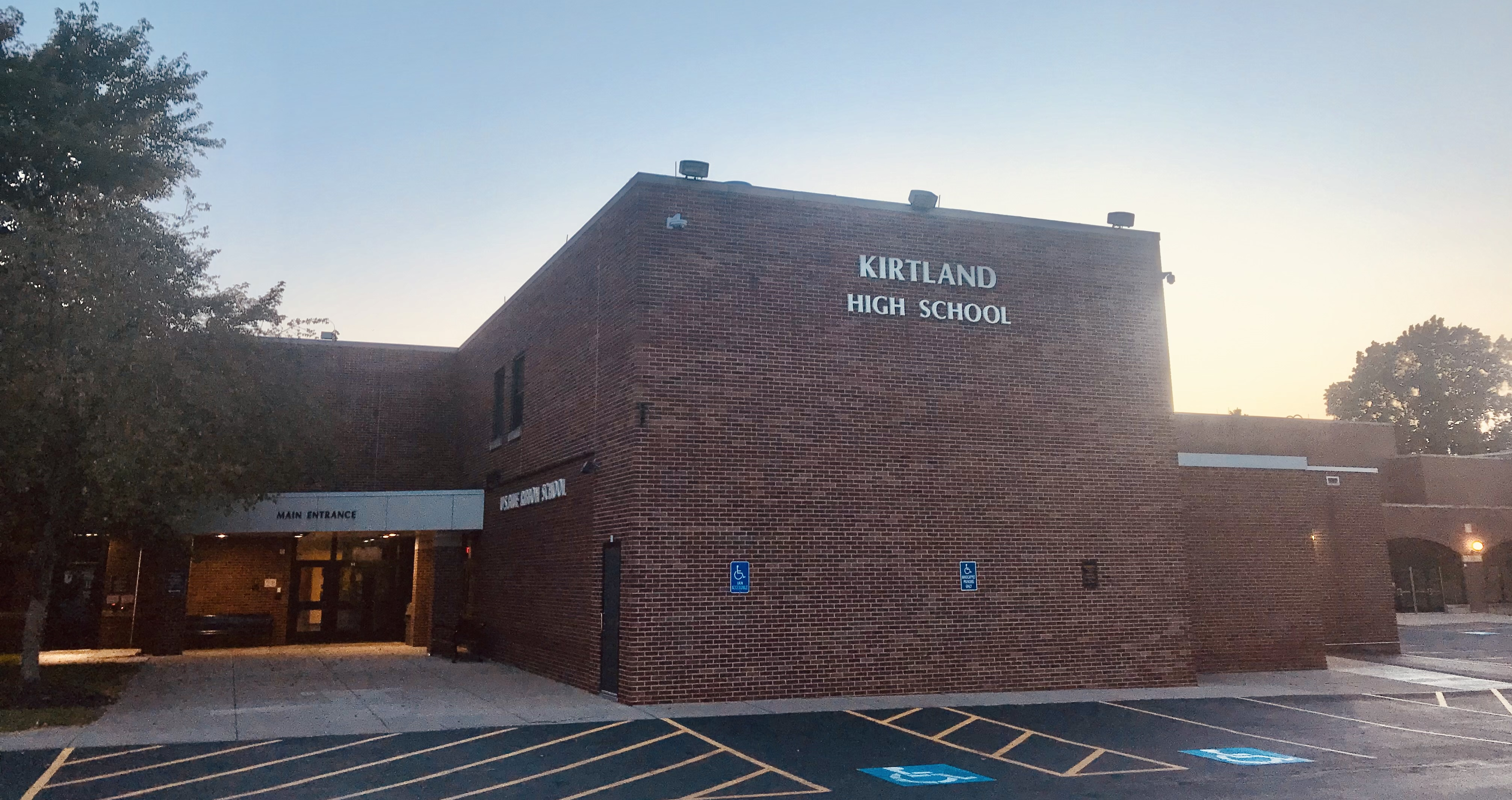
- Kirtland High School building

Location
- 9150 Chillicothe Road; Kirtland, (Lake County), Ohio 44094; United States; 41°37′17″N 81°21′39″W

Information
- Type: Public, Coeducational high school
- Opened: 1957
- School district: Kirtland Local Schools
- NCES School ID: 390478703017
- Principal: Mary Pat Pavicic
- Teaching staff: 19.00 (on an FTE basis)
- Grades: 9–12
- Enrollment: 335 (2024–25)
- Student to teacher ratio: 17.63
- Colors: Navy blue and gold
- Athletics conference: Chagrin Valley Conference
- Team name: Hornets
- Athletic Director: Matt Paul
- Website: www.kirtlandschools.org

Kirtland High School is a public high school in Kirtland, Ohio. It is the only high school in the Kirtland Local Schools District. Athletic teams are known as the Hornets, and they compete in the Ohio High School Athletic Association in the Chagrin Valley Conference.

== History ==
Kirtland High School was established in 1957 as part of a broader expansion of public education in Kirtland during the post-World War II suburban boom. Prior to this, schooling in the area centered on smaller, consolidated school buildings that served multiple grade levels. The construction of a dedicated high school reflected both population growth and the increasing demand for a modern secondary education facility within the district.

== Achievements ==
In 2005, Kirtland High School received national recognition when it was named a National Blue Ribbon School by the U.S. Department of Education.

== Extracurricular activities ==
Kirtland High School offers a wide range of extracurricular activities that allow students to pursue interests outside the classroom and develop leadership, teamwork, and community engagement skills. The school supports numerous clubs and organizations, spanning academics, service, leadership, and the arts. Clubs include Academic Challenge, Art Club, Drama Club, Foreign Language Club, Key Club, Math Club, National Honor Society, Peer Leaders, Student Council, and United Way Club, among others.

In addition to traditional clubs, Kirtland High School also provides specialized activities such as the FIRST Tech Challenge (FTC) robotics team, which gives students hands‑on experience with engineering and competitive robotics. School music programs such as Jazz Band, Marching Band, and Flag Corps also function as extracurricular opportunities that build performance and collaboration skills.

Service and leadership are emphasized through clubs such as Key Club and National Honor Society, which encourage students to participate in community service and leadership activities both within the school and in the broader community. For example, Kirtland High School’s Key Club has worked with the local Kiwanis Club to support service initiatives such as helping to establish a K‑Kids program for younger students.

Participation in extracurriculars at Kirtland High School is tied to school policy and eligibility requirements. Students wishing to participate in athletics and other extracurricular activities must meet academic standards set by the district and the Ohio High School Athletic Association, including maintaining passing grades in a minimum number of courses to remain eligible for competition and involvement.

== Athletics ==
Kirtland High School currently offers:

- Baseball
- Basketball
- Cross country
- Cheerleading
- Golf
- Football
- Soccer
- Softball
- Track and field
- Volleyball
- Wrestling

=== State championships ===
- Boys track and field – 1967
- Football – 2011, 2013, 2015, 2018, 2019, 2020, 2023, 2025
- Girls soccer – 2020
