= Ohio State Buckeyes men's basketball statistical leaders =

The Ohio State Buckeyes men's basketball statistical leaders are individual statistical leaders of the Ohio State Buckeyes men's basketball program in various categories, including points, three-pointers, assists, blocks, rebounds, and steals. Within those areas, the lists identify single-game, single-season, and career leaders. The Buckeyes represent the Ohio State University in the NCAA's Big Ten Conference.

Ohio State began competing in intercollegiate basketball in 1898. However, the school's record book does not generally list records from before the 1950s, as records from before this period are often incomplete and inconsistent. Since scoring was much lower in this era, and teams played much fewer games during a typical season, it is likely that few or no players from this era would appear on these lists anyway.

The NCAA did not officially record assists as a stat until the 1983–84 season, and blocks and steals until the 1985–86 season, but Ohio State's record books includes players in these stats before these seasons. These lists are updated through the end of the 2021–22 season.

== Scoring ==
Career
Rk	Player	Points	Seasons
1	Bruce Thornton	2,164	2022–23 2023-24 2024–25 2025–26
2	Dennis Hopson	2,096	1983–84 1984–85 1985–86 1986–87
3	Herb Williams	2,011	1977–78 1978–79 1979–80 1980–81
4	William Buford	1,990	2008–09 2009–10 2010–11 2011–12
	Jerry Lucas	1,990	1959–60 1960–61 1961–62
6	Kelvin Ransey	1,934	1976–77 1977–78 1978–79 1979–80
7	Michael Redd	1,879	1997–98 1998–99 1999–00
8	Jim Jackson	1,785	1989–90 1990–91 1991–92
9	Jay Burson	1,756	1985–86 1986–87 1987–88 1988–89
10	Deshaun Thomas	1,630	2010–11 2011–12 2012–13

Season
Rk	Player	Points	Season
1	Dennis Hopson	958	1986–87
2	Gary Bradds	735	1963–64
3	Deshaun Thomas	733	2012–13
4	Robin Freeman	723	1955–56
5	Jim Jackson	718	1991–92
6	Jerry Lucas	710	1959–60
7	Michael Redd	703	1998–99
8	Dennis Hopson	690	1985–86
9	Bruce Thornton	677	2025–26
10	D'Angelo Russell	675	2014–15

Single game
Rk	Player	Points	Season	Opponent
1	Gary Bradds	49	1963–64	Illinois
2	Gary Bradds	48	1963–64	Michigan State
	Jerry Lucas	48	1960–61	Michigan State
4	Gary Bradds	47	1963–64	Purdue
5	Robin Freeman	46	1955–56	Michigan State
6	Gary Bradds	45	1962–63	BYU
7	Robin Freeman	44	1955–56	Oklahoma
8	Robin Freeman	43	1955–56	Illinois
	Robin Freeman	43	1955–56	Loyola
	Robin Freeman	43	1955–56	Michigan State

== Rebounds ==
Career
Rk	Player	Rebounds	Seasons
1	Jerry Lucas	1,411	1959–60 1960–61 1961–62
2	Herb Williams	1,111	1977–78 1978–79 1979–80 1980–81
3	Perry Carter	989	1987–88 1988–89 1989–90 1990–91
4	Bill Hosket Jr.	910	1965–66 1966–67 1967–68
5	Terence Dials	876	2001–02 2002–03 2003–04 2004–05 2005–06
6	Clark Kellogg	872	1979–80 1980–81 1981–82
7	Luke Witte	819	1970–71 1971–72 1972–73
8	Jae'Sean Tate	771	2014–15 2015–16 2016–17 2017–18
9	Dave Sorenson	761	1967–68 1968–69 1969–70
10	Ken Johnson	739	1997–98 1998–99 1999–00 2000–01

Season
Rk	Player	Rebounds	Season
1	Jerry Lucas	499	1961–62
2	Jerry Lucas	470	1960–61
3	Jerry Lucas	442	1959–60
4	Brad Sellers	416	1985–86
5	Jared Sullinger	377	2010–11
6	Jared Sullinger	340	2011–12
7	Frank Howard	336	1956–57
8	Bill Hosket Jr.	332	1967–68
9	Luke Witte	331	1970–71
10	Herb Williams	325	1978–79

Single game
Rk	Player	Rebounds	Season	Opponent
1	Frank Howard	32	1956–57	BYU
2	Jerry Lucas	30	1961–62	Indiana
	Jerry Lucas	30	1960–61	Kentucky
	Jerry Lucas	30	1961–62	UCLA
5	Jerry Lucas	28	1959–60	Wake Forest
6	Jerry Lucas	25	1960–61	Western Kentucky
	Frank Howard	25	1956–57	Manhattan
8	Dick Furry	24	1958–59	Wisconsin
	Frank Howard	24	1955–56	Illinois
10	Bill Hosket Jr.	23	1965–66	Hardin-Simmons
	Jerry Lucas	23	1960–61	Wisconsin
	Jerry Lucas	23	1959–60	Illinois
	Dick Furry	23	1958–59	Kentucky
	Frank Howard	23	1957–58	Purdue

== Assists ==
Career
Rk	Player	Assists	Seasons
1	Aaron Craft	694	2010–11 2011–12 2012–13 2013–14
2	Jamar Butler	579	2004–05 2005–06 2006–07 2007–08
3	Bruce Thornton	541	2022–23 2023–24 2024–25 2025–26
4	Shannon Scott	528	2011–12 2012–13 2013–14 2014–15
5	Kelvin Ransey	516	1976–77 1977–78 1978–79 1979–80
6	Curtis Wilson	475	1983–84 1985–86 1986–87 1987–88
7	Mark Baker	424	1989–90 1990–91 1991–92
8	Troy Taylor	421	1981–82 1982–83 1983–84 1984–85
9	Ronnie Stokes	419	1981–82 1982–83 1983–84 1984–85
10	Evan Turner	414	2007–08 2008–09 2009–10

Season
Rk	Player	Assists	Season
1	Mike Conley Jr.	238	2006–07
2	Jamar Butler	219	2007–08
3	Shannon Scott	207	2014–15
4	Curtis Wilson	188	1987–88
5	Evan Turner	185	2009–10
6	Aaron Craft	181	2011–12
7	Aaron Craft	177	2010–11
	Kelvin Ransey	177	1979–80
9	D'Angelo Russell	175	2014–15
10	Aaron Craft	172	2012–13

Single game
Rk	Player	Assists	Season	Opponent
1	Shannon Scott	16	2014–15	Sacred Heart
2	Aaron Craft	15	2010–11	George Mason
3	Shannon Scott	14	2014–15	Marquette
	Curtis Wilson	14	1987–88	Purdue
5	JaQuan Lyle	13	2015–16	Minnesota
	Kelvin Ransey	13	1979–80	Northwestern
7	Shannon Scott	12	2014–15	NC A&T
	Jamar Butler	12	2007–08	UMBC
	Scoonie Penn	12	1999–00	Florida A&M
10	JaQuan Lyle	11	2016–17	Jackson State
	JaQuan Lyle	11	2015–16	Rutgers
	D'Angelo Russell	11	2014–15	Rutgers
	Shannon Scott	11	2014–15	UMass-Lowell
	Evan Turner	11	2009–10	Lipscomb
	Jamar Butler	11	2007–08	Northwestern
	Damon Stringer	11	1995–96	CCSU
	Mark Baker	11	1990–91	Wisconsin
	Curtis Wilson	11	1986–87	Florida International
	Larry Bolden	11	1976–77	Northwestern

== Steals ==
Career
Rk	Player	Steals	Seasons
1	Aaron Craft	337	2010–11 2011–12 2012–13 2013–14
2	Shannon Scott	211	2011–12 2012–13 2013–14 2014–15
3	Jay Burson	204	1985–86 1986–87 1987–88 1988–89
4	David Lighty	191	2006–07 2007–08 2008–09 2009–10 2010–11
5	Dennis Hopson	164	1983–84 1984–85 1985–86 1986–87
6	Evan Turner	159	2007–08 2008–09 2009–10
7	Jamaal Brown	158	1988–89 1989–90 1990–91 1991–92
	Ronnie Stokes	158	1981–82 1982–83 1983–84 1984–85
9	Troy Taylor	155	1981–82 1982–83 1983–84 1984–85
10	Curtis Wilson	153	1983–84 1985–86 1986–87 1987–88

Season
Rk	Player	Steals	Season
1	Aaron Craft	98	2011–12
2	Aaron Craft	89	2013–14
3	Mike Conley Jr.	87	2006–07
4	Aaron Craft	77	2012–13
5	Curtis Wilson	74	1986–87
6	Aaron Craft	73	2010–11
7	Je'Kel Foster	72	2005–06
8	Shannon Scott	71	2013–14
	Dennis Hopson	71	1986–87
10	Scoonie Penn	70	1998–99

Single game
Rk	Player	Steals	Season	Opponent
1	Troy Taylor	8	1983–84	St. Joseph's
2	Jae'Sean Tate	7	2015–16	Mercer
	Shannon Scott	7	2014–15	NC A&T
	Aaron Craft	7	2013–14	American
	Aaron Craft	7	2010–11	Iowa
	Kelvin Ransey	7	1977–78	Minnesota
7	Shannon Scott	6	2012–13	UNC Asheville
	Aaron Craft	6	2013–14	Iowa
	Aaron Craft	6	2012–13	Iona
	Aaron Craft	6	2011–12	Cincinnati
	Aaron Craft	6	2011–12	Minnesota
	Aaron Craft	6	2010–11	Indiana
	Aaron Craft	6	2010–11	Purdue
	Je'Kel Foster	6	2005–06	Purdue
	Je'Kel Foster	6	2005–06	Gardner-Webb
	Tony Stockman	6	2003–04	Northwestern
	Brent Darby	6	2002–03	Iowa
	Scoonie Penn	6	1999–00	Vermont
	Scoonie Penn	6	1998–99	Indiana
	Michael Redd	6	1998–99	Miami (FL)
	Carlos Davis	6	1997–98	Penn State
	Derek Anderson	6	1993–94	Tennessee Tech
	Curtis Wilson	6	1986–87	Siena
	Curtis Wilson	6	1986–87	Indiana
	Jerry Francis	6	1986–87	Michigan
	Ronnie Stokes	6	1983–84	Iowa
	Clark Kellogg	6	1981–82	Florida
	Troy Taylor	6	1981–82	Florida

== Blocks ==
Career
Rk	Player	Blocks	Seasons
1	Ken Johnson	444	1997–98 1998–99 1999–00 2000–01
2	Herb Williams	328	1977–78 1978–79 1979–80 1980–81
3	Dallas Lauderdale	213	2007–08 2008–09 2009–10 2010–11
4	Amir Williams	187	2011–12 2012–13 2013–14 2014–15
	Brad Sellers	187	1984–85 1985–86
6	Jim Smith	169	1977–78 1978–79 1979–80 1980–81
7	E.J. Liddell	143	2019–20 2020–21 2021–22
8	Granville Waiters	136	1979–80 1980–81 1981–82 1982–83
9	Lawrence Funderburke	131	1991–92 1992–93 1993–94
10	Keita Bates-Diop	128	2014–15 2015–16 2016–17 2017–18

Season
Rk	Player	Blocks	Season
1	Ken Johnson	161	1999–00
2	Ken Johnson	125	2000–01
3	Greg Oden	105	2006–07
4	Ken Johnson	100	1998–99
5	Brad Sellers	97	1985–86
6	Brad Sellers	90	1984–85
	Herb Williams	90	1979–80
8	E.J. Liddell	83	2021–22
	Felix Okpara	83	2023–24
10	Herb Williams	81	1978–79

Single game
Rk	Player	Blocks	Season	Opponent
1	Ken Johnson	11	1999–00	Iowa
	Ken Johnson	11	1999–00	St. John's
3	Ken Johnson	9	2000–01	UMass
	Brad Sellers	9	1985–86	Louisiana Tech
	Herb Williams	9	1979–80	Iowa
6	E. J. Liddell	8	2021–22	Xavier
	Dallas Lauderdale	8	2010–11	NCA&T
	Dallas Lauderdale	8	2009–10	UCSB
	Ken Johnson	8	1999–00	Minnesota
	Ken Johnson	8	1999–00	Penn State
	Ken Johnson	8	1999–00	American
	Ken Johnson	8	1999–00	Eastern Kentucky
	Granville Waiters	8	1982–83	West Virginia
	Herb Williams	8	1980–81	Iowa
	Herb Williams	8	1977–78	Iowa
