= Jon Diebler =

American basketball player (born 1988)

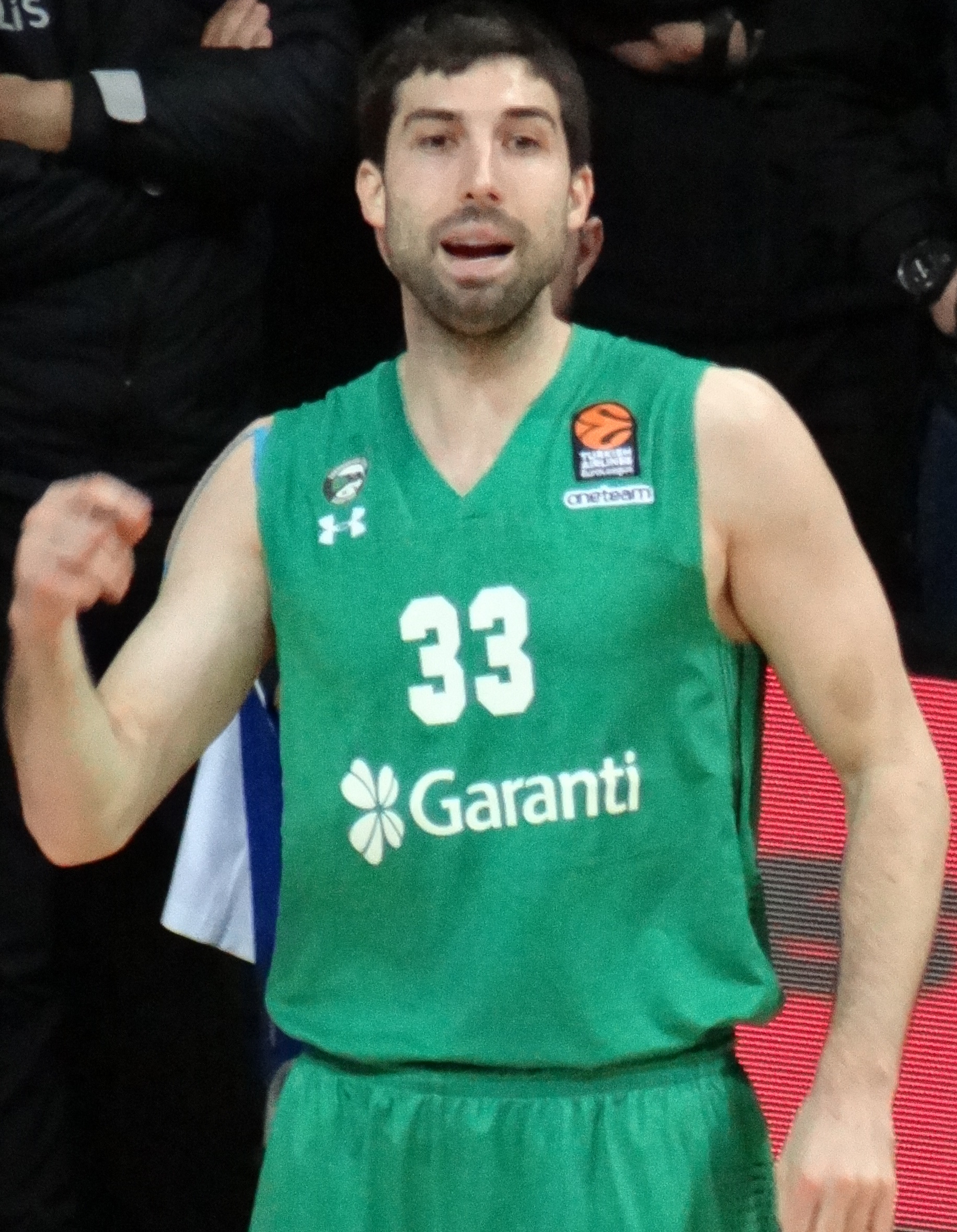
- Diebler with Darüşşafaka in 2018

Butler Bulldogs
- Title: Assistant coach
- Conference: Big East Conference

Personal information
- Born: June 22, 1988 (age 38) Sylvania, Ohio, U.S.
- Listed height: 6 ft 6 in (1.98 m)
- Listed weight: 205 lb (93 kg)

Career information
- High school: Upper Sandusky (Upper Sandusky, Ohio)
- College: Ohio State (2007–2011)
- NBA draft: 2011: 2nd round, 51st overall pick
- Drafted by: Portland Trail Blazers
- Playing career: 2011–2021
- Position: Shooting guard
- Number: 9, 32, 33
- Coaching career: 2022–present

Career history

Playing
- 2011–2012: Panionios
- 2012–2015: Pınar Karşıyaka
- 2015–2016: Anadolu Efes
- 2016–2017: Galatasaray Odeabank
- 2017–2018: Beşiktaş
- 2018–2019: Darüşşafaka
- 2020–2021: Hapoel Tel Aviv

Coaching
- 2022–2024: Butler (Dir. of Recruiting)
- 2024–present: Butler (assistant)

Career highlights
- Turkish President's Cup winner (2015); Turkish League champion (2015); Third-team All-Big Ten (2011); Fourth-team Parade All-American (2007); Ohio Mr. Basketball (2007)
- Stats at Basketball Reference

Jon Keith Diebler (born June 22, 1988) is an American former professional basketball player who is an assistant coach for the Butler Bulldogs of the Big East Conference. He played four seasons of college basketball for the Ohio State Buckeyes.

== High school career ==
Diebler played his freshman season along with his older brother Jake at Fostoria High School for his father, head coach Keith Diebler. The family left when Keith accepted the head coaching position at Upper Sandusky High School, which Jon attended for his remaining three seasons.

In Jon's sophomore year, the Upper Sandusky Rams won the state championship, coached by his father. He scored 77 points in a 105–100 win over Tiffin Columbian as a junior. As a senior, he averaged 40.8 points, 12.3 rebounds, and six assists per game. Diebler ended his high school career with 3,208 points, more than Ohio high school greats Luke Kennard (2,977), Jay Burson (2,958), LeBron James (2,646), Bob Huggins (2,438), Jerry Lucas (2,438), Jamar Butler (2,412) and Jim Jackson (2,328).

He won Ohio's Mr. Basketball his senior year and despite having his nose broken in three places on a layup attempt in the final quarter of the Division II regional championship game, he helped the team reach the state finals game and scored 48 points in a two-point loss to Dayton Dunbar. It was the third-highest scoring effort ever in an OHSAA state championship game.

Considered a four-star recruit by Rivals.com, Diebler was listed as the No. 14 shooting guard and the No. 60 player in the nation in 2007.

== College career ==
On March 13, 2010, Diebler surpassed Jamar Butler for the Ohio State record for 3-point field goals made. Diebler finished the 2009–10 season averaging 37.2 minutes per game. On March 1, 2011, he made 10 3-pointers in a row while finishing 10 for 12, breaking the Ohio State record for most 3-pointers in a game. On March 6, 2011, during Ohio State's senior day, Diebler made 7 3-pointers, finishing with 27 points against Wisconsin.

Diebler started 115 games during his time at OSU, including every game since the start of his sophomore year.

== Professional career ==
=== Panionios (2011–2012) ===
In August 2011, Diebler signed a one-year contract with the Greek Basket League club Panionios.

=== Pınar Karşıyaka (2012–2015) ===
On July 25, 2012, Diebler signed a contract with the Turkish club Pınar Karşıyaka. With Karşıyaka, he won the Turkish Super League championship of the 2014–15 season.

=== Anadolu Efes (2015–2016) ===
On July 23, 2015, Diebler signed a one-year contract with the Turkish club Anadolu Efes.

=== Galatasaray (2016–2017) ===
On July 8, 2016, Diebler signed with the Turkish club Galatasaray Odeabank.

=== Beşiktaş (2017–2018) ===
On June 23, 2017, Diebler joined Beşiktaş on a one-year deal. He averaged 11.5 points per game in the Basketball Champions League.

=== Darüşşafaka (2018–2019) ===
On August 18, 2018, Diebler signed a one-year deal with Darüşşafaka of the EuroLeague.

=== Hapoel Tel Aviv (2020–2021) ===
On September 6, 2020, Diebler signed with Hapoel Tel Aviv of the Israeli Basketball Premier League. On September 27, 2021, Diebler announced his retirement from professional basketball.

Diebler joined Carmen's Crew, composed primarily of Ohio State alumni, in The Basketball Tournament 2020. He scored 11 points as the team was upset by House of Paign, 76–68, in the first round.

=== NBA draft rights ===
On June 6, 2011, Diebler traveled to Portland, to participate in a pre-draft workout with the Portland Trail Blazers. Diebler was then drafted in the 2nd round of the 2011 NBA draft by the Trail Blazers. On July 20, 2012, Diebler's draft rights were traded to the Houston Rockets, in a three team deal.

On January 22, 2019, his draft rights were included in a trade to the Chicago Bulls, along with Carmelo Anthony and cash considerations, in exchange for the right to Tadija Dragićević.

== Coaching career ==
On April 19, 2022, Diebler was hired as the director of recruiting for the Butler Bulldogs.

== Career statistics ==
Legend
GP	Games played	GS	Games started	MPG	Minutes per game
FG%	Field-goal percentage	3P%	3-point field-goal percentage	FT%	Free-throw percentage
RPG	Rebounds per game	APG	Assists per game	SPG	Steals per game
BPG	Blocks per game	PPG	Points per game	PIR	Performance index rating
**Bold**	Career high

=== EuroLeague ===
*	Led the league

Year	Team	GP	GS	MPG	FG%	3P%	FT%	RPG	APG	SPG	BPG	PPG	PIR
2015–16	Anadolu Efes	21	**18**	**26.7**	**.515**	.495	.852	**1.9**	**1.6**	.4	.0	**10.2**	**8.8**
2016–17	Galatasaray	**29**	2	19.0	.504	**.538***	.857	**1.9**	1.4	**.5**	—	6.5	7.3
2018–19	Darüşşafaka	28	7	18.3	.355	.363	**.923**	1.3	1.2	.4	**.1**	4.3	3.4
Career		78	27	20.8	.463	.471	.869	1.7	1.4	.4	.0	6.7	6.3
