= Ohio Mr. Basketball =

Honor awarded to High school basketball players

This is a list of players who have won the title of Ohio Mr. Basketball.

There are two awards, one awarded by the Associated Press, and one awarded by the Ohio High School Basketball Coaches Association.

== Award winners ==
=== Associated Press Mr. Basketball ===
Associated Press Mr. Basketball
Year	Player	High School	College	NBA Draft
1988, 1989	Jimmy Jackson	Toledo Macomber	Ohio State	1992 NBA draft: 1st round, 4th overall by the Dallas Mavericks
1990	Bob Patton Jr.	Youngstown Liberty	Stanford	
1991, 1992	Greg Simpson	Lima Senior	Ohio State	
1993	Geno Ford	Cambridge	Ohio	
1994	Aaron Hutchins	Lima Central Catholic	Marquette	
1995	Damon Stringer	Cleveland Heights	Cleveland State; Ohio State	
1996	Jason Collier	Springfield Catholic	Indiana; Georgia Tech	2000 NBA draft: 1st round, 15th overall by the Milwaukee Bucks
1997	Kenny Gregory	Independence	Kansas	
1998	William "Sonny" Johnson	Garfield Heights	Cleveland State; Ohio	
1999	Emmanuel Smith	Euclid		
2000 (tie)	Chester Mason	Cleveland South	Miami	
2000 (tie)	Tony Stockman	Medina	Clemson; Ohio State	
2001, 2002, 2003	LeBron James	St. Vincent – St. Mary	None	2003 NBA draft: 1st round, 1st overall by the Cleveland Cavaliers
2004	Jamar Butler	Lima Shawnee	Ohio State	
2005, 2006	O. J. Mayo	North College Hill	USC	2008 NBA draft: 1st round, 3rd overall by the Minnesota Timberwolves
2007	Jon Diebler	Upper Sandusky	Ohio State	2011 NBA draft: 2nd round, 51st overall by the Portland Trail Blazers
2008	William Buford	Toledo Libbey	Ohio State	
2009, 2010	Jared Sullinger	Northland	Ohio State	2012 NBA draft: 1st round, 21st overall by the Boston Celtics
2011	Trey Burke	Northland	Michigan	2013 NBA draft: 1st round, 9th overall by the Minnesota Timberwolves
2012	Justin Fritts	Mentor	Wheeling Jesuit	
2013	Marc Loving	St. John's Jesuit	Ohio State	
2014, 2015	Luke Kennard	Franklin	Duke	2017 NBA draft: 1st round, 12th overall by the Detroit Pistons
2016	Zavier Simpson	Lima Senior	Michigan	
2017	Kaleb Wesson	Westerville South	Ohio State	
2018	Dane Goodwin	Upper Arlington	Notre Dame	
2019	Samari Curtis	Xenia	Nebraska; Evansville; Bowling Green	
2020	VonCameron Davis	Walnut Ridge	Kent State	
2021	Malaki Branham	St. Vincent – St. Mary	Ohio State	2022 NBA draft: 1st round, 20th overall by the San Antonio Spurs
2022	Gabe Cupps	Centerville	Indiana Ohio State	
2023	Devin Royal	Pickerington Central	Ohio State	
2024	Colin White	Ottawa-Glandorf	Ohio State	
2025	Marcus Johnson	Garfield Heights	South Carolina	
2026	Marcus Johnson (2)	Garfield Heights	South Carolina	

==== Schools with multiple winners ====
School	Number of Awards	Years
St. Vincent–St. Mary	4	2001, 2002, 2003, 2021
Garfield Heights	3	1998, 2025, 2026
Lima Senior	3	1991, 1992, 2016
Northland	3	2009, 2010, 2011
Franklin	2	2014, 2015
North College Hill	2	2005, 2006
Toledo Macomber	2	1988, 1989

==== Colleges with multiple winners ====
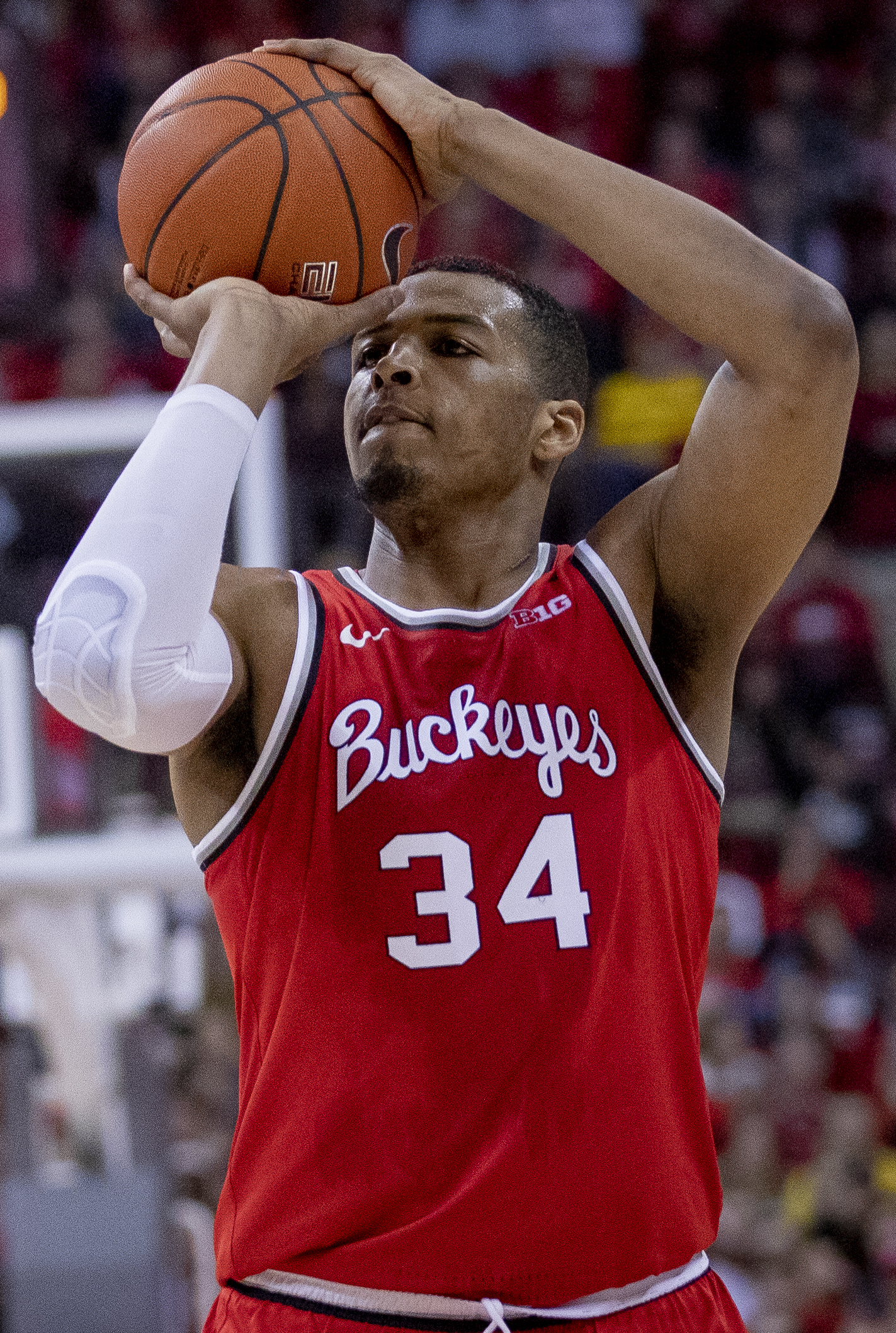
Kaleb Wesson

College	Number of Awards	Years
Ohio State	17	1988, 1989, 1991, 1992, 1995, 2000, 2004, 2007, 2008, 2009, 2010, 2013, 2017, 2021, 2023, 2024
South Carolina	2	2025, 2026
Indiana	2	1996, 2022
Michigan	2	2011, 2016
Duke	2	2014, 2015
USC Trojans	2	2005, 2006
Cleveland State	2	1995, 1998
Ohio	2	1993, 1998

=== OHSBCA Mr. Basketball ===
The Ohio High School Basketball Coaches Association selects Mr. Basketball in Boys Basketball each year. The procedures for the selection of Mr. Basketball is (1) that the Player must be nominated by a district director or Officer, (2) Nominees can be a senior or underclassman, (3) Each player's stats will be discussed among the district directors and Officers and (4) District Directors will vote to determine the winner.

Year	Player	High School	College	NBA Draft
1989	Jimmy Jackson	Toledo Macomber	Ohio State	1992 NBA draft: 1st round, 4th overall by the Dallas Mavericks
1990	Tyrice Walker	Hamilton	Xavier	
1991, 1992	Greg Simpson	Lima Senior	Ohio State	
1993	Damon Flint	Cincinnati Woodward	Cincinnati	
1994	Byron Gladden	Lorain Admiral King	Virginia Commonwealth	
1995	Shaun Stonerook	Westerville North	Ohio State/Ohio	
1996	Jason Collier	Springfield Catholic	Indiana/Georgia Tech	2000 NBA draft: 1st round, 15th overall by the Milwaukee Bucks
1997	Andre Hutson	Trotwood-Madison	Michigan State	
1998	Keith McLeod	Canton McKinley	Bowling Green	
1999	Brooks Hall	Troy	Dayton	
2000	Romain Sato	Dayton Christian	Xavier	2004 NBA draft: 2nd round, 52nd overall by the San Antonio Spurs
2001, 2002, 2003	LeBron James	St. Vincent – St. Mary	None	2003 NBA draft: 1st round, 1st overall by the Cleveland Cavaliers
2004	Jamar Butler	Lima Shawnee	Ohio State	
2005	Jamelle Cornley	Columbus Brookhaven	Penn State	
2006	Raymar Morgan	Canton McKinley	Michigan State	
2007	Jon Diebler	Upper Sandusky	Ohio State	
2008	William Buford	Toledo Libbey	Ohio State	
2009, 2010	Jared Sullinger	Northland	Ohio State	2012 NBA draft: 1st round, 21st overall by the Boston Celtics
2011	Travis Trice	Wayne	Michigan State	
2012	Terry Rozier	Shaker Heights	Louisville	2015 NBA draft: 1st round, 16th overall by the Boston Celtics
2013	Marc Loving	St. John's Jesuit	Ohio State	
2015, 2014	Luke Kennard	Franklin	Duke	2017 NBA draft: 1st round, 12th overall by the Detroit Pistons
2016	Zavier Simpson	Lima Senior	Michigan	
2017	Kaleb Wesson	Westerville South	Ohio State	
2018	Dane Goodwin	Upper Arlington	Notre Dame	
2019	Ben Roderick	Olentangy Liberty	Ohio University	
2020	Von Cameron Davis	Walnut Ridge	Kent State	

==== Schools with multiple winners ====
School	Number of Awards	Years
Lima Senior	3	1991, 1992, 2016
St. Vincent–St. Mary	3	2001, 2002, 2003
Franklin	2	2014, 2015
Northland	2	2009, 2010
Canton McKinley	2	1998, 2006

==== Colleges with multiple winners ====
College	Number of Awards	Years
Ohio State	11	1989, 1991, 1992, 1995, 2004, 2007, 2008, 2009, 2010, 2013, 2017
Michigan State	3	1997, 2006, 2011
Duke	2	2014, 2015
Xavier	2	1990, 2000
