= Bay Shore, New York =

- Hamlet and census-designated place
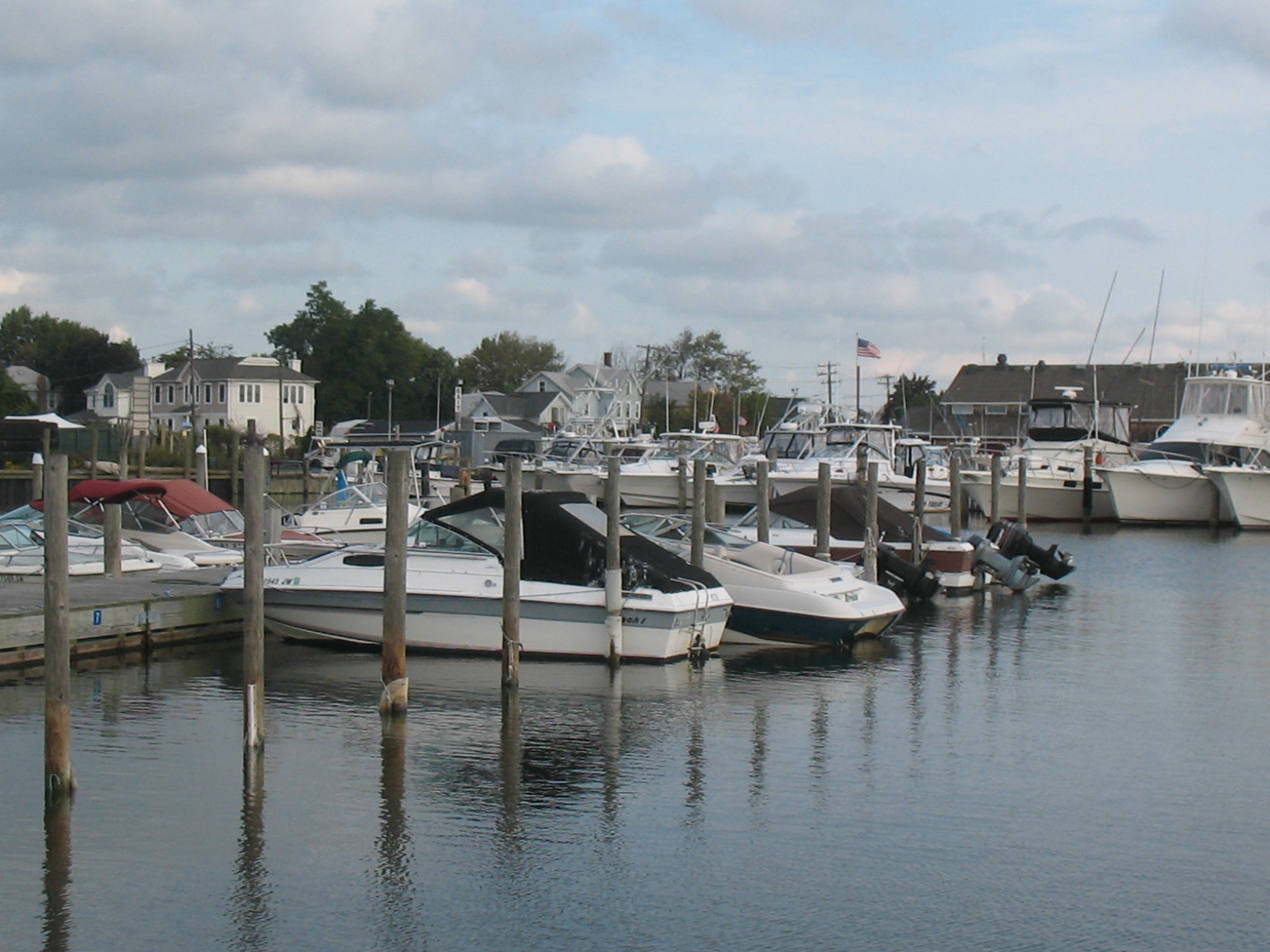
- Bay Shore Marina
- Motto: The Heart of the South Shore
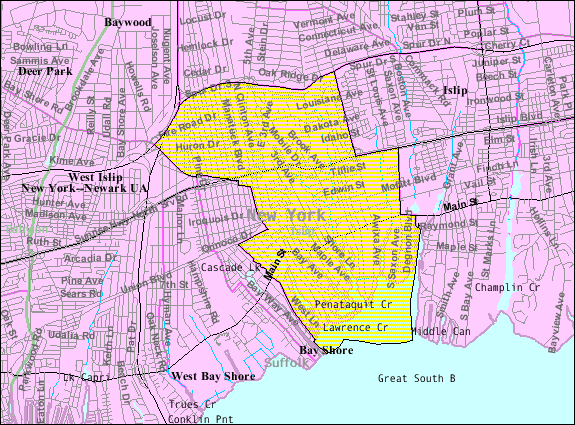
- U.S. Census map

- Location within the State of New York
- Coordinates: 40°43′47″N 73°15′13″W
- Country: United States
- State: New York
- County: Suffolk
- Town: Islip

Area
  - Total: 6.72 sq mi (17.41 km^{2})
  - Land: 5.68 sq mi (14.71 km^{2})
  - Water: 1.05 sq mi (2.71 km^{2})
- Elevation: 16 ft (5 m)

Population (2020)
  - Total: 29,244
  - Density: 5,150.2/sq mi (1,988.51/km^{2})
- Time zone: UTC−05:00 (Eastern Time Zone)
  - Summer (DST): UTC−04:00
- ZIP Code: 11706
- Area codes: 631, 934
- FIPS code: 36-04935
- GNIS feature ID: 0943194

Bay Shore is a hamlet and census-designated place (CDP) in the Town of Islip, New York, United States. It is situated on the South Shore of Long Island, adjoining the Great South Bay. The population of the CDP was 29,244 at the time of the 2020 census.

== History ==
Bay Shore is one of the older hamlets on Long Island. Sagtikos Manor, located in West Bay Shore, was built around 1697. It was used as a British armed forces headquarters, at the time of the Battle of Long Island during the Revolutionary War. President Washington stayed at the Sagtikos Manor during his tour of Long Island in 1790.

The land that would become Bay Shore proper was purchased from the Secatogue Native Americans in 1708 by local school teacher John Mowbray for "several eel spears".

In 1840, Bay Shore had one of two churches in the entirety of Islip Town. This was a methodist church built in 1828. In 1850, Bay Shore was one of only two proper hamlets in the entire Town of Islip, along with Sayville.

The hamlet's name has changed over time: Early European settlers referred to the area first as Penataquit and later as Awixa; both were names used by the indigenous Secatogue. For reasons never documented, the name was changed in the early 19th century to Sodom. In 1842 there was a further name change to Mechanicsville, then a return in 1849 to Penataquit. The change to Penataquit coinciding with a change in the name of the post office to Penataquit. The name Penataquit proved unpopular because it was difficult to spell, and the name of the hamlet and post office was changed to Bay Shore in 1868.

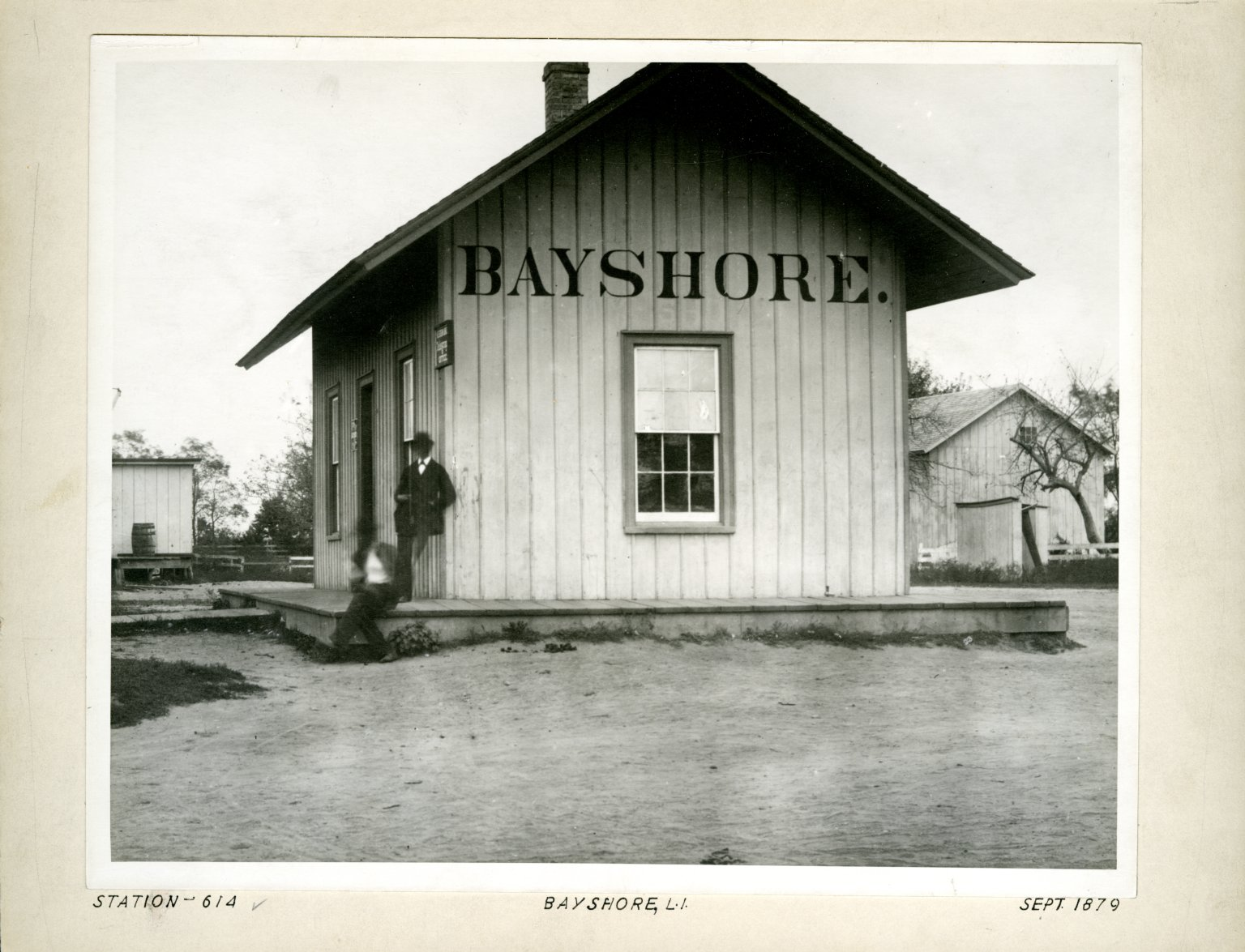
George Bradford Brainerd (American, 1845–1887). Station, Bay Shore, Long Island, September 1879. Collodion silver glass wet plate negative. Brooklyn Museum

=== 19th and early 20th centuries ===
Bay Shore became renowned in the late 19th century for its shopping district and resorts. The rural hamlet became popular with affluent New Yorkers looking to escape the city to white sand beaches of the Great South Bay and the fishing villages of Fire Island. It was a tourist spot on weekends and during the summer, in large part because the newly built Long Island Rail Road enabled easy access from New York City. During World War I it became the headquarters of the First Yale Unit, a United States Naval Air Reserve unit.

=== Post-World War II development ===
The population of Bay Shore increased significantly after World War II: from the mid-1950s through mid-1960s, a variety of housing developments were constructed on farms and unused woodlands. Those developments were settled largely by working and middle class first-time home buyers from New York City.

Despite strains on the community brought on by sudden, substantial growth, the hamlet remained sound. Main Street continued to be one of the region's most popular shopping destinations.

=== 1970s and 1980s ===
Bay Shore suffered a decline beginning in the late 1970s. Without a local government, residents were unable to make decisions that were instead left to the Town of Islip and Suffolk County. The population density and demographics shifted when rezoning permitted businesses, rental properties and multi-family dwellings where previously only single-family houses had been allowed. Many Main Street storefronts became vacant. Construction of the South Shore Mall two miles north of Main Street took business away from the small businesses on Main Street. Deinstitutionalization caused psychiatric patients of the nearby Pilgrim State Hospital to be hastily relocated to rental housing downtown, often without sufficient professional support.

=== Restoration and the hamlet today ===
Work to restore Bay Shore has been ongoing since the 1980s. Upscale townhouses and condominiums were built in gated communities on the grounds of old estates. The former Bay Shore Theater and one-time opera house was renovated and expanded into a YMCA. The redevelopment of Main Street is ongoing; efforts include new sidewalks, antique-style streetlights, new landscaping and restored parks. Main Street has regained much of its popularity. There are many attractive new restaurants, clothing boutiques and other stores and offices. The Bay Shore Beautification Society transformed an empty lot on Main Street into a meditation garden in 2007, that has since been recognized for its excellent design.

A US battleship was to have been placed at the Bay Shore Marina. However, the water was deemed too shallow, and instead a decommissioned WWII torpedo was converted into a monument. The aging bulkhead and other dock structures at the marina were rebuilt. Over the summer of 2010, a new water park was built at Benjamin Beach, which sits adjacent to the marina, with a renovated bath house and new landscaping.

Abandoned department stores at the Gardiner Manor Mall were razed to make new use of the property. Most of the old mall and adjacent buildings were replaced by new commercial and retail spaces, including a Lowe's home improvement center, a Target and a BMW dealership.

In 2008 and 2009, new condominiums replaced dilapidated housing next to the train station. Additionally, a pedestrian bridge was built over the tracks, and the old tunnel between platforms was closed.

== Geography ==
The Bay Shore CDP is located on the South Shore of Long Island, approximately 42 miles (68 km) from Manhattan and 79 miles (127 km) from Montauk. According to the United States Census Bureau, the CDP has a total area of 5.5 square miles (14.3 km^{2}), of which 5.4 square miles (13.9 km^{2}) is land and 0.15 square miles (0.4 km^{2}) (2.88%) is water.

The northern boundary of the Bay Shore CDP is the Southern State Parkway. North of the parkway is the CDP of North Bay Shore.

The village of Brightwaters is west of Bay Shore, and east of West Bay Shore and south of a portion of the Bay Shore CDP; The Great South Bay is to the south. The village separates Bay Shore proper from West Bay Shore.

== Demographics ==
Historical population
Census	Pop.	Note	%±
1990	21,279		—
2000	23,852		12.1%
2010	26,337		10.4%
2020	29,244		11.0%
U.S. Decennial Census

=== 2020 census ===
As of the 2020 census, Bay Shore had a population of 29,244. The median age was 37.7 years. 22.9% of residents were under the age of 18 and 13.4% of residents were 65 years of age or older. For every 100 females there were 95.8 males, and for every 100 females age 18 and over there were 93.4 males age 18 and over.

100.0% of residents lived in urban areas, while 0.0% lived in rural areas.

There were 9,667 households in Bay Shore, of which 35.7% had children under the age of 18 living in them. Of all households, 42.3% were married-couple households, 19.8% were households with a male householder and no spouse or partner present, and 30.7% were households with a female householder and no spouse or partner present. About 25.7% of all households were made up of individuals and 11.0% had someone living alone who was 65 years of age or older.

There were 10,126 housing units, of which 4.5% were vacant. The homeowner vacancy rate was 1.4% and the rental vacancy rate was 3.6%.

Racial composition as of the 2020 census
Race	Number	Percent
White	12,096	41.4%
Black or African American	5,375	18.4%
American Indian and Alaska Native	361	1.2%
Asian	1,258	4.3%
Native Hawaiian and Other Pacific Islander	18	0.1%
Some other race	6,239	21.3%
Two or more races	3,897	13.3%
Hispanic or Latino (of any race)	11,127	38.0%

=== 2010 census ===
As of the census of 2010, there were 26,337, 9,064 households, and 6,079 families residing in the CDP. The population density was 4,877.2 inhabitants per square mile (1,883.1/km^{2}). There were 9,663 housing units at an average density of 1,789.4 per square mile (690.9/km^{2}). The racial makeup of the CDP was 61.0% White, 19.6% African American, 0.7% Native American, 3.2% Asian, 0.04% Pacific Islander, 11.3% from some other race, and 4.2% from two or more races. Hispanics of any race constituted 30.8%.

There were 9,064 households, out of which 31.3% had children under the age of 18 living with them, 42.7% were headed by married couples living together, 17.9% had a female householder with no husband present, and 32.9% were non-families. 27.0% of all households were made up of individuals, and 11.3% were individuals 65 years of age or older living alone. The average household size was 2.88 and the average family size was 3.45.

The population was spread out, with 24.6% under the age of 18, 9.0% from 18 to 24, 27.8% from 25 to 44, 26.6% from 45 to 64, and 11.9% who were 65 years of age or older. The median age was 37.4 years. For every 100 females, there were 94.1 males. For every 100 females age 18 and over, there were 91.5 males.

=== 2009–2011 American Community Survey ===
For the period 2009–2011, the estimated median income for a household in the CDP was $64,681, and the median income for a family was $74,223. Males had a median income of $44,816 versus $38,744 for females. The per capita income for the CDP was $26,847. About 2.8% of families and 5.8% of the population were below the poverty line, including 3.1% of those under age 18 and 9.5% of those age 65 or over.

== Education ==
The Bay Shore Union Free School District includes most of the census-designated place, with Bay Shore High School as the local high school.

The predecessor of the modern Bay Shore Union Free School District was the first school district in Islip Town. The first school in the district was likely built in 1825.

Other parts of the CDP, as of the 2020 US Census, extend into Islip Union Free School District, Brentwood Union Free School District, and West Islip Union Free School District. The shape of Bay Shore CDP differed in the 2010 and previous censuses, and so that boundary did not extend into West Islip School District.

In addition, Bay Shore Parochial School of St. Patrick's Roman Catholic Church (of the Roman Catholic Diocese of Rockville Centre) offers elementary education covering grades K–8 courses and curriculum. It opened in 1921.

== Infrastructure ==
=== Roads ===
Bay Shore is accessible by major roads on Long Island such as:

- NY 27A, known by several names within the Bay Shore limits, including Main Street (Bay Shore), South Country Road (Brightwaters) and Montauk Highway (West Bay Shore)
- CR 50 (Union Boulevard)
- NY 27, known as Sunrise Highway. An alternate name is POW/MIA Memorial Highway, but this name is rarely used.
- Southern State Parkway, exits 41S, 42N or exit 42S
- CR 13 (Fifth Avenue), runs from CR-4 (Commack Road) in Commack to Main Street in Bay Shore. Between NY 27A and CR 13A, it runs northbound only parallel to Clinton Avenue.
- CR 13A (Clinton Avenue), runs southbound only from CR-13 (Fifth Avenue) to Main Street in Bay Shore.
- CR 57, Howell's Road/Bay Shore Road, runs from NY 231 in Deer Park to Third Avenue in Bay Shore.

=== Buses ===
There are many bus stops in Bay Shore on different lines, provided by Suffolk County Transit.

=== Train ===
Bay Shore station is a stop on the Montauk Branch of the Long Island Rail Road. There is also a team track for service to off-line freight customers, should the need arise. LIRR trains travel westward toward Babylon and New York City, and eastward toward Montauk. The Bay Shore stop is a popular stop for visitors traveling to and from Fire Island.

=== Ferries ===
Bay Shore has terminals for the Ferries to Fire Island, serving Atlantique, Dunewood, Fair Harbor, Kismet, Ocean Bay Park, Ocean Beach, Point-O-Woods, Saltaire, and Seaview, and smaller hamlets. They are located at the southernmost end of Maple Avenue. Some daily ferries to Atlantique also make a stop at the Bay Shore Marina, which is across the canal from the Maple Avenue ferries.

== Emergency services ==
=== Fire department ===
Since 1891, Bay Shore has been served by volunteer firefighters of the Bay Shore Fire Department. The department is headquartered on Fifth Avenue, and two additional stations are located on Union Boulevard and East William Street. The department also serves Brightwaters and West Bay Shore.

The Bay Shore Fire Department is made up of members from five companies. In 1885, Bay Shore Hook & Ladder Company #1 was formed. In 1891, within a few weeks of each other, Penataquit Hose Company #1 and the Bay Shore Hose Company #1 were formed. The three companies were soon merged to form the Bay Shore Fire Department that same year. In 1895, the Bay Shore Fire Patrol Company was formed. Finally, the Bay Shore Engine Company #1 was formed in 1925. Briefly, during World War II, a sixth company was formed, Victory Engine Company #2, to supplement the department while many of its members were off in Europe and Asia fighting for America's armed forces.

=== Rescue ambulance ===
Bay Shore is served by the Bay Shore-Brightwaters Volunteer Rescue Ambulance. The ambulance service covers 25 square miles and is staffed 24/7 by volunteers ranging in certifications from EMT to Paramedic.

=== Hospital ===
South Shore University Hospital (formerly Southside Hospital), which is part of Northwell Health, is located at 301 East Main Street in Bay Shore. The Hospital is an adult Level I trauma center as well as a designated Comprehensive stroke center.

== Media ==
Radio station WWWF-FM is licensed to serve Bay Shore.

== Notable people ==
- Thomas Adams, 19th century founder of the Adams Chewing Gum Company (now part of Cadbury)
- Lisa Aukland, professional bodybuilder, powerlifter, and born in Bay Shore
- Patti Austin, Grammy Award-winning American R&B, pop and jazz singer.
- Frank Boulton, Bay Shore High School alumnus, president of Atlantic League of Professional Baseball, owner and president of the Long Island Ducks
- Donna L. Crisp, U.S. Navy officer
- Aristotle Dreher, musician, co-founder of band Vaeda, born in Bay Shore and graduated from Bay Shore High School 1996
- The Entenmann family, founders of Entenmann's baked goods
- Amy Goodman, journalist, raised in Bay Shore and graduated from Bay Shore High School.
- Juanita Hall (née Long), was an American musical theatre and film actress, best known as Bloody Mary in the stage and screen versions of South Pacific, lived and died in Bay Shore
- Nancy Harrington, Florida state representative
- Henry Osborne Havemeyer, 19th century sugar baron and art collector, summered in Bay Shore through the 1900s and was an active member of the Bay Shore Yacht Club
- Edward Francis Hutton, founder of the EF Hutton brokerage company, summered in Bay Shore in the early 20th century
- Bradish Johnson, distillery, plantation, and sugar refinery owner
- Zed Key, basketball player for Ohio State Buckeyes
- Gustav Kobbé, opera expert and art critic, summered in Bay Shore, killed by hydroplane while sailing on Great South Bay
- Saul Kripke, philosopher and logician born in Bay Shore
- Nick LaLota, U.S. representative for New York
- LL Cool J, recording artist and actor, born in Bay Shore
- Richard Migliore (born 1964), retired award-winning thoroughbred jockey and current TV analyst
- Harvey Milk, former San Francisco Supervisor, gay rights pioneer, recipient of Presidential Medal of Freedom, graduated from Bay Shore High School in 1947
- Kevin Muller, international soccer player
- Joe Namath, 1970s NFL quarterback, had a summer home in Bay Shore during the early 1970s
- Mario Puzo, author of "The Godfather" lived in Bay Shore where he penned his best sellers. He would die in Bay Shore.
- Judith Regan, publisher, graduated from Bay Shore High School in 1971
- Buzz Ritchie, co-founder of Gulf Coast Community Bank, born in Bay Shore, NY
- Jeff Ruland, professional basketball player and coach
- Dawud Salahuddin (born 1950), Muslim terrorist
- Lilia Skala, actress, lived in Bay Shore during her later years
- Spurgeon Tucker, 20th century painter
- Julia Gardiner Tyler, first lady of the United States during the last nine months of the Tyler administration.
- Greg Weissert, Major League Baseball pitcher for the Boston Red Sox.

== Films with scenes filmed in Bay Shore ==
- 1969: Last Summer, directed by Frank Perry (filmed there and on Fire Island in the summer of 1968)
- 1983: The Hunger, directed by Tony Scott and starring Susan Sarandon, David Bowie, and Catherine Deneuve (exterior shots in introductory scenes)
- 1988: Married to the Mob, directed by Jonathan Demme and starring Michelle Pfeiffer and Alec Baldwin (family home and other suburban scenes)
- 2004: Birth, directed by Jonathan Glazer and starring Nicole Kidman, Lauren Bacall, Danny Huston and Anne Heche (wedding scenes at the historic Sagtikos Manor)
- 2008: What Happens in Vegas, directed by Tom Vaughan and starring Ashton Kutcher, Cameron Diaz (ferry to/from Fire Island)
- 2008: The Wackness, directed by Jonathan Levine (ferry to/from Fire Island)

== Books that take place in Bay Shore ==
- Solomon, J.D. (October 1, 2022). Home News: A Novel of 1928. Amazon Digital Services LLC - Kdp. ISBN 9798353053446. Historical fiction.
- Hausrath, Stephen Guy (2021). A Night at the Beach (1e ed.). p. 176. ISBN 9798210398444. Literary fiction.
