= Wapakoneta High School =

Location
- 1 West Redskin Trail; Wapakoneta, Ohio 45895; United States; 40°35′0″N 84°11′41″W

Information
- Type: Public
- Established: 1904
- School district: Wapakoneta City School District
- Principal: Scott J. Minnig
- Staff: 35.85 (FTE)
- Grades: 8–12
- Enrollment: 849 (2023-2024)
- Student to teacher ratio: 23.68
- Colours: Red and white
- Athletics conference: Western Buckeye League
- Team name: Redskins
- Rival: St. Marys Memorial Roughriders
- Yearbook: Retro
- Website: www.wapak.org/o/whs

Wapakoneta High School (WHS), is a public high school located in Wapakoneta, Ohio, United States. Founded in 1904, it is one of four schools that make up the Wapakoneta City School District. The high school building is located on the north side of Wapakoneta, near the downtown area. Athletic teams are known as the "Redskins", with school colors of red and white. The school's enrollment is 1,160 students in grades 8 through 12. The current building opened in 1990. The former high school was adapted as the current Wapakoneta Middle School. Prior to 1956, the district's high school, built in 1908, was known as Blume High School.

Native American tribes historically occupied this territory. Some have objected to the use of "Redskins" as a name for Wapakoneta High School sports teams, as they consider it a derogatory term.

== Schedule ==
WHS operates on a nine-mod (period) day with two semester terms. Each semester includes two nine-week grading periods. The school year is a minimum of 36 weeks, or 180 school days.

== Curriculum ==
Students may choose a general program of studies or an academic program leading to college entrance. Students also have an opportunity to attend Apollo, a modern vocational school, offering a comprehensive curriculum of career programs. The high school offers advanced placement (AP) tests, on-site College Credit Plus classes, and off-site College Credit Plus classes offered at Rhodes State College or Wright State University Lake Campus. WHS students also have the opportunity to choose study from among four languages: French, Spanish, German, and virtual school American Sign Language. In total, WHS offers 112 different classes on campus.

=== Advanced Placement classes ===
In 2015-2016, students took approximately 160 Advanced Placement tests. They earned a score of three or higher on approximately 67% of these tests. Some may have been able to earn college credit by those scores, depending on the institution.

== Staff ==
The school employs 53 teachers and various support staff. 75% of the faculty has a master's degree.

== Notable alumni ==
- Neil Armstrong (1947) — NASA astronaut, first man to walk on the Moon
- Mike Hammerstein - Professional NFL Football Player for the Cincinnati Bengals

== See also ==
- Native American mascot controversy
- Sports teams named Redskins
