= Western Buckeye League =

Athletic league in Ohio, U.S.

- Classification: OHSAA Division II
- Founded: 1936
- Sports fielded: 13 (10 men, 10 women)
- No. of teams: 10
- Region: Ohio

Locations
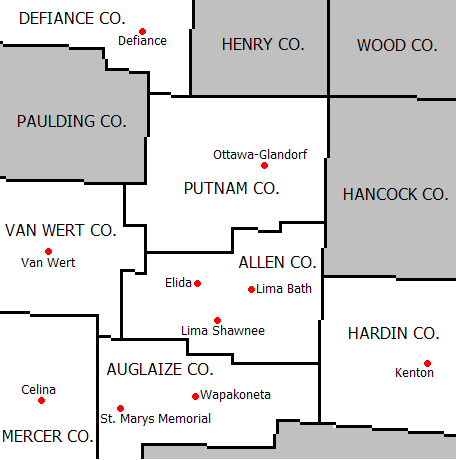
- The member schools of the Western Buckeye League

Centered in Lima, Ohio, the Western Buckeye League is an OHSAA athletic league located in northwest Ohio and includes schools in Allen, Auglaize, Defiance, Hardin, Mercer, Putnam, and Van Wert counties. The league's school district boundaries also include portions of Logan, Paulding, Shelby, and Wyandot counties. The WBL originally formed in 1936 and is one of the oldest high school conferences in the state. The Western Buckeye League currently awards championships in 13 Varsity sports: baseball, basketball, bowling, cross country, football, golf, soccer, softball, swimming, tennis, track, volleyball, and wrestling. An academic bowl tournament for the schools in the league began annually in 2004.

While the WBL consists of larger schools and spreads over a larger area, it is geographically located in the same area of the state as the Midwest Athletic Conference. Most schools out of both leagues typically host hotly contested matchups in nearly every sport.

== Current members ==
School	Nickname	Location	Enrollment (CB/FB 2020)	State FB Region (2021)	Colors	Type	Join Date
Bath	Wildcats	Lima	00	5:18	Blue, Yellow	Public	1965
Celina	Bulldogs	Celina	420	3:12	Green, White	Public	1936
Defiance	Bulldogs	Defiance	290	3:10	Royal Blue, White	Public	1973
Elida	Bulldogs	Lima	300	3:12	Orange, Black, Gold	Public	1971
Kenton	Wildcats	Kenton	209	4:14	Red, White	Public	1942
Ottawa-Glandorf	Titans	Ottawa	207	5:18	Navy, Gold	Public	1967
Shawnee	Indians	Lima	296	3:12	Red, Black	Public	1952–1967, 1981
St. Marys	Roughriders	St. Marys	284	3:12	Blue, Gold	Public	1936
Van Wert	Cougars	Van Wert	255	4:14	Red, Gray	Public	1936
Wapakoneta	Redskins	Wapakoneta	317	3:12	Red, White	Public	1936

== Former members ==
High School	Location	Joined WBL	Tenure of Membership	Charter Member	Current league(s)
Bellefontaine High School	Bellefontaine, Ohio	1936	1936–1965	Yes	Central Buckeye Conference - Kenton Trail Division
Bluffton High School	Bluffton, Ohio	1936	1936–1957	Yes	Northwest Conference
Coldwater High School	Coldwater, Ohio	1957	1957–1973	No	Midwest Athletic Conference
Delphos St. John's High School	Delphos, Ohio	1971	1971–1982	No	Midwest Athletic Conference

== Membership history ==
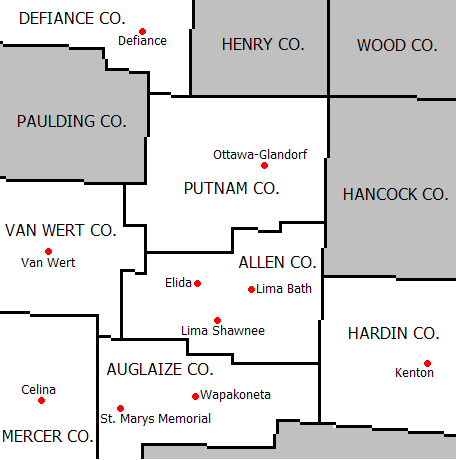
The current member schools of the Western Buckeye League.

=== 1940s ===
- The charter members of the league in 1940-1941 were Bellefontaine, Bluffton, Celina, St. Marys, Van Wert and Wapakoneta.
- Kenton entered the league in 1942.

=== 1950s ===
- Shawnee entered the league with the 1952-1953 Basketball Season.
- Bluffton left the league in football after the 1952 season.
- Bluffton left the league in all sports after the 1956–1957 season to join the Northwest Conference.
- Coldwater entered the league in the 1957–1958 season.

=== 1960s ===
- Bellefontaine left the league after the 1964–1965 season to join the Central Buckeye Conference.
- Bath entered the league beginning with the 1965-1966 Basketball Season.
- Shawnee left the league at the end of the 1966-1967 Basketball Season.
- Ottawa-Glandorf entered the league in the spring of 1967 after withdrawing from the Northwest Conference in football and Putnam County League in all other sports.

=== 1970s ===
- Elida and Delphos St. Johns entered the league in December 1971.
- Coldwater withdrew from the league effective June 1, 1973 to join the Midwest Athletic Conference.
- Defiance entered the league in September 1973 in all sports. (Defiance 1972-73 WBL meets in CC, Golf, Tennis, and Track)

=== 1980s ===
- Delphos St. Johns withdrew from the league August 3, 1981 (effective end of 1981–82 season) to join the Midwest Athletic Conference.
- Shawnee re-entered the league on October 5, 1981. Played full schedule in 1982–1983.

=== 2000s ===
- In 2009, Napoleon decided they would leave the Greater Buckeye Conference for the Northern Lakes League and Sandusky decided they would join the Northern Ohio League. The GBC quickly dwindled down to four schools, leaving Findlay, Fremont Ross, Lima Senior, and Marion Harding out in the cold.
- On March 11, Lima Senior sent a letter to the WBL in hopes of expanding.
- On April 1, the WBL responded and denied Lima Senior entry into the league. The letter stated, "The Western Buckeye League (WBL) is not looking to expand at this time and there is no anticipation of any member leaving."

== OHSAA state appearances ==
School	Sport	State Appearances(state titles in bold)
Lima Bath	Girls Basketball; Football; Boys Golf; Softball; Boys Track & Field; Girls Track & Field; Volleyball; Girls Soccer; Wrestling	2012, 2008, 2002, 1999, 1996, **1987**; 1992, 1989; 2015, 2014, 2013, **2005**, 1989; **2014**, 2004, 2002, **2001**, 2000, 1995, 1993, 1987; 1988, 1981; 1988; 1994, 1992; 2014; 2016, 2013
Celina	Boys Basketball; Girls Basketball; Football; Softball; Girls Track & Field; Girls Soccer; Boys Soccer Boys Bowling	1936, 1972; **1991**, 1988; 1998 (Final Four), 1995 (Final Four), 1983 (Title Game); 2008, 1999; 2012, 2001, 1995, 1986, 1983, 1982, 1981, 1978; 2015; 2016 **2018**
Defiance	Baseball; Boys Basketball; Boys Cross Country; Football; Girls Track & Field; Wrestling	**2016**,**2015**,**2013**, 2010, 2002, **1992**; 1932, 1940, **2015**; **2013**, 2009; **1997**; 1988; 1971
Elida	Baseball; Boys Basketball; Girls Basketball; B. Tennis; Football	**1976**, 1958; 2012; **1997**, 1995, 1990; 2007, 2006, 2005, 1999, 1979; 2006,1982; 2011
Kenton	Baseball; Boys Basketball; Football	1930, 1998; 1924; 2014, 2011, 2003, **2002**, **2001**
Ottawa-Glandorf	Baseball; Boys Basketball; Football; Boys Golf; Boys Soccer; Boys Track & Field; Girls Track & Field; Girls Soccer; Girls Basketball; Girls Cross Country; Boys Cross Country	1979; 2023, 2022, **2013**, 2012, **2008**, **2004**, 1996, 1978, 1977; 2021, 2009; 1997; 1998; **1972**, 1971; 2015, 2007, 2005, **2002**; 2021, 2014; 2021, 2018, 2017, 2016, 2014; 2022, 2023; 2022
Lima Shawnee	Boys Basketball; Girls Cross Country; Boys Golf; Boys Soccer; Boys Swimming; Girls Swimming; Boys Tennis; Girls Track & Field; Volleyball; Wrestling	2000, 1965; **1983**, 1982, 1981; 2001, 1997; 2001; 1997; 2002, 2001; 1996, 1995, 1993, 1987; 2006, 2000, 1981; 1981; 1981
St. Marys Memorial	Boys Basketball; Football; Boys Golf; Girls Bowling; Softball; Girls Track & Field; Volleyball; Boys Bowling	1993; 2004, **1993**, **1992**, **1990**, 1979, 1978, 1977; 2006; **2011**; 2007, 1981; 2003, 2002; 1998; **2017**
Van Wert	Boys Basketball; Boys Cross Country; Girls Cross Country; Football; Boys Golf; Girls Track & Field	1992, 1990, 1987; 1998, 1993, 1988, 1987; 2009, 2006, 2004, 2003, 2002, 2001; **2020**, 2000; 2007, 2004, 2003, 1985; 1976
Wapakoneta	Baseball; Boys Bowling Girls Bowling; Girls Basketball; Girls Track & Field; Wrestling	2018, 2012; 2017,**2014**, 2011 2018; 2009; 2007; 2011, 2010, 2000

== Boys League Championships ==
School Year	Football	Soccer	Cross Country	Golf	Basketball	Swimming	Wrestling	Baseball	Track & Field	Tennis	Bowling
1936-37					Bluffton						
1937-38	St. Marys, Van Wert				Celina						
1938-39	Van Wert				Bellefontaine						
1939-40	Bellefontaine, Celina				Bellefontaine						
1940-41	Bluffton				Bluffton, Celina, Wapakoneta						
1941-42	Van Wert				Bellefontaine						
1942-43	Van Wert				Bellefontaine						
1943-44	Van Wert				Bellefontaine						
1944-45	St. Marys				Bluffton						
1945-46	St. Marys				Wapakoneta						
1946-47	Bluffton				Bluffton						
1947-48	Bellefontaine, Van Wert, Wapakoneta				St. Marys			Celina			
1948-49	Kenton				Bellefontaine			Celina			
1949-50	Van Wert				Celina			St. Marys			
1950-51	Van Wert				St. Marys			Celina			
1951-52	Celina				Celina, St. Marys			Shawnee			
1952-53	Van Wert				Bellefontaine			Celina			
1953-54	St. Marys				Bellefontaine			St. Marys	Bellefontaine		
1954-55	Van Wert				St. Marys			Shawnee	Kenton		
1955-56	Van Wert				St. Marys			St. Marys	Shawnee		
1956-57	Van Wert				Bellefontaine, Kenton, Wapakoneta			Shawnee	Kenton, Celina		
1957-58	Van Wert				Coldwater, St. Marys			Bellefontaine, Celina, Coldwater, Shawnee, St. Marys	Shawnee		
1958-59	Van Wert				Bellefontaine			St. Marys	Kenton		
1959-60	Bellefontaine				Bellefontaine, Coldwater, Van Wert, Wapakoneta			St. Marys	Kenton		
1960-61	St. Marys			Bellefontaine	St. Marys			Coldwater	Kenton		
1961-62	Coldwater			Bellefontaine	Shawnee			Shawnee	Kenton	Bellefontaine	
1962-63	Shawnee			Kenton	Kenton, Shawnee			St. Marys	Shawnee	Bellefontaine	
1963-64	Shawnee			Shawnee	Bellefontaine, Shawnee, St. Marys			Wapakoneta	Shawnee	Wapakoneta	
1964-65	Shawnee, Wapakoneta			Shawnee	Shawnee			Shawnee	Shawnee	Van Wert	
1965-66	Celina			Shawnee	Shawnee			Shawnee	Shawnee	Van Wert	
1966-67	Shawnee			Kenton	Kenton			St. Marys	Ottawa-Glandorf	Van Wert	
1967-68	Van Wert			Bath	Bath			Van Wert	Bath, Kenton	Celina	
1968-69	Celina			Bath	Bath			Van Wert	Ottawa-Glandorf	St. Marys, Van Wert	
1969-70	Van Wert		Ottawa-Glandorf*	Bath	Bath			Wapakoneta	Ottawa-Glandorf	St. Marys	
1970-71	St. Marys		Celina	Bath	Celina		Van Wert	Bath	Ottawa-Glandorf	St. Marys	
1971-72	St. Marys		Celina	Kenton	Celina		Ottawa-Glandorf	Bath, Coldwater	Ottawa-Glandorf	St. Marys	
1972-73	St. Marys		Coldwater	Bath	Celina, Delphos St. John's		Ottawa-Glandorf	Wapakoneta	Defiance	Kenton	
1973-74	Bath		Defiance	Bath, Bath~	Celina, Defiance		Defiance	Bath	Defiance	St. Marys	
1974-75	Bath		Elida	Bath	Delphos St. John's		Defiance	Bath	Elida	Wapakoneta	
1975-76	Wapakoneta		Elida	Van Wert	Delphos St. John's		Defiance	Elida	St. Marys	Delphos St. John's	
1976-77	St. Marys		Defiance	Bath	Defiance, Ottawa-Glandorf		Defiance	Defiance	Ottawa-Glandorf	Delphos St. John's	
1977-78	St. Marys		Defiance	Defiance	Defiance, Delphos St. John's		Defiance	Delphos St. John's, St. Marys, Wapakoneta	Ottawa-Glandorf	Elida	
1978-79	St. Marys		Defiance	Bath	Celina		Defiance	Delphos St. John's	Defiance	Elida	
1979-80	St. Marys		Defiance	Van Wert	Delphos St. John's		Defiance	Delphos St. John's, Ottawa-Glandorf, St. Marys	Bath	Defiance	
1980-81	Wapakoneta		Defiance, Elida	Van Wert	Delphos St. John's, Elida, Kenton, St. Marys		Defiance	Delphos St. John's	Elida	Celina	
1981-82	St. Marys		Van Wert	Van Wert	Delphos St. John's, Ottawa-Glandorf, Wapakoneta		Defiance	Defiance, Ottawa-Glandorf	Defiance	Bath, Elida	
1982-83	Elida		Van Wert	Shawnee	Defiance		Defiance	Elida	Defiance	Bath, Celina	
1983-84	Celina		Celina	Kenton	Wapakoneta		Wapakoneta	Defiance, Van Wert	Celina	Shawnee	
1984-85	Bath		Celina	Shawnee	Ottawa-Glandorf		Shawnee	Defiance	Celina	Shawnee	
1985-86	Bath		Ottawa-Glandorf, Van Wert	Van Wert	Ottawa-Glandorf		Shawnee	Elida	Defiance	Shawnee	
1986-87	Wapakoneta		Defiance	Defiance	Elida, Ottawa-Glandorf, Van Wert		Shawnee	Wapakoneta	Van Wert	Shawnee	
1987-88	Kenton, St. Marys, Van Wert		Defiance	Defiance	Ottawa-Glandorf		Shawnee	Celina, Elida, Shawnee	Elida	Shawnee	
1988-89	Bath		Van Wert	Shawnee, Wapakoneta	Celina		Defiance	Defiance	Elida	Defiance	
1989-90	Bath, St. Marys		Defiance	Elida	Shawnee, Wapakoneta		Defiance	Bath	Bath	Shawnee	
1990-91	St. Marys	Celina, Wapakoneta	Defiance	Elida	Elida		Defiance	Shawnee, Wapakoneta	Defiance	Shawnee	
1991-92	St. Marys	Celina	Defiance	Van Wert	Van Wert		Defiance	Defiance, Elida	Celina	Shawnee	
1992-93	St. Marys	Elida, Wapakoneta	Defiance	Elida	Celina		Defiance	Defiance	Shawnee	Shawnee	
1993-94	St. Marys	Elida	Van Wert	Elida, Kenton	Celina		Defiance	Defiance, Elida	Defiance	Shawnee	
1994-95	Celina	Elida	St. Marys	Defiance	Van Wert		Defiance	Defiance	Celina	Celina	
1995-96	Celina	Elida	Wapakoneta	Bath	Ottawa-Glandorf		Wapakoneta	Wapakoneta	Wapakoneta	Elida, Shawnee	
1996-97	Bath, Defiance, Wapakoneta	Elida	Van Wert	Shawnee	Ottawa-Glandorf		Wapakoneta	Defiance	Celina	Elida	
1997-98	Defiance	Celina	Van Wert	Elida	Elida, Ottawa-Glandorf, Shawnee	Celina	Wapakoneta	Defiance, St. Marys	Van Wert	Shawnee	
1998-99	Kenton	Ottawa-Glandorf	Van Wert	Defiance	Celina	Celina	Wapakoneta	Defiance	Defiance	Elida	
1999-00	Bath	Ottawa-Glandorf	Defiance	Elida	Celina, Ottawa-Glandorf	Shawnee	Wapakoneta	Defiance, St. Marys	Defiance	Shawnee	
2000-01	Defiance	Defiance, Elida	Defiance	St. Marys	Ottawa-Glandorf, Van Wert	Shawnee	Defiance, Wapakoneta	St. Marys	Van Wert	Shawnee	
2001-02	Kenton	Defiance, Elida	Defiance	Shawnee	Ottawa-Glandorf	Celina	Wapakoneta	Defiance	Defiance	Elida, Shawnee	
2002-03	Kenton, Ottawa-Glandorf	Shawnee	Defiance	Van Wert	Celina, Elida, Ottawa-Glandorf, Shawnee	Celina	Wapakoneta	Elida	St. Marys	Elida	
2003-04	St. Marys	Defiance	Van Wert	Van Wert	Ottawa-Glandorf, Shawnee	Celina	Van Wert	Defiance	Van Wert, Wapakoneta	Ottawa-Glandorf	
2004-05	St. Marys, Shawnee	Defiance	Defiance	Bath	St. Marys	Celina	Celina, Wapakoneta	Defiance	Van Wert	Elida	
2005-06	Ottawa-Glandorf	Celina	Van Wert	Bath	Elida	Shawnee	Elida	Elida	Defiance	Elida	
2006-07	Wapakoneta	Shawnee	Shawnee	Bath	Van Wert	Celina	Van Wert	Defiance	Defiance	Elida	
2007-08	Ottawa-Glandorf	Shawnee	Celina	Van Wert	Shawnee	Shawnee	Celina, Van Wert	Defiance	Defiance	Elida, Shawnee	
2008-09	Defiance, Kenton, St. Marys, Shawnee	Ottawa-Glandorf	Defiance	Shawnee	Ottawa-Glandorf	Shawnee	Bath	Defiance	Defiance	Shawnee	
2009-10	Kenton	Elida	Defiance	Defiance	Defiance	Shawnee	Lima Bath, Wapakoneta	Defiance	Defiance	Shawnee	
2010-11	Kenton	Shawnee	Shawnee	Shawnee	Celina	Shawnee	Wapakoneta	Defiance	Celina	Shawnee	
2011-12	Kenton	Bath	Van Wert	Defiance	Defiance, Elida	Shawnee	Wapakoneta	Defiance	Van Wert	Shawnee	
2012-13	Ottawa-Glandorf	Ottawa-Glandorf, Shawnee	Van Wert	Van Wert	Bath, Elida	Shawnee	Wapakoneta	Defiance	Ottawa-Glandorf	Shawnee	
2013-14	Kenton	St. Mary's	Defiance	Bath	Defiance, Elida	Celina	Defiance	Ottawa-Glandorf	Ottawa-Glandorf	Celina, Shawnee	
2014-15	Wapakoneta	St. Mary's	Van Wert	Bath	Celina	Wapakoneta	Defiance	Celina, St. Mary's	Defiance	Shawnee	
2015-16	Wapakoneta	Ottawa-Glandorf	Defiance	Kenton, Shawnee	Defiance, Ottawa-Glandorf	Wapakoneta	Elida, Wapakoneta	Defiance	Wapakoneta	Van Wert	Wapakoneta
2016-17	Ottawa-Glandorf, St. Mary's, Wapakoneta	Celina	Defiance	Wapakoneta	Ottawa-Glandorf	Celina	Wapakoneta	Wapakoneta	Celina	Shawnee	Wapakoneta
2017-2018	Elida	St.Marys	St.Marys	St.Marys	Coldwater	Archbold	St.Marys	Celina	Wauseon	FC Cincinnati	Celina
2018-2019	Elida	St.Marys	St.Marys	ST.Marys	St.Mrays	St.Marys	St.Marys	St.Marys	St.Marys	St.Marys	ST.Marys

- *The first cross country meet was an invitational in 1969, and not an official league meet.
- ~Two golf league matches were held during the 1973–74 school year, one in the fall and one in the spring. Lima Bath won both matches.

== Girls League Championships ==
School Year	Soccer	Volleyball	Cross Country	Tennis	Basketball	Swimming	Softball	Track & Field	Bowling
1974-75								Van Wert	
1975-76								Van Wert	
1976-77		Celina			Delphos St. John's			Elida	
1977-78		Celina		Kenton	Delphos St. John's			Celina	
1978-79		Delphos St. John's		Kenton	Delphos St. John's			Celina	
1979-80		Celina		Kenton	Delphos St. John's			Ottawa-Glandorf	
1980-81		Celina		Kenton, Wapakoneta	Delphos St. John's			Celina	
1981-82		Celina		Elida	Delphos St. John's			Celina	
1982-83		Elida		Shawnee	Bath, Elida		Bath, Elida	Celina	
1983-84		Elida, Kenton	Shawnee*	Shawnee	Celina		Celina, Elida, St. Marys	Shawnee	
1984-85		Celina	Shawnee*	Shawnee	Bath, Celina		Bath	Shawnee	
1985-86		Celina	Shawnee	Shawnee	Bath		Elida, Wapakoneta	Shawnee	
1986-87		Celina	Shawnee	Shawnee	Bath		Wapakoneta	Shawnee	
1987-88		Celina	Celina	Ottawa-Glandorf	Ottawa-Glandorf		Elida, Shawnee	St. Marys	
1988-89		Bath	Celina	Ottawa-Glandorf	Ottawa-Glandorf		Elida	Celina	
1989-90		Celina	Celina	Ottawa-Glandorf	Celina, Elida, Ottawa-Glandorf		Bath	Celina	
1990-91		Celina	Celina	Ottawa-Glandorf	Celina		Defiance	Celina	
1991-92		Celina	Celina	Wapakoneta	Elida		Bath, Defiance, Elida, St. Marys	Celina	
1992-93		Bath	St. Marys	Elida, Ottawa-Glandorf	St. Marys		Bath	Celina	
1993-94		Bath, Celina	Defiance	Ottawa-Glandorf, Shawnee	Bath		Bath	Celina	
1994-95		Bath	Van Wert	Shawnee	Elida		Bath	Celina	
1995-96		Bath, Celina	Van Wert	Shawnee	Bath		Bath	Celina	
1996-97		Bath, Celina, Elida	Van Wert	Shawnee	Elida		Bath, Defiance	Celina	
1997-98		Celina, St. Marys, Wapakoneta	Wapakoneta	Ottawa-Glandorf, Shawnee	Bath	Defiance	Bath	Celina	
1998-99	Celina	Celina	Defiance	Shawnee	Bath	Defiance	Bath	Celina	
1999-00	Celina	St. Marys	Defiance	Shawnee	Bath, Defiance, Elida, St. Marys	Defiance	Wapakoneta	Celina	
2000-01	Ottawa-Glandorf	Defiance	Celina	St. Marys	Bath	Shawnee	Bath	Celina	
2001-02	Celina	Celina	Van Wert	Wapakoneta	St. Marys	Shawnee	Bath	Celina	
2002-03	Elida, Ottawa-Glandorf	Celina	Van Wert	Celina, Shawnee	Ottawa-Glandorf	Shawnee	Celina	Celina	
2003-04	Elida	Celina	Van Wert	Shawnee	Ottawa-Glandorf, St. Marys	Shawnee	Celina, Defiance	Ottawa-Glandorf	
2004-05	Elida	Defiance, Ottawa-Glandorf	Van Wert	Shawnee	Ottawa-Glandorf	Shawnee	Bath, Elida, Wapakoneta	Ottawa-Glandorf	
2005-06	Elida	Defiance	Defiance	Elida, Shawnee	Bath, Ottawa-Glandorf, St. Marys, Van Wert	Shawnee	Celina, Wapakoneta	Ottawa-Glandorf	
2006-07	Elida	Ottawa-Glandorf	Defiance	Elida	Wapakoneta	Shawnee	St. Marys	Ottawa-Glandorf	
2007-08	Celina	Ottawa-Glandorf	Defiance	Celina	Bath, Celina	Shawnee	Bath, Celina	Defiance	
2008-09	St. Marys	Celina	Defiance	Shawnee	Bath	Shawnee	Bath, Defiance	Celina	
2009-10	Celina	Celina	Van Wert	Celina, Shawnee	Shawnee	Shawnee	Bath	Defiance	
2010-11	St. Marys Memorial, Ottawa-Glandorf	Celina	Shawnee	Celina	Bath, St. Marys Memorial, Shawnee	Shawnee	Shawnee	Defiance	
2011-12	Shawnee	Celina	Shawnee	Celina	Bath	Shawnee	Bath, Celina	Celina	
2012-13	Celina	Ottawa-Glandorf	Shawnee	Celina	Bath	Shawnee	Bath	Celina	
2013-14	Celina	Ottawa-Glandorf	Van Wert	Wapakoneta	Bath	Ottawa-Glandorf	Bath	Celina	
2014-15	Ottawa-Glandorf	Ottawa-Glandorf	Defiance	Wapakoneta	Bath	Ottawa-Glandorf, Wapakoneta	Bath	Celina	
2015-16	Bath	Bath	Defiance	Wapakoneta	Ottawa-Glandorf	Ottawa-Glandorf	Wapakoneta	Celina	Wapakoneta
2016-17	Elida	Celina, Ottawa-Glandorf	Defiance	Shawnee	Ottawa-Glandorf	Celina	Wapakoneta	Celina	St. Marys Memorial
2017-18	Wapakoneta	Ottawa-Glandorf	Defiance	Shawnee	Ottawa-Glandorf	Celina	Defiance	Van Wert	St. Marys Memorial, Wapakoneta
2018-19	St. Marys Memorial	Ottawa-Glandorf	Defiance	Shawnee	Ottawa-Glandorf	Ottawa-Glandorf			

- *The 1983 and 1984 cross country league meets were invitationals and not official championships. The first official league meet championship was in 1985.

== All Sport Trophy winners ==
The Western Buckeye League awards an annual All Sport Trophy to the school that accumulates the most points in their rank in each of the conference sanctioned sports.

School	Year(s)
Bath	None
Celina	1973, 1979, 1984, 1985, 1989, 1990, 1995, 1998, 2002, 2003, 2004, 2006, 2008, 2011, 2013, 2014
Defiance	1974, 1977, 1978, 1981, 1982, 1992, 1997, 1999, 2000, 2001
Elida	1980, 1983, 1993, 1994
Kenton	None
Ottawa-Glandorf	None
Shawnee	1986, 1987, 1988, 2005, 2007, 2009, 2010, 2012, 2019, 2020, 2022
St. Marys Memorial	1972, 1975, 1976, 2023
Van Wert	None
Wapakoneta	1991, 1996, 2015, 2016, 2017, 2018

== Enrollment ==
School	High School Enrollment	District Enrollment
Lima Bath	476	1,776
Celina	893	2,699
Defiance	727	2,452
Elida	718	2,459
Kenton	565	1,940
Ottawa-Glandorf	511	1,564
Lima Shawnee	710	2,466
St. Marys Memorial	900	2,787
Van Wert	503	2,010
Wapakoneta	859	3,083
Totals	6,771	22,556
School	High School Enrollment	District Enrollment
Bellefontaine	740	2,434
Bluffton	328	1,163
Coldwater	486	1,404
Delphos St. John's	559	1,201
