= Kevin Muller (footballer) =

Puerto Rican footballer (born 1987)

Personal information
- Date of birth: April 22, 1987 (age 39)
- Place of birth: Bay Shore, New York, United States
- Height: 5 ft 10 in (1.78 m)
- Position: Defender

Youth career
- 2005: C.W. Post
- 2006–2007: Stony Brook University

International career^{‡}
Years	Team	Apps	(Gls)
2008	Puerto Rico	3	(0)
- ‡ National team caps and goals as of 12:29, 7 September 2009 (UTC)

Kevin Muller (born April 22, 1987) is a Puerto Rican international soccer player who played college soccer for Stony Brook University as a defender.
