= Ryan Downard =

American football player and coach (born 1988)

Miami Dolphins
- Title: Secondary coach

Personal information
- Born: June 22, 1988 (age 38); Lima, Ohio, U.S.
- Listed height: 6 ft 0 in (1.83 m)
- Listed weight: 202 lb (92 kg)

Career information
- High school: Shawnee (Lima)
- College: Eastern Michigan (2007–2010)

Career history
- Shawnee (HS) (2012) Defensive backs coach; Texas Tech (2013) Graduate assistant; Cleveland Browns (2014–2015) Coaching assistant; Bowling Green (2016-2017); Chief of staff (2016); Safeties coach (2017); Green Bay Packers (2018-2025); Defensive quality control coach (2018); Assistant defensive backs coach (2019-2021); Safeties coach (2022); Defensive backs coach (2023-2025); Miami Dolphins (2026–present) Secondary coach

Ryan Mitchell Downard (born June 22, 1988) is an American football coach and former player who is the secondary coach for the Miami Dolphins of the National Football League (NFL). Downard was previously the defensive backs coach for the Green Bay Packers.

== College career ==
After graduating from Shawnee High School, where he was nominated to the first-team All-Ohio team for multiple years, Downard chose to attend Eastern Michigan University. In Downard's redshirt freshman year, he recorded six interceptions for Eastern Michigan, tied for 12th nationally. For his performance in his redshirt freshman year, Downard was named as an honorable mention for the All-American team. Following Downard's freshman year, he remained a consistent starter, but injuries shortened his college career until he graduated in 2010.

Against the University of Michigan in 2007, Downard intercepted a pass and also returned a blocked PAT for a touchdown. The defensive touchdown was the first ever defensive score against Michigan in EMU's 128 year history.

Pre-draft measurables
Height	Weight	40-yard dash	10-yard split	20-yard split	20-yard shuttle	Three-cone drill	Vertical jump	Broad jump	Bench press
6 ft 0 1/4 in (1.84 m)	202 lb (92 kg)	4.70 s	1.56 s	2.73 s	4.24 s	6.76 s	31.5 in (0.80 m)	9 ft 3 in (2.82 m)	17 reps
All values from Pro Day

== Coaching career ==
Following his college football career, Downard became a graduate assistant for Toledo and Texas Tech for five months and a year respectively.

Following his stints as a graduate assistant coach, Downard became an assistant coach for the Cleveland Browns from 2014-15.

After his time with the Cleveland Browns, Downard joined the Bowling Green Falcons in 2016 and became the director of football operations in 2017.

In 2018, Downard joined the Packers as a defensive quality control coach, but later became the assistant defensive backs coach and was appointed safeties coach again in 2022. On March 10, 2023, Downard was promoted to defensive backs coach.

He followed Jeff Hafley to Miami and was hired as the team's new secondary coach in 2026.
