= Kenton High School (Kenton, Ohio) =

Kenton Middle/High School
- Official school logo

Location
- 751 Wildcat Way; Kenton, Ohio 43326; United States; 40°39′42.8″N 83°35′38.7″W

Information
- Type: Public
- Motto: Only The Educated Are Free
- School board: Kenton City Schools Board of Education
- School district: Kenton City Schools
- Superintendent: Chad Thrush
- CEEB code: 362790
- Principal: Jason Jones, High School; Kirk Cameron, Middle School
- Teaching staff: 36.00 (FTE)
- Grades: 6-12
- Student to teacher ratio: 15.19
- Colors: Red and White
- Fight song: Rah Rah For Kenton and Red and White
- Athletics: Fall: Football, Boys and Girls Soccer, Volleyball, Girls Tennis, and Golf; Winter: Wrestling, Boys and Girls Basketball, Swimming/Diving, and Powerlifting; Spring: Track and Field, Baseball, Softball, and Boys Tennis.
- Athletics conference: Western Buckeye League
- Mascot: Wildcat
- Nickname: Wildcats
- Yearbook: The Echo
- Website: www.kentoncityschools.org/schools/kenton-middle-high-school/

Kenton Middle/High School is a public middle and high school in Kenton, Ohio. It is the only middle/high school in the Kenton City Schools district. Their mascot are the Wildcats. They are members of the Western Buckeye League. The school offers coursework in all standard subjects like Math, Science, Social Studies and English, but also features a unique blend of elective courses including Conservation Science, Agricultural Education, Health Science & Technology, Information Technology, Business, Manufacturing, fine arts, broadcasting & journalism, and many more. In the fall of 2025 a new building was opened that houses 6-12th grades.

== Football championships ==
The Kenton High School football team won the state championship in 2001 and 2002,

== Notable alumni ==
- Ben Mauk, former American football quarterback
- Maty Mauk, former American football quarterback
