= Robin Freeman =

Robin Freeman may refer to:

- Robin Freeman (basketball) (1934–2014), two-time All-American guard at Ohio State University in the 1950s
- Robin Freeman (golfer) (born 1959), American professional golfer
