= Jay Burson =

American basketball player

Personal information
- Born: June 22, 1966 (age 60) Zanesville, Ohio, U.S.
- Listed height: 6 ft 0 in (1.83 m)
- Listed weight: 160 lb (73 kg)

Career information
- High school: John Glenn (New Concord, Ohio)
- College: Ohio State (1985–1989)
- NBA draft: 1989: undrafted
- Position: Point guard
- Coaching career: 2000–present

Career history
- 1989–1990: Columbus Horizon
- 1990–1991: San Jose Jammers

Career highlights
- First-team All-Big Ten (1989); Second-team All-Big Ten (1988)

Jay Burson (born June 22, 1966) is an American former college basketball player for the Ohio State Buckeyes and former player in the Continental Basketball Association (CBA).

== Basketball career ==
=== High school ===
Burson attended John Glenn High School in New Concord, Ohio from 1981-85. During his sophomore season, he led the nation in scoring with a 44 points per game average. In his four seasons at John Glenn, he scored 2,958 points earning him the record for most points scored in the history of Ohio high school basketball. He held that record for 22 years until it was beaten by Upper Sandusky senior Jon Diebler (3,208 points) in February 2007.

=== College ===
From 1986-89, Burson played for Ohio State University in the Big Ten Conference. He averaged 22.1 points a game for Gary Williams' Buckeyes in the 1988-89 season. During a late season contest against Iowa in his senior year, Burson's college career came to an end when he collided with Ed Horton. He was fitted with a traction brace that he had to wear for three months.

=== NBA ===
After his injury, Burson made an attempted comeback. In August 1989, Burson signed a three-year contract with the Houston Rockets of the NBA. He was one of six players the Rockets invited back from a rookie tryout camp in July and he reported for pre-season workouts that October. After playing just four preseason games, however, it appeared that his playing days had ended.

=== CBA ===
In 1989, prior to signing with the Rockets, Burson had been selected as the first round draft pick - seventh overall - of the Columbus Horizon, a new Continental Basketball Association franchise. When it did not work out in the NBA, Burson joined the Horizon for their first season. Initially, Burson said he would not play in Columbus.

"I'm going to make (Houston's) roster, but if I don't, I'll probably go back to school," he said.

However, after being released by Houston and clearing waivers in October 1989, he decided to sign with the Horizon. "The Horizon is very pleased to have signed our No 1 pick," said owner Eli Jacobson. "Jay Burson was in the process of making future plans, and we're just glad the Horizon are part of his plans."

Burson wasn't signed just to sell tickets, Horizon coach Gary Youmans said. "We want Jay as a player, not as a drawing card. He might attract some fans but we want him so we can win ballgames."

He made his home debut in December 1989, scoring 15 points in a 132-123 loss to Pensacola in front of 3,272 fans. In 34 games with the Horizon in the 1989-90 season, Burson averaged 13.6 points a game. In September 1990, Burson was traded to the San Jose Jammers for a second-round pick in the 1991 CBA draft and a player to be named later.
