= Memorial High School (St. Marys, Ohio) =

- Memorial High School logo

Location
- 2250 State Route 66; St. Marys, (Auglaize County), Ohio 45885; United States
- Coordinates: 40°33′30″N 84°22′26″W

Information
- Type: Public, Coeducational high school
- Established: 1912
- Superintendent: Bill Ruane
- Principal: Jason Johnson
- Teaching staff: 35.85 (FTE)
- Grades: 6-12
- Enrollment: 849 (2023-2024)
- Student to teacher ratio: 23.68
- Colors: Royal Blue and Gold
- Athletics conference: Western Buckeye League
- Mascot: Rocky
- Team name: Roughriders
- Website: https://www.smriders.net/page/memorial-high-school

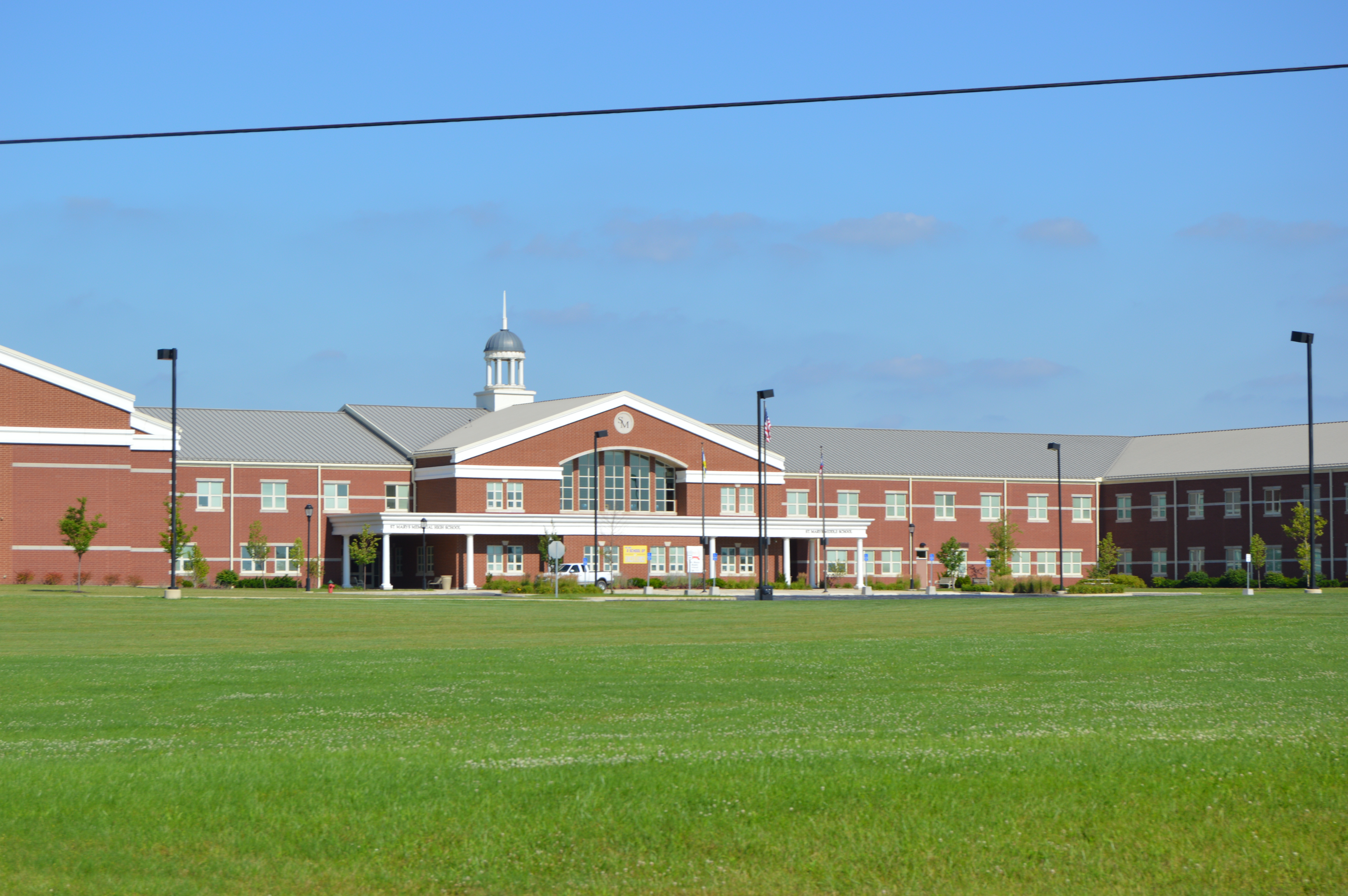
St. Marys Memorial High School as seen from State Route 66

Memorial High School is a public high school in St. Marys, Ohio. It is the only high school in the St. Marys City School District. Memorial High School was designated "Excellent" (the highest designation given) by the Ohio Department of Education in the 2007-2008 ODE report card. The nickname of their athletic teams is the Roughriders. They are a member of the Western Buckeye League. Although the official name of the high school is Memorial, local media generally refers to the school's athletic teams as the St. Marys Roughriders. The school's colors are royal blue and gold.

The original school building, built in 1923, was located near Skip Baughman Stadium. However, on November 7, 2007, St. Marys City School voters passed a bond issue for the construction of a new high school. The building, built for the 2010-2011 school year, is a 6th-grade through 12th-grade complex located near U.S. 33 and State Route 66. The original school building was torn down shortly after its completion.

== Athletics ==
=== Sports offered ===
Fall Sports

- Boys Football
- Boys Cross Country
- Girls Cross Country
- Boys Soccer
- Girls Soccer
- Girls Tennis
- Girls Volleyball

Winter Sports

- Boys Basketball
- Girls Basketball
- Boys Bowling
- Girls Bowling
- Boys Swimming
- Girls Swimming
- Boys Wrestling

Spring Sports

- Boys Baseball
- Girls Softball
- Boys Tennis
- Boys Track and Field
- Girls Track and Field

=== Ohio High School Athletic Association Team State Championships ===
- Boys Football – 1990, 1992, 1993
- Boys Bowling - 2017, 2019
- Girls Bowling - 2011, 2019

=== OHSAA Team State Runner-Up ===
- Boys Football - 2004
- Girls Softball - 2007

=== OHSAA Team State Final Four ===
- Boys Football - 1977, 1978, 2019
- Girls Soccer - 2009
- Girls Softball - 1981, 2007
- Boys Basketball - 1993
- Girls Volleyball - 1998

== Notable alumni ==
- Galen Cisco (Class of 1954) - Former Major League Baseball pitcher (New York Mets, Boston Red Sox, Kansas City Royals) and coach. Pitching coach for World Series Champion Toronto Blue Jays in 1992-93. Galen Cisco was also co-captain and fullback for Ohio State's 1957 national collegiate football champs.
- Floyd A. Keith (Class of 1965) - Executive Director, Black Coaches & Administrators from 2001 until present. Coached collegiate football for 30 years. Coach Keith was an assistant football coach at Miami University (1970-1973), University of Colorado (1974-1978), University of Arizona (1983), and Indiana University (1984-1992). He was the head football coach at Howard University (1979-1982) and the University of Rhode Island (1993-1999).
- Mel Land (Class of 1975) – Former NFL linebacker (Miami Dolphins, San Francisco 49ers).
