= Shawnee High School (Lima, Ohio) =

Location
- 3333 Zurmehly Road; Lima, (Allen County), Ohio 45806; United States
- Coordinates: 40°41′34″N 84°10′3″W

Information
- School district: Shawnee Local Schools
- Superintendent: Don Diglia
- Principal: James Morris
- Teaching staff: 37.00 (FTE)
- Grades: 9–12
- Student to teacher ratio: 18.68
- Colors: Red and Black
- Fight song: The Fight Song (On Wisconsin!)
- Athletics conference: Western Buckeye League
- Sports: Football (American), Baseball, Basketball, Cross Country, Soccer, Softball, Swimming, Track & Field, Tennis, Volleyball, Wrestling, Bowling, Cheerleading, Marching Band
- Mascot: Shawnee Indian
- Team name: Indians
- Newspaper: The Chief
- Yearbook: The Quilna
- Feeder schools: Shawnee Middle School
- Website: District Website

Shawnee High School is a public high school located just southwest of Lima, Ohio. It is part of the Shawnee Local School District.

== Extracurricular activities ==
They are members of the Western Buckeye League.

=== Ohio High School Athletic Association State Championships ===
- Girls Cross Country – 1983
- Boys Soccer - 2022

== Notable alumni ==
- Steve Arlin, Ohio State University Baseball pitcher. In 1966 Arlin led Ohio State to the National Championship and was named the tournament’s Most Valuable Player. Former MLB Pitcher for San Diego Padres 1969 - 1974, and Cleveland Indians 1974.
- Jim Baldridge, former news anchor for WHIO-TV
- Jamar Butler, Ohio's Mr. Basketball of 2004, Former Ohio State men's basketball point guard
- Randy Crites, U.S. Navy vice admiral
- Ryan Downard, American football coach
- Hugh Downs, broadcaster, television host, producer, and author
- Brad Komminsk, Baseball Player
