= Jamar Butler =

American basketball player (born 1985)

Personal information
- Born: September 27, 1985 (age 40) Lima, Ohio, U.S.
- Listed height: 6 ft 1 in (1.85 m)
- Listed weight: 185 lb (84 kg)

Career information
- High school: Shawnee (Lima, Ohio)
- College: Ohio State (2004–2008)
- NBA draft: 2008: undrafted
- Playing career: 2008–2012
- Position: Point guard

Career history
- 2008: Juvecaserta Basket
- 2009: Mutlu Akü Selçuk Üniversitesi
- 2009–2010: Olympia Larissa
- 2010: KK Igokea
- 2010–2011: Eisbären Bremerhaven
- 2011–2012: Lima Explosion
- 2012: Piratas de Quebradillas
- 2012: AEK Larnaca

Career highlights
- First-team All-Big Ten (2008); Ohio Mr. Basketball (2004)

Jamar Butler (born September 27, 1985) is a basketball point guard. His career started at Shawnee High School in Lima, Ohio, where he was named Ohio's Mr. Basketball his senior year. Butler was then recruited by both the University of Cincinnati and Ohio State University. Jamar chose Ohio State, where he broke multiple school records while majoring in African American and African Studies.

== Early career ==
Butler attended Shawnee High School in Lima, Ohio, and scored a total of 2,412 points throughout his high school career. He placed tenth on Ohio's all-time scoring list. In his senior year, Butler averaged 31.6 points a game, 8.3 assists, 5.8 rebounds, and 2.6 steals a game, and he was named Ohio's Mr. Basketball of 2004. Butler was honored for his Mr. Basketball honor on January 14, 2011 at a varsity game vs. Elida High School. Jamar was Lima's 4th Mr. Basketball in Ohio winner, the others, Greg Simpson (twice) and Aaron Hutchins.

As a sophomore, Butler averaged 10.1 points per game and was named Big Ten Player of the Week in February 2006 after leading Ohio State to wins against two ranked opponents. He also led the team in foul shots, with an accuracy rate of about eighty percent. As a junior, Butler scored 18 points in the first game of the season and did so again against Penn State. He played for thirty minutes or more in twenty-eight of Ohio State's thirty-nine games.

As a senior, Butler helped lead Ohio State to victory in the 2008 National Invitation Tournament

Butler set the career records in assists (579) and games played (139) at Ohio State. (His assists record has since been eclipsed by Aaron Craft.) He is also twenty-third all-time in scoring, with 1,313 points.
