= Thomas Anderson =

Thomas Anderson may refer to:

== Arts and entertainment ==
- Thomas Anderson (actor) (1905–1996), American actor
- T. J. Anderson (Thomas Jefferson Anderson, born 1928), African American composer, conductor, orchestrator and educator
- Thomas Anderson (musician), American musician
- Neo (The Matrix), (Thomas A. Anderson), central character from The Matrix
- Mr. Anderson (Beavis and Butt-head) (Thomas T. Anderson), character from the animated television series Beavis and Butt-Head

== Law and politics ==
- Thomas L. Anderson (1808–1885), American lawyer and politician in the U.S. House of Representatives from Missouri
- Thomas Wesley Anderson (1828–1916), American politician from Wisconsin
- Thomas H. Anderson (judge) (1848–1916), United States federal judge
- Thomas C. Anderson (1858–1931), American political boss and state legislator in New Orleans, Louisiana
- Thomas Arnold Anderson (1871–1939), Canadian politician in Saskatchewan, Canada
- Thomas J. Anderson (author) (1910–2002), American politician, presidential candidate, author and publisher
- Thomas J. Anderson (judge) (1837–1910), justice of the Territorial Utah Supreme Court
- Thomas Anderson (New Mexico politician) (1933–2024), American politician, member of the New Mexico House of Representatives
- Thomas H. Anderson Jr. (born 1946), American diplomat
- S. Thomas Anderson (born 1953), American judge in Tennessee

== Military ==
- Thomas Oakley Anderson (1783–1844), American naval officer during the Barbary Wars, 1803–1805
- Thomas M. Anderson (1836–1917), American army general
- Thomas Anderson (Medal of Honor) (1841–1912), American soldier, Civil War Medal of Honor recipient
- Thomas Victor Anderson (1881–1972), Canadian major-general and former Chief of the General Staff

== Science and medicine ==
- Thomas Anderson (chemist) (1819–1874), Scottish organic chemist
- Thomas Anderson (botanist) (1832–1870), Scottish botanist
- Thomas McCall Anderson (1836–1908), Scottish physician and professor of practice of medicine
- Thomas David Anderson (1853–1932), Scottish astronomer
- Thomas F. Anderson (1911–1991), American biophysical chemist and geneticist
- Thomas E. Anderson (born 1961), American computer scientist

== Sports ==
=== Association football (soccer) ===
- Thomas Anderson (footballer, born 1897) (1897–?), Scottish professional footballer
- Thomas Anderson (footballer, born 1916), English professional footballer
- Tommy Anderson (footballer) (1934–2018), Scottish professional footballer
- Thomas Anderson (English footballer), English professional footballer

=== Other sports ===
- Thomas Anderson (rugby) (1863–1938), Scottish rugby player
- Thomas Anderson (sailor) (1939–2010), Australian sailor and Olympic champion
- Tam Anderson (Thomas Anderson), Scottish wrestler
- Thomas Anderson (tennis), British tennis player in 1938 Wimbledon Championships – Men's Singles

== Others ==
- Thomas Brown Anderson (1796–1873), Canadian merchant, banker, and member of the Special Council of Lower Canada
- Thomas Anderson (trade unionist) (1888–1964), New Zealand seaman and trade unionist
- Thomas Anderson (landowner) (1740–?), landowner in Perth, Scotland
- Thomas Gummersall Anderson (1779–1875), fur trader, soldier, and employee in the British Indian Department

== See also ==
- Thomas Andersson (born 1956), Swedish footballer
- Thomas Andersson (footballer, born 1968), Swedish footballer
- Tom Anderson (disambiguation)
- Tommy Anderson (disambiguation)
- Thomas Andersen (disambiguation)
