= T. Anderson =

T. Anderson may refer to:

- Terry Anderson (disambiguation)
- Theodore Wilbur Anderson (1918–2016), American mathematician
- Thomas Anderson (disambiguation)
- Tim Anderson (disambiguation)
- Tina Anderson, American comic writer
- Todd Anderson, rugby league footballer

== See also ==
- Theresa Andersson (born 1972), singer-songwriter
