= Twinsburg Center (Old School) =

School and education centre in Ohio, U.S.

Coordinates: 41°18′40.68″N 81°26′18.87″W

The Old School
- Twinsburg Centralised School

Location
- Twinsburg, Summit County, Ohio 44087; United States

Information
- Type: Public, Centralised School
- Established: c. Fall 1921
- Status: Demolished (as of 2016)
- Closed: c. 1992
- School district: Twinsburg City School District
- Principal: (Historical figure)
- Grades: K–12 (for over 30 years)
- Enrollment: (Varies)
- Student to teacher ratio: 18:1
- Colors: Orange and Black
- Mascot: Tiger (Shared by the district)

The Twinsburg Old School, also known as the "Old School" or the Twinsburg Center, was built in 1921 for the Twinsburg City School District in Twinsburg, Ohio for the grades K-12, It was built 26 years after the Twinsburg Institute by Samuel Bissell in 1865. The school was a public, centralised School, open to citizens of Summit County and the citizens of Twinsburg. It was later demolished in April 2016 due to vacancy.

== History ==
In 1921, The Twinsburg Community created this school, Due to the lack of education in Twinsburg, They wanted a public and free school, The Old School was used for Campaigning, Schooling, Education, and also, soon an UAW training center for Daimler Chrysler, a campus for Kent State University, and a rehearsal space for the Twinsburg Community Theatre, continuing its service to the community long after its primary role as a K-12 school ended in the mid-1950s when the town experienced a population boom requiring newer, separate facilities for younger students. The brick building successfully transitioned into the dedicated Twinsburg High School for the burgeoning student body before a much larger, modern high school was built in 1999. It was after this second transition that the building became known as the Twinsburg Center, fully embracing its new identity as an adult education and community facility, hosting Kent State courses and the UAW training operations that connected local industry with necessary skills training. The Twinsburg Community Theatre, seeking an affordable venue, utilized the former school's space, ensuring the arts remained central to the location. The building continued to serve these multifaceted roles well into the 21st century until Kent State University constructed its modern, purpose-built academic center in 2012, at which point the old building's primary occupants vacated, leaving its future uncertain. Despite its vacancy and the debates over the high costs of renovation versus preservation, the building remains a powerful physical reminder of Twinsburg's educational past, having anchored the community's learning, politics, and culture for nearly a hundred years.

== Current status ==
The Old School was shut down for students of the Twinsburg City School District in 1992, and was vacated by Kent State in 2012, due to its vacancy, The Twinsburg Community decided to demolish it, After demolished, an 88-year-old women decided to sue Twinsburg due the demolition of the Old School. After the demolition, the lot remained vacant as of November 2025.

== Legacy ==
The history of the central Twinsburg school building, from its 1921 origins as the community's first free and centralized educational institution, establishes it as a powerful physical testament to Twinsburg's growth and adaptability. It holds a unique place in the town's memory, having directly influenced generations of residents. The community created the facility in 1921 to finally provide a public and free education for all its children, serving as the sole K-12 school for decades.

This building's service didn't end when the school district moved out. Recognizing its value as a large, centrally located facility, it was later repurposed to serve the adult educational and industrial needs of the region. For years, the building hosted courses for Kent State University and served as an UAW training center for Daimler Chrysler, directly supporting the local automotive workforce. The local Twinsburg Community Theatre also utilized the space, ensuring the arts remained a fixture in the center of town.

Following Kent State's relocation to its modern academic center in 2012, the massive structure's future became the subject of intense, protracted debate within the community, often referred to simply as "The Old School." This controversy, widely covered in local news outlets, pitted the high value of historic preservation against the practical realities of high maintenance costs and the desire for new development. Regardless of the outcome, whether it is preserved as a monument or if its memory is retained through historical records, the legacy of the building, as a continuous hub for learning, politics, and culture for nearly a hundred years, is secured in the city's narrative.
