= Andrew Blackbird =

American tribe leader, historian and writer

- Makade-binesi
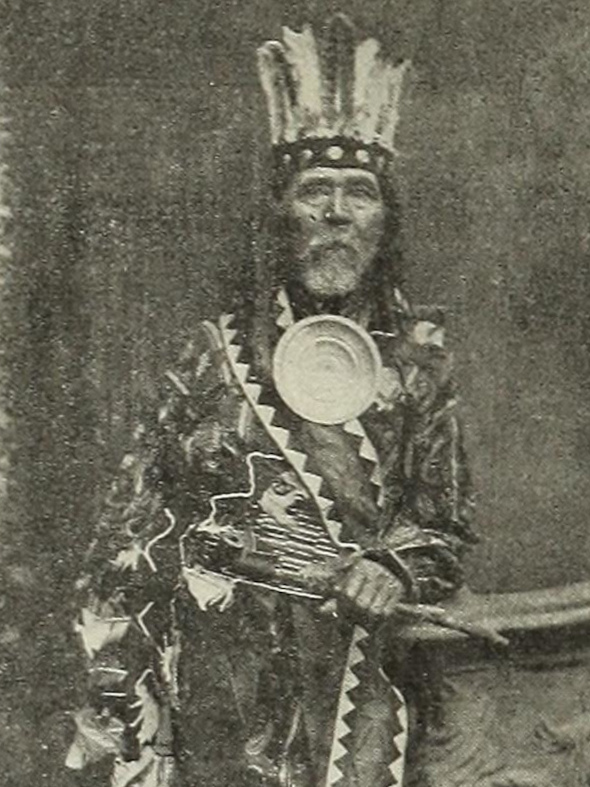
- Born: January 1814 (or 1815 possibly later); Michigan Territory, U.S.
- Died: September 1908; Harbor Springs, Michigan, U.S.
- Occupations: Ottawa Chief, Author, Interpreter
- Known for: Chief of the Ottawa, Politics, published History of the Ottawa and Chippewa Indians of Michigan

Andrew Jackson Blackbird (c. 1814 – 17 September 1908), also known as Makade-binesi ("Black Hawk"), was an Odawa (Ottawa) tribe leader and historian. He was author of the 1887 book, History of the Ottawa and Chippewa Indians of Michigan.

== Early life ==
Blackbird was born in the L'Arbre Croche area of Michigan (now Harbor Springs) around 1815. At least one account, though, places this date as late as 1821. His father was an Ottawa leader also named Makade-binesi, or "Black Hawk." The name was mistranslated first by the French and from French to English as "Blackbird", which became the family's English name. Makade-binesi was chief of the Arbor Croche or Middle Village band. Makade-binesi was stranded on a small island by white traders he was helping, and was left to die. Although his father survived, this cruelty left a strong impression on Andrew. The death of his brother, William, in Rome, Italy on June 25, 1833, under suspicious circumstances as he was completing his studies for the Roman Catholic priesthood, left an indelible impression on Andrew and perhaps was the source of his intense antipathy for that religion from then on.

Blackbird frequently bemoaned his limited formal education. Because his father was a chief, Blackbird was solidly educated in traditional Ottawa culture and practices.

Blackbird was baptized a Roman Catholic by a priest called Father Baden in 1825, but later converted to Protestantism. He served as interpreter at the Protestant mission in L'Arbre Croche. Even though he was a Christian, he knew the traditional Ottawa religious beliefs well.

Blackbird was trained as a blacksmith at mission schools in the L'Arbre Croche area. He studied for four years at Twinsburg Institute in Twinsburg in Summit County, Ohio, but left without graduating. In 1850 his elderly father's health worsened. This forced Blackbird to leave school and return home to assist the old chief. Later he attended Eastern Michigan University (then called Michigan State Normal School) in Ypsilanti, Michigan, for two years, but again did not graduate. In June 1858 Blackbird wrote his Twinsburg Institute mentor Rev. Samuel Bissell:

I continue to attend the State Normal School at Ypsilanti, but am getting somewhat discouraged as to ever being perfect in the knowledge of English Language. I have begun rather too late of attending those things. I shall always speak_ indistinctly ungrammatically for being so deeply rooted or stained with my own language....I have begun a grammar in the Indian tongue intended to write it upon the same plan in which our first books in Latin and Greek are written...And this I thought would be about as good that I can do for them, since I cannot personally do good among them, so at least, they can have my writings if not prohibited by their Priests...The last I heard of my father were still living but very old and feeble...Our school is let out on the 25th of July and vacation will last 10 or 11 weeks. I should like to have gone to visit my people but I am considerable in debt, therefore I will have to work out somewheres here during the time, in order to pay up my debts.

== Rise to recognition ==
Blackbird was loyal to the United States during various uprisings. In 1858 Blackbird married Elizabeth Margaret Fish, a white woman of English descent. As a result, he was viewed favorably by the United States.

By the 1850s, Blackbird had become a counselor for both sides between the United States government and the Ottawa and Ojibwa peoples. Blackbird helped veterans of the United States who were Native Americans receive their pensions. During this time, Blackbird also worked with fellow advocate Louise Obermiller to substantiate and defend claims to land ownership and annuities on behalf of Odawa and Ojibwa bands in Little Traverse Bay and nearby communities in northern Michigan, stipulated in treaties signed with the United States government in 1836 and 1855.

When the "Treaty With The Ottawa and Chippewa" was signed on July 31, 1855, Blackbird served as an interpreter, translator and official witness ().

In 1858, Blackbird bought a house in Harbor Springs, Michigan, and settled there permanently. At the time, Harbor Springs was still primarily populated by Ottawa. Blackbird became the town's postmaster, having been appointed by his friend Senator Thomas Ferry chairman of the United States Senate Committee on Post Office and Post Roads.

== History of the Ottawa and Chippewa Indians of Michigan ==
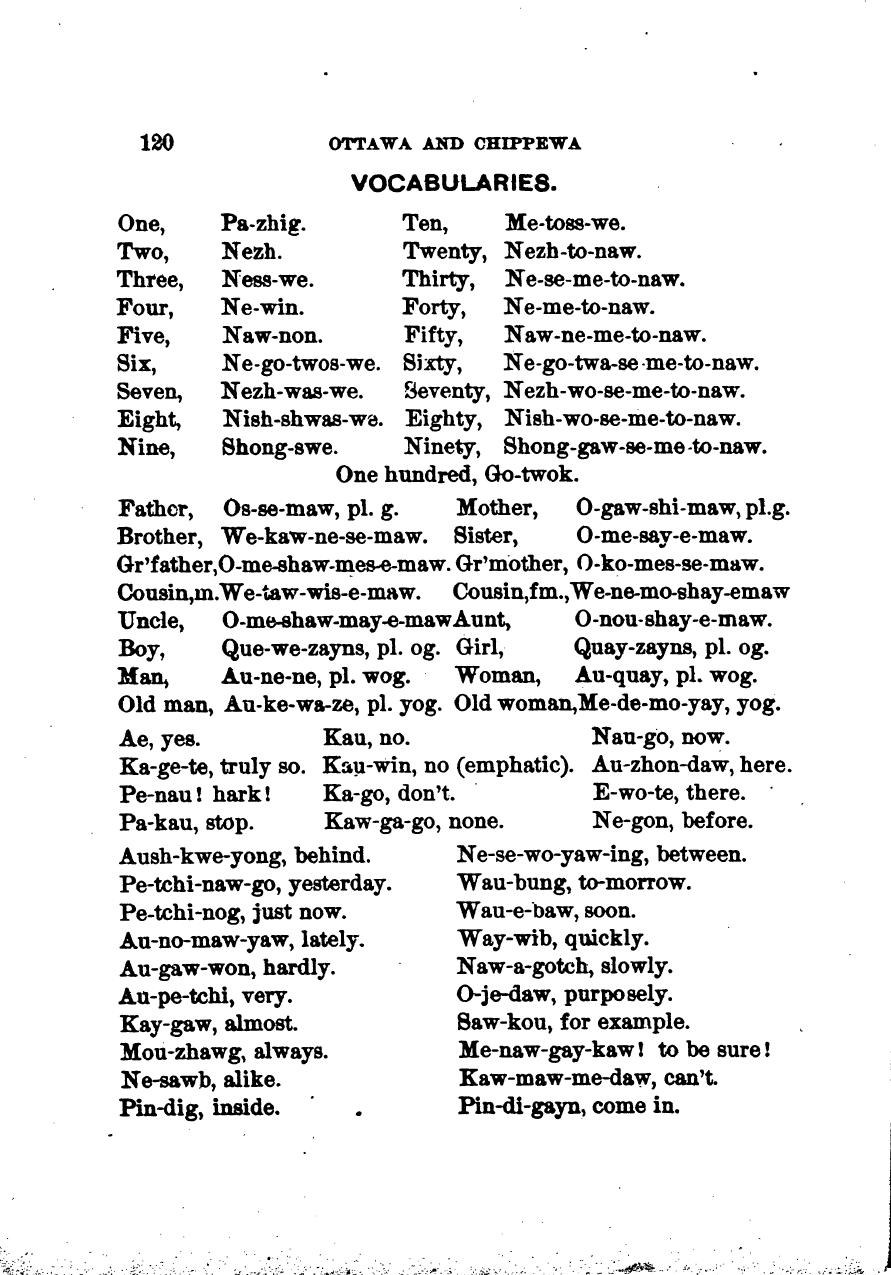
A page from a nineteenth-century history/language/biography publication by Andrew J. Blackbird.

In 1887, Blackbird published his History of the Ottawa and Chippewa Indians of Michigan. The work was published in Ypsilanti, Michigan, by the Ypsilantian Job Printing House. The book was among the first authoritative accounts of the Ottawa and Ojibwa (Chippewa) peoples ever published.

The book covers not only historical facts, but day-to-day details of how the Ottawa and Ojibwa hunted, fished and trapped before the coming of the whites. Blackbird explains many of the traditional beliefs and cultural practices of the two tribes. Because the author was himself a Native American, the book is free of the bias commonly found in books by white authors of the period.

Finally, the book includes a basic grammar of the Ottawa and Ojibwa languages.

== Views on White-Indian Relations ==
In a 1900 publication, Blackbird said:

But I have heard white people say that the Indians might just as well die, for nothing can be done with them, as they will always be wild and savage and cruel. They might as well all die or be killed, every one of them, from the face of the earth, for a dead Indian is better than a live Indian. These frightful statements are heard all over the United States and every Caucasian child and every Indian child that is able to understand, knows this dreadful feeling toward us. These statements are translated and republished in foreign countries so every foreigner coming to America comes with a prejudice and a persecuting spirit toward the aborigines of America. Therefore there is no peace nor shelter for the Indians, from injustice. They are exposed to hate, to be shot at, and to be robbed in every way and manner, of their little possessions of lands which the government has allotted to them in treaties. They are cheated by the crooked works of the law.

== Andrew J. Blackbird House ==
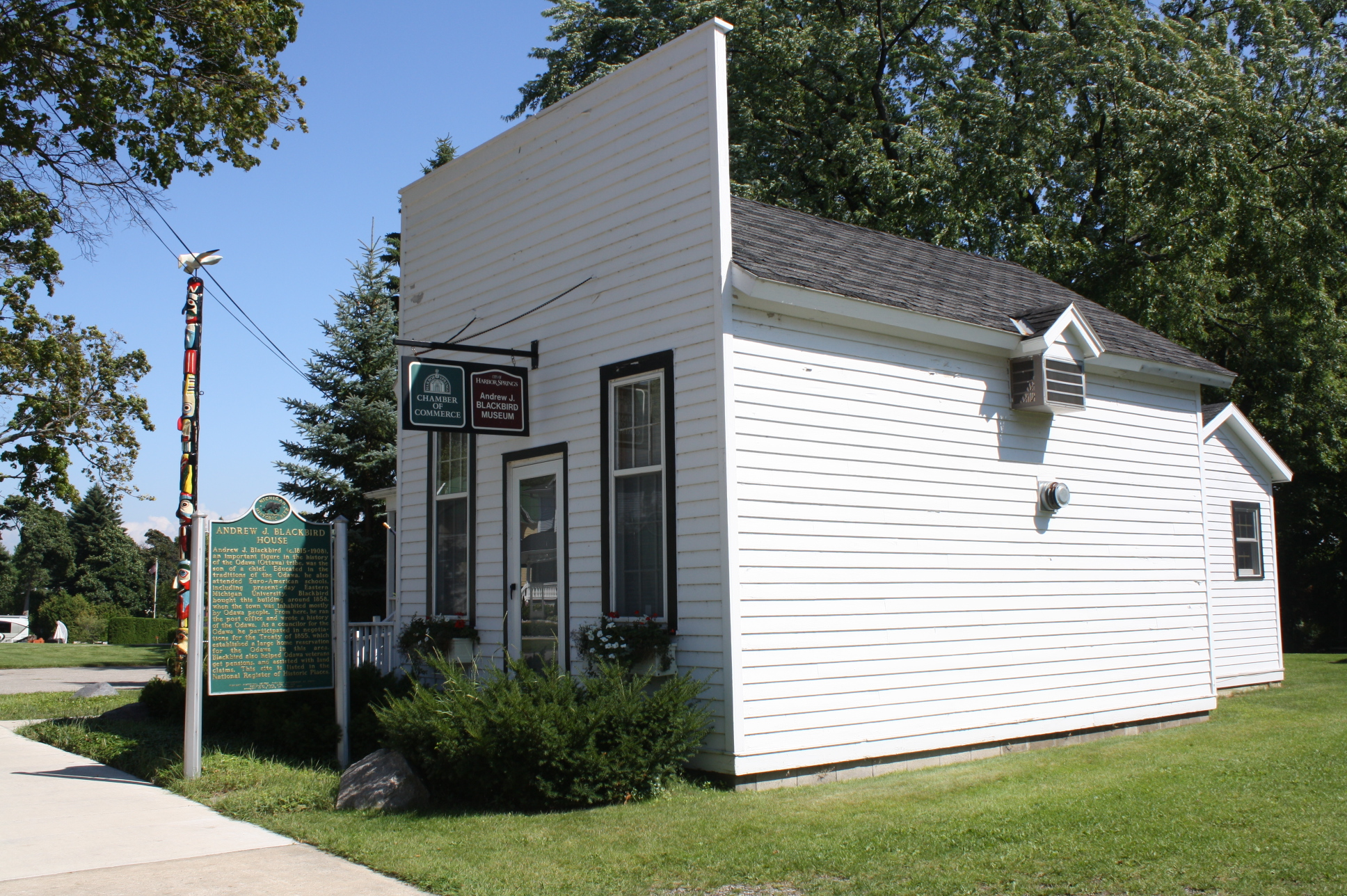
Blackbird's house

The Andrew J. Blackbird House in Harbor Springs, Michigan, is a museum of American Indian artifacts presented in the house in which Blackbird lived from 1858 until his death in 1908. There is a Michigan State Historical Marker at the site and the house itself is listed in the National Register of Historic Places.
