= Tom Anderson (disambiguation) =

Tom Anderson (born 1970) is an entrepreneur and co-founder of MySpace.

Tom Anderson may also refer to:

- Thomas E. Anderson, American computer scientist at the University of Washington
- Tom Anderson Jr. (1885–1915), Scottish-American golfer
- Tom Anderson (trade unionist) (1888–1964), New Zealand seaman and trade unionist
- Tom Anderson (fiddler) (1910–1991), fiddler, composer, folklorist and teacher
- Tom Anderson (Alaska politician) (born 1967), former member of the Alaska State Legislature
- Tom Anderson (Florida politician) (born 1933), former member of the Florida House of Representatives
- Tom Anderson (producer), American producer and screenwriter
- Ahmad Rezaee or Tom J. Anderson (1975/1976–2011), Iranian-American son of Mohsen Rezaee
- Tom Anderson (footballer) (born 1993), English footballer for Doncaster Rovers
- Tom Anderson (The Matrix) or Neo, a character from The Matrix
- Tom Anderson, a character in Beavis and Butt-Head
- Tom Anderson Guitarworks, American manufacturer of guitars and guitar pickups

== Similar names ==
- Cato Tom Andersen (born 1967), Norwegian former ice hockey defenceman
- Thom Andersen (born 1943), American filmmaker
- Tom Andersen, American politician

== See also ==
- Thomas Anderson (disambiguation)
- Tommy Anderson (disambiguation)
