= Tommy Anderson =

Tommy Anderson may refer to:

- Tommy Anderson (rugby league) (1887–1928), Australian rugby league footballer
- Tommy Anderson (footballer) (1934–2018), Scottish footballer (Watford FC, Stockport County)
- Tommy Anderson (ice hockey) (1910–1971), Canadian ice hockey defenseman

== See also ==
- Tommy Andersson (disambiguation)
- Tom Anderson (disambiguation)
- Thomas Anderson (disambiguation)
