= Ethan Alling =

American Pionner, and Founder of Twinsburg (1800-1868)

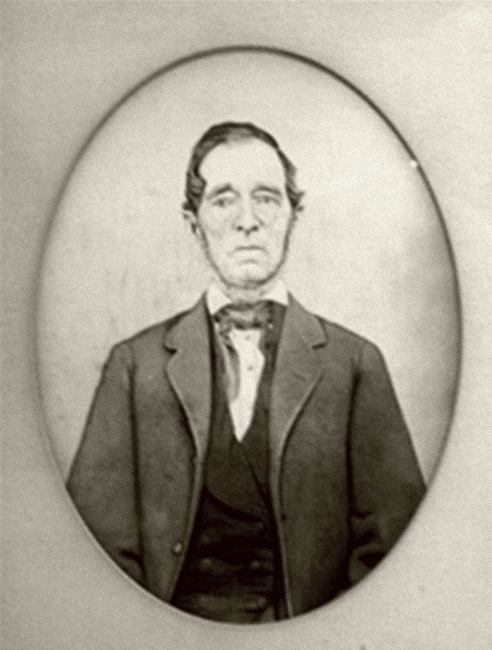
- Alling, c.1850-1860
- Born: August 13, 1800; Connecticut, U.S.
- Died: April 22, 1868 (aged 67); Twinsburg, Ohio, U.S.
- Occupations: Pioneer; Postmaster; Merchant; Hotelier; Stagecoach Operator
- Known for: First permanent settler of Twinsburg
- Spouse: Elvira Blackman Alling

Ethan Alling (August 13, 1800 – April 22, 1868) was an American pioneer, land agent, and civic leader who is recognized as the first permanent settler of Township 5, Range 10, of the Connecticut Western Reserve, which was initially called Millsville and later renamed Twinsburg, Ohio. Arriving in 1817 at the age of sixteen, Alling was instrumental in transitioning the unsettled land into a functioning community by establishing essential infrastructure, commerce, and civic institutions. His efforts laid the foundation for the town several years before the arrival of the Wilcox twins, who would ultimately bestow the town's unique name.

== Early life and settlement ==
Ethan Alling was born in Connecticut on August 13, 1800. The Alling family belonged to the wave of New Englanders who acquired land from the Connecticut Land Company following the partition of Ohio territory.

=== 1817 expedition ===
In March 1817, the 16-year-old Ethan Alling was tasked with traveling west to the designated township to survey, claim, and clear the 400 acres (160 ha) his family had purchased. This represented a major undertaking in the still largely unsettled frontier. He commenced his journey with three hired hands: Zeri Alling, Rodolphus Wolcott, and Lex Johnson.

Upon arrival, his initial tasks focused on survival and establishing a permanent presence. The first structure was a crude log dwelling, swiftly followed by a frame barn and a part of a frame house, built the following year. The first permanent residence was located on Ravenna Road, near the intersection of what is now Old Mill Road. Though other transient individuals had passed through, and Ezra Osborn is cited as the first woman settler arriving in July 1817, Alling is unequivocally recognized as the township's primary founder and first permanent inhabitant.

== Economic and civic development (Millsville era) ==
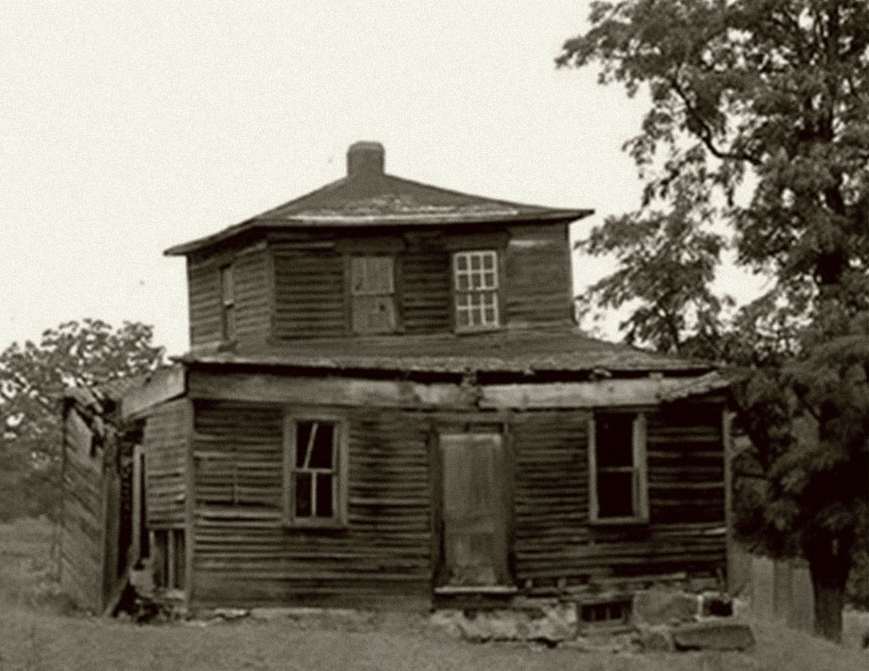
Alling's House in Newly formed Millsville

Alling's work formed the economic backbone of the community, which began to attract subsequent settlers and was initially known as Millsville, a name derived from the essential industrial structures he established.

=== Industrial infrastructure ===
To support the rapidly increasing need for processing raw materials, Alling focused on erecting mills.

Sawmill (1817): Constructed in the same year as his arrival, the sawmill was the first piece of industrial infrastructure in the township, crucial for converting local timber into lumber needed for permanent frame houses and buildings.

Gristmill (1818): Following the sawmill, Alling constructed a gristmill in 1818. This was perhaps more essential for long-term community growth, allowing settlers to grind grain for flour and ensuring a stable food supply, which encouraged families to remain in the area.

=== Commercial ventures and public service ===
In 1825, the community's first official post office was established, and Ethan Alling was appointed as the first postmaster. The post office was likely operated out of his residence or general store, serving as a vital communication link with the East.

Hotel and Stagecoach Line: Recognizing the township's location on a natural transit route, Alling operated a hotel and general store, serving as a merchant. Additionally, he ran a stagecoach line, positioning Millsville as a necessary stopover point for travelers journeying between major Ohio hubs. This commercial activity was essential in bringing external capital and transient workers into the local economy.

=== Founding of Locust Grove Cemetery ===
In addition to his commercial roles, Alling was responsible for establishing the town's primary public burial ground. Recognizing the need for a dedicated civic space, Alling founded the Locust Grove Cemetery in 1846. He donated a portion of his land for this purpose, and it became the final resting place for many of the township's early settlers and founders, including Alling himself, his wife, and the famous Wilcox twins.

== Twinsburg name change ==
The township's original name, Millsville, referenced the economic engines Alling had constructed. However, the name was officially changed to Twinsburg following the proposition by the brothers Moses and Aaron Wilcox, who arrived in 1819.

The Wilcox twins offered 6 acres (2.4 ha) of land for a town square, which became the geographic and civic heart of Twinsburg, along with $20.00 ($510.20 in 2025) toward the founding of the first schoolhouse, on the condition that the residents officially change the name of the settlement to Twinsburg. Although Alling was the founding settler, the community accepted the twins' offer, and the town was incorporated under the new name, celebrating the unique philanthropy of the Wilcox family.

== Secondary Schoolhouse ==
Alling saw the first true secondary school building in Twinsburg. In 1865, Reverend Samuel Bissell, an early educator and abolitionist, established the Twinsburg Institute on Main Road (now Darrow Road). It was not a public school, but a private academy intended to prepare students from across Summit County and Northeast Ohio for college and professional careers, same as Indians of the Seneca, Ottawa, and Potawatomi tribes. Bissell had spent decades educating local children and founded the institute, funding much of its operation. Alling, given his long tenure as a resident, community leader, and Living Founder of Twinsburg, would have witnessed the construction of the stone building, which stood as an influential building in Twinsburg.

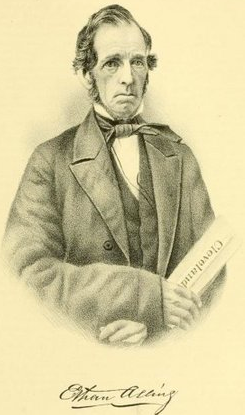
Alling, Signed Portrait, c. 1850-1860

== Personal life and legacy ==
Ethan Alling married Elvira Blackman Alling. Together, they were foundational members of the early Twinsburg community. Their family continued to contribute to the town, with their son G. H. Alling becoming a charter member of Summit Lodge #213. Ethan Alling died on April 22, 1868, at the age of 67.

Alling's original home, later rebuilt or significantly expanded (believed to be built around 1832), stood as a local landmark for many years and was documented in photographs as late as 1962, located on Route 14 near Old Mill Road.

Alling co-authored one of the earliest published accounts of the town's development, "History of Twinsburg 1860" with fellow resident Luman Lane. This work remains a primary source for understanding the first four decades of the settlement.
