= Alling (surname) =

Alling is an English, German and Danish surname. Notable people with the surname include:

- Alexander M. Alling (1807–1893), member of the 70th New York State Legislature and member of the Wisconsin State Assembly
- Benjamin W. Alling (1879–1950), American politician
- Charles Alling Gifford (1860–1937), American architect
- Ethan Alling (1800–1868), American pioneer, land agent and civic leader
- Lillian Alling, Eastern European hiker
- Morgan Alling (born 1968), Swedish actor, screenwriter and film and theatre director
- Nels N. Alling (1861–1955), American sculptor
- Paul H. Alling (1896–1949), American diplomat
