= Jean-Baptiste Assiginack =

- Born: c. 1768; Waganagisi
- Died: November 3, 1866; Manitowaning, Canada West
- Employer: British Indian Department
- Spouse: Theresa Catherine Kebeshkamokwe
- Children: Francis Assikinack
- Relatives: Andrew Jackson Blackbird

Jean-Baptiste Assiginack (c. 1768 - 3 November 1866) was an Odawa leader in the early 19th century. He was also known as "Blackbird," a literal translation of his name in the Anishinaabe language.

== Early life and War of 1812 ==
Assiginack is thought to have been born at what is now Harbor Springs, Michigan. Early in life he studied at a Sulpician school at the mission of Oka in Lower Canada where he became a Catholic. He seems to have fought with the British at Michilimackinac and Praries du Chien during the War of 1812. In July 1813, Assiginack and Captain Matthew Elliott led a band of Ottawas to the Niagara Peninsula. There they added to the British infantry and fought in the Beaver Dams battle. Possibly, Assiginack was subsequently honored with medals for his role in the war. Starting in 1815 he was an interpreter for the British Government on Drummond Island.

== After the War of 1812 ==
After the war, in 1815, the Indian Department at Drummond Island hired Assiginack as an interpreter. There he met Captain Thomas Gummersall Anderson, and a long friendship grew between the two men. Assiginack's command of several Indian dialects proved a crucial asset for the Indian Department’s operations in the northern Great Lakes area. Starting in 1827 he returned to Harbor Springs to work as a Catholic missionary, hoping a priest would soon join him, but had to carry out the efforts of Catholicizing the local Ojibwe population all on his own.

After the 1828 transfer of Drummond Island to the United States Assiginack lead a large number of Ojibwe to relocate to Penetanguishene. In 1832 he relocated to Coldwater, Ontario. He had continued his Catholic evangelizing activities, and at Coldwater convinced the prominent Chippewa leader John Aisance to switch from being a Methodist to being a Catholic.

== Move to Manitoulin Island ==
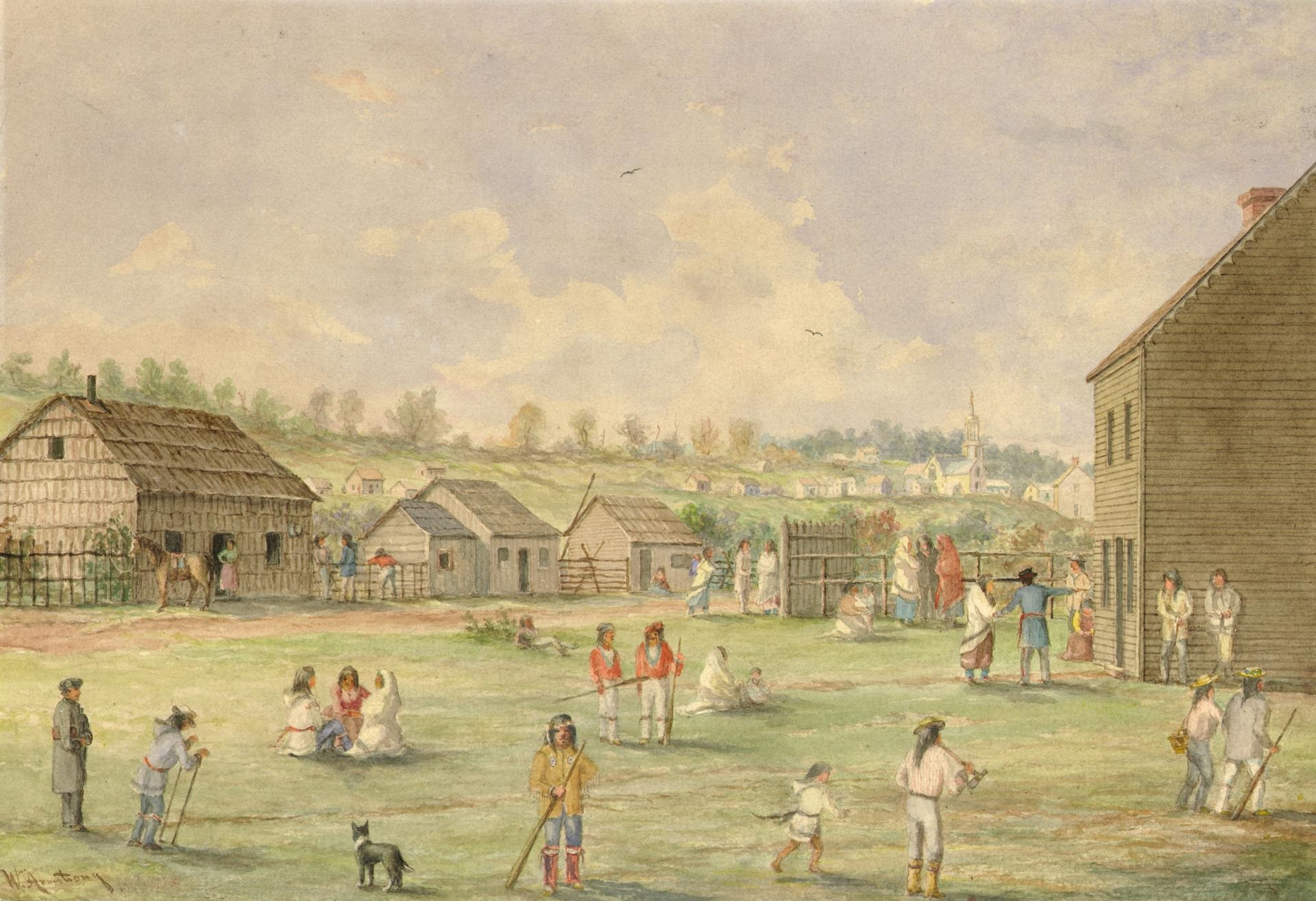
A view of an Anishinaabe village on Manitoulin Island in the 1850s

In 1836, Assiginack took part in the foundation of a new pan-Indigenous community on Manitoulin Island. Assiginack remained an important among the diverse communities that resettled here, and he was especially prominent among the Ojibwe who settled in the area around Manitowaning. Over the following years, Assiginack remained committed to the old alliance with the British and he generally supported various British treaties over the coming years.

In 1862 he was the leading spokesman for the British treaty while one of his sons, Edowishkosh, was a leading spokesman for the opposition faction based around Wikwemikong.
