= Elizabeth Bertrand =

Anishinaabe fur trader and leader (1760–1827)

Elizabeth Mitchell
- Omagigiwikway
- Born: Elizabeth Bertrand c. 1760 present-day Michigan
- Died: February 28, 1827; Drummond Island, Michigan
- Spouse: David Mitchell (m.1776)
- Children: David Mitchell, Daniel Mitchell, George Mitchell, Andrew Mitchell

Elizabeth Bertrand (Ojibwe: Omagigiwikway; c. 1760 – February 28, 1827), known as Elizabeth Mitchell after her marriage to the British army surgeon David Mitchell, was a prominent Anishinaabe fur trader and political leader around the Straits of Mackinac in the early 19th century. In her native Ojibwe language she was known as Omagigiwikway.

== Family background ==
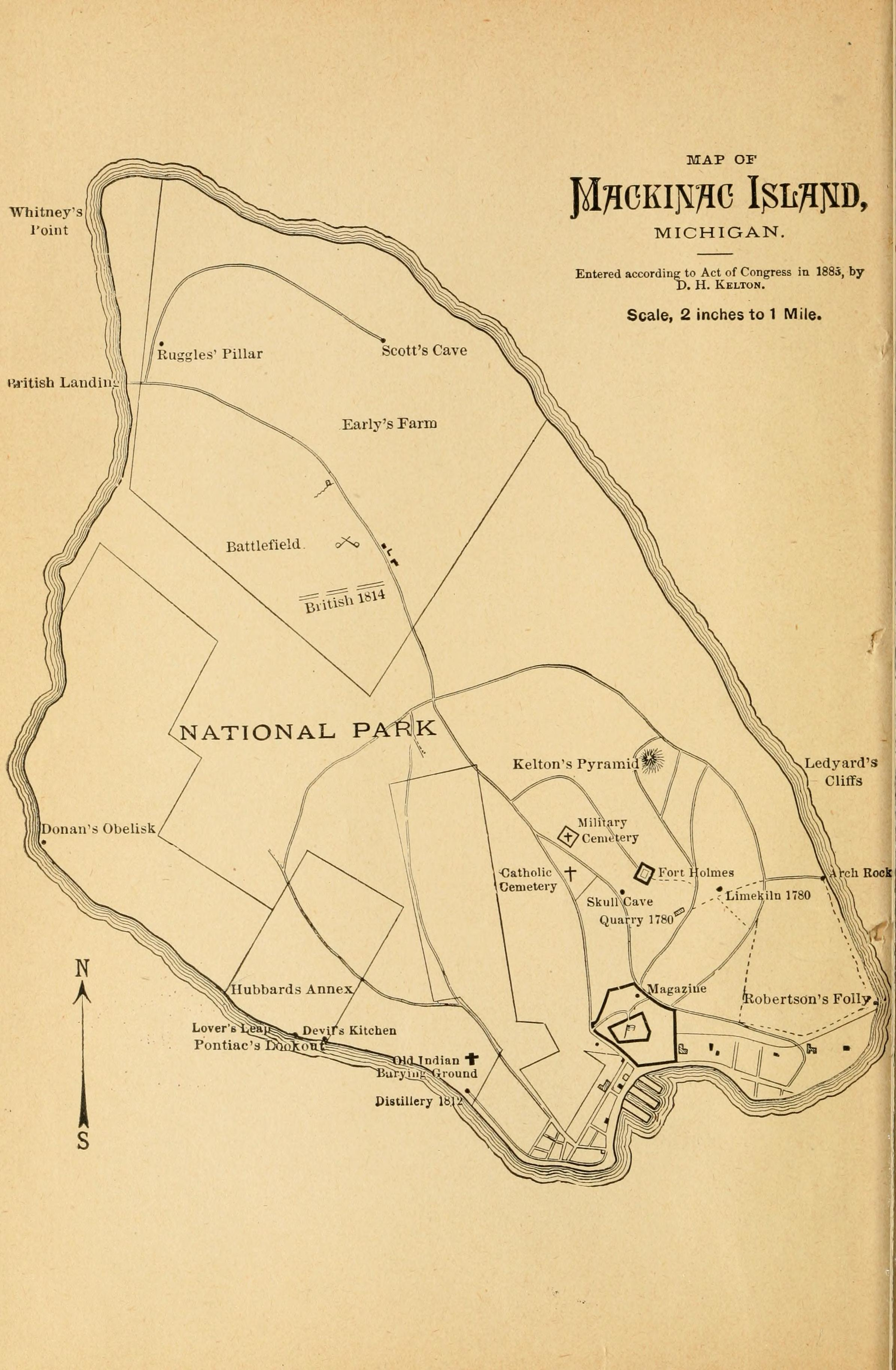
A Map of Mackinac in 1883, showing the site of the Battle of Mackinac. Elizabeth's home was on Market Street in the island's south.

Elizabeth Bertrand was born sometime after the middle of the 18th century. Her mother was an Ojibwe woman and her father was a French fur trader. Growing up in the Anishinaabe culture of her mother, it was reported that Elizabeth spoke a mixture of the Ojibwe and Odawa languages. In 1776, Elizabeth married the British army surgeon David Mitchell. Through their collaboration in the fur trade, the couple soon became one of the wealthiest families on the upper Great Lakes. From 1781 until 1811, the Mitchells lived in a grand house on Michilimackinac where they had numerous children. Elizabeth Mitchell and her family were described as "prominent, interesting, aristocratic, and wealthy" by the writer Elizabeth Therèse Baird, who was born on Mackainc in 1810.

== War of 1812 ==
During the War of 1812, Mitchell played an active role in mobilizing Indigenous warriors to fight against the United States. Her efforts were especially important in repelling the American attack on Mackinac in 1814. It was thanks to the leadership of prominent Anishinaabe individuals such as Elizabeth Mitchell and Jean-Baptiste Assiginack that American forces were consistently defeated in the region of the upper Great Lakes, despite important victories elsewhere. In recognition of her influence among the Anishinaabe communities around the Straits of Mackinac, the British government granted her an allowance of 50 pounds per year for a period of two years following the end of the war.

== Later life ==
The period following the War of 1812 was difficult for the Mitchell family. After Mackinac was returned to the Americans as per the Treaty of Ghent, David Mitchell withdrew with the British garrison to nearby Drummond Island in July 1815, where he was employed as a surgeon in the British Indian Department. Elizabeth however stayed on Mackinac Island to look after their interests there. The American government resented the role Elizabeth had played in the war, and for a number of years, U.S. officials attempted to bar her involvement in the fur trade. Elizabeth complained of her treatment to the British government, although little came from her complaints. Nonetheless, the Mitchells continued to be prosperous and influential on both sides of the international border despite the changing circumstance following the end of the War of 1812.

== Death ==
Elizabeth Bertrand died on February 28, 1827, while visiting her family at Drummond Island, Michigan.
