= Kevin O'Neill (American football) =

American football player (born 1975)

No. 59
- Position: Linebacker

Personal information
- Born: April 14, 1975 (age 51); Twinsburg, Ohio, U.S.
- Listed height: 6 ft 2 in (1.88 m)
- Listed weight: 239 lb (108 kg)

Career information
- High school: Walsh Jesuit (Cuyahoga Falls, Ohio)
- College: Bowling Green
- NFL draft: 1998: undrafted

Career history
- Detroit Lions (1998–2000)

Awards and highlights
- 2× first-team All-MAC (1996, 1997)

Career NFL statistics
- Total tackles: 15
- Stats at Pro Football Reference

Kevin Christopher O'Neill (born April 14, 1975) is an American former professional football player who was a linebacker in the National Football League (NFL). He played college football for the Bowling Green Falcons. An undrafted free agent, O'Neill played for the Detroit Lions of the NFL from 1998 to 2000.
