= Walsh Jesuit High School =

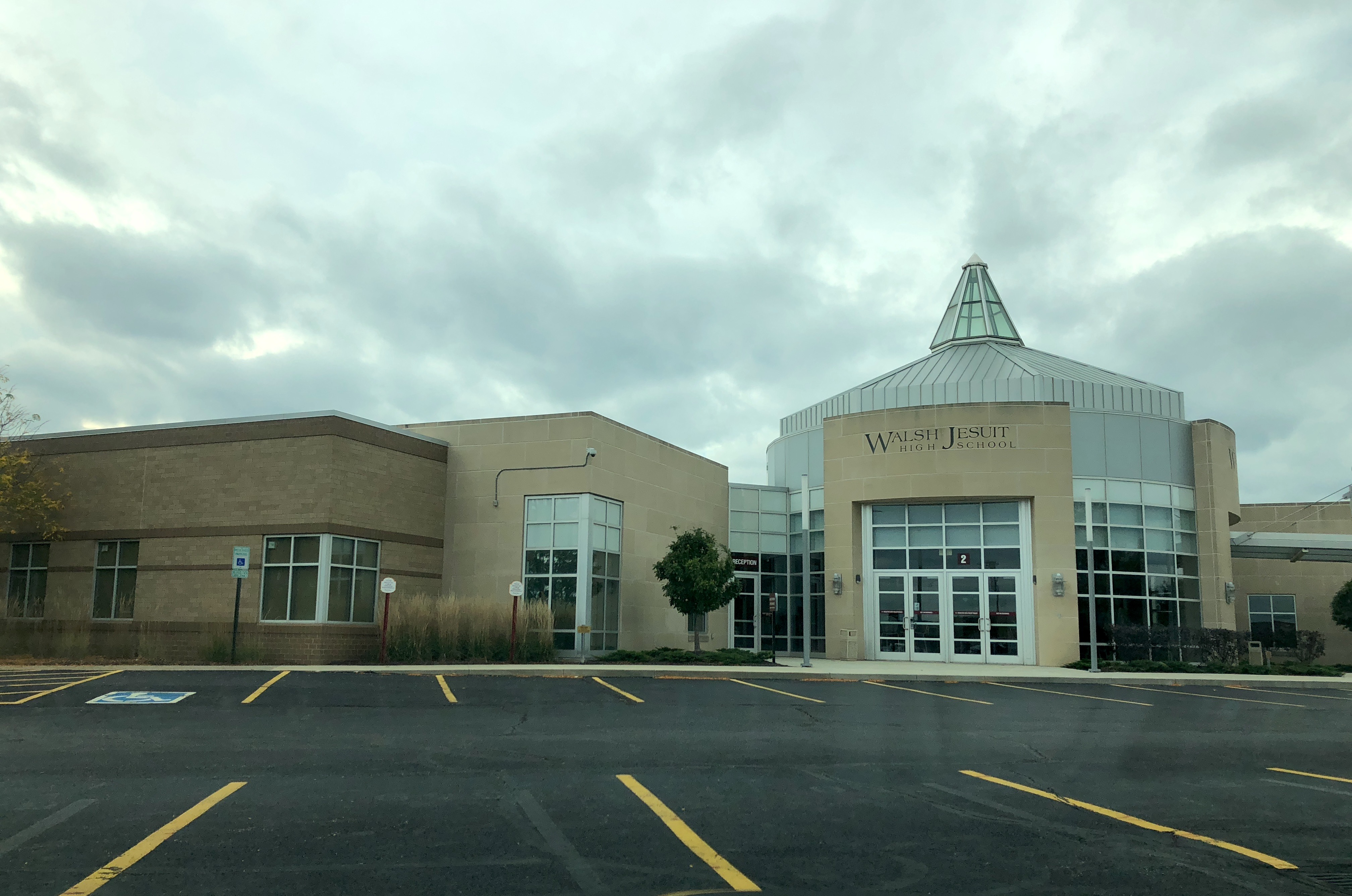
- 4550 Wyoga Lake Road; Cuyahoga Falls, Ohio 44224-1059; United States

Information
- Motto: Men and Women for and with Others
- Established: 1964; 62 years ago
- President: Tim Grady
- Colors: Maroon and gold
- Accreditation: Ohio Catholic Schools Accrediting Association; Ohio Department of Education
- Tuition: $16,500.00 (2026–27)
- Affiliation: Jesuit Schools Network
- Website: www.walshjesuit.org

Walsh Jesuit High School is a private, Catholic, co-educational college preparatory high school in the Jesuit tradition, located in Cuyahoga Falls, Ohio, approximately 30 miles (48 km) south of Cleveland.

Walsh's campus covers 110 acres (45 ha) and is situated near the Cuyahoga Valley National Park. The campus features five outdoor athletic fields, a 5,000 meter cross country track, a 1,600 seat gymnasium, a field house, wrestling room, an all-sports complex (formerly known as Conway Memorial Stadium), and a residence for the Jesuit priests that staff the school. The school's chapel, named in honor of its patron saints, the North American Jesuit Martyrs, is topped with the distinctive metallic cross which has become the school's most prominent symbol and landmark.

== History ==
Walsh Jesuit High School was funded by a generous gift from Cornelius Walsh (b. 1864), a prominent industrialist and Catholic layman who had lived his entire life in Cuyahoga Falls. Upon his death in 1932, Cornelius bequeathed his entire fortune to his wife, Jane, who continued to donate generously to Catholic institutions and, with the assistance of her nephew, William A. Walsh, designed her will to include a large gift for the foundation of a Catholic high school. William, partial to the Jesuits, convinced his aunt to bequeath to the Society of Jesus her property and $100,000 for the building of an all-boys school that would be a memorial to her husband. William approached the Chicago Province of the Jesuits with the proposal, but the gift lay dormant for years until found during a transfer of files from the Chicago Province to the Detroit Province in 1959. William urged Fr. John McGrail, S.J., the head of the Jesuits' Detroit Province, to reconsider the proposal made in Jane's will. The school's campus was originally planned to be built in downtown Cuyahoga Falls near St. Joseph Parish School, but using the gift from Jane (which had grown to $2 million under William's stewardship, and to which the Cleveland Catholic Diocese added $1 million), 50 acres were purchased from the Conway family farm north of downtown, with an additional 50 acres purchased later.

Groundbreaking ceremonies for Walsh Jesuit took place in 1964, and the school opened its doors to 153 freshmen on September 7, 1965. The school was dedicated in May 1966, and the first class graduated in 1969. All students were required to wear neckties, a shirt with a collar, and hair not falling over the ears. A "tie strike" was organized in 1969, which was easily quashed.

Initially founded as an all-boys institution similar to other prominent Northeast Ohio Catholic high schools, Walsh Jesuit's leadership decided to go co-ed in 1991 amid excess capacity and financial challenges to the school's continued existence. The decision was initially met with resistance by many Walsh Jesuit alumni and students, culminating in a student walkout, which received extensive local media coverage, when the news of the decision was made public. Despite the protests, the first girls entered the school at the beginning of the 1993–1994 academic year, and currently constitute approximately half of the overall student population.

Walsh's mascot is the "Warriors," originally conceived as a reference to the Seneca Indians that had historically inhabited the school's campus locality. However, in 2021, as a response to the Native American mascot controversy, the school formally disassociated the name "Warriors" from any reference to Native American culture, removed Native American iconography from its sports uniforms and facilities, and changed the name of its annual fundraising gala.

== Athletics ==
Walsh Jesuit has won seven team national championships and a total of 39 Ohio High School Athletic Association team state championships. The school is also home to 113 individual state championships in various sports. Walsh Jesuit currently competes in the Crown Conference, since the beginning of the 2021–22 school year. Walsh Jesuit was previously a member of the North Coast League from 2011 to 2020. The school also hosts the Walsh Jesuit Ironman Tournament, one of the "big three" in-season high school wrestling tournaments.

=== National championships ===
- Boys' Wrestling - 1993, 1994, 1995, 1996
- Girls' Soccer - 2000, 2006, 2010

=== State championships ===
- Boys' Cross Country – 1984, 2002
- Boys' Baseball – 1999, 2004, 2006, 2008
- Football – 1999
- Boys' Wrestling – 1991, 1993, 1994, 1995, 1996, 1997, 1999, 2000
- Boys' Golf – 1990, 1991, 1996, 1997
- Boys' Soccer – 1982, 1990, 2006
- Girls' Golf – 2001, 2004, 2007
- Girls' Soccer – 2000, 2001, 2004, 2006, 2010, 2012, 2013, 2014, 2015, 2016, 2023
- Softball – 2002, 2004, 2016
- Girls' Basketball – 2005

== Notable alumni ==
- Ryan Armour (1994), professional golfer on the PGA Tour
- Dominic Canzone (2016), MLB outfielder for the Seattle Mariners
- Christopher Connor (1974), CEO of Sherwin-Williams Co.
- Connor Cook (2011), quarterback for the Michigan State Spartans and Oakland Raiders
- Ryan Feltner (2015), MLB pitcher for the Colorado Rockies
- Steve Fitzhugh (1982), former NFL safety with the Denver Broncos
- Drew Kaser (2011), former NFL punter
- Brock Kreitzburg (1994), member of the USA-1 four man bobsled team that placed seventh in the 2006 Winter Olympics
- Tom Lopienski (1998), former Notre Dame and NFL fullback
- Kenneth Merten (1979), United States Ambassador to Croatia
- Tim Murphy (1970), member of the United States House of Representatives
- Michael Nanchoff (2007), 8th overall pick of the Vancouver Whitecaps
- Kevin O'Neill (1993), former NFL linebacker
- Adam Redmond (2011), NFL offensive guard
- Jason Rohrer (1996), game designer
- Mike Vrabel (1993), NFL head coach for the New England Patriots, former NFL linebacker and former head coach for the Tennessee Titans
- Kyra Dossa, freestyle aerials skier at the 2026 Winter Olympics
- Milan Parris (2026), Miami (FL) wide receiver commit

== See also ==
- List of Jesuit sites
