= Alright, It was Frank... and He's Risen From the Dead and Gone Off With His Truck =

Alright It Was Frank...And He's Risen From the Dead and Gone Off With His Truck

Studio album by Thomas Anderson
- Released: 1989 (re-released in 1993)
- Studio: The Rock (Norman, Oklahoma)
- Genre: Country rock
- Label: Out There, Dutch East India Trading
- Producer: Thomas Anderson, Todd Walker

Thomas Anderson chronology
Alright It Was Frank...And He's Risen From the Dead and Gone Off With His Truck (1989)	Blues for the Flying Dutchman (1993)

Alright It Was Frank...And He's Risen From the Dead and Gone Off With His Truck is the first studio album by American country-rock musician Thomas Anderson. It was first released in 1989 on Anderson's own label Out There Records, and was re-released in 1993 by Dutch East India Trading. Its title is taken from a line from the science fiction film It Came from Outer Space.

== Commercial impact ==
After receiving favorable reviews from multiple critics, including Robert Christgau, Alright It Was Frank... found its way to multiple other rock music critics, including Blurt's Fred Mills and Jud Cost. According to Anderson, a copy of the album also made its way to an independent record store in Germany, which prompted the store's owner to start his own label, Blue Million Miles Records.

== Reception ==
Professional ratings
Review scores
Source	Rating
Christgau's Consumer Guide	A–
The Gavin Report	(favorable)
Rolling Stone	4/5 stars

Alright It Was Frank... received favorable reviews from multiple music critics, including Robert Christgau, who gave it an A−. The Washington Post's Geoffrey Himes also reviewed the album favorably, writing that "it takes country-rock from the heartland, speeds it up and crams it full of the twisted commentary only a former rock critic could come up with." John Wooley of Tulsa World also gave the album a favorable review, describing it as "an album that sizzles with conviction" and "one that seldom lets its substantial intellect get in the way of its emotion."

== Track listing ==
1	Wish You Were Here
2	Sweet Sweet Rock'n'Roll
3	Lucy Daylight
4	Love's Gonna Bring You Down
5	55 Belle Avenue
6	Hearts
7	Vaudeville
8	She Looks Like Rickie Lee Jones
9	Marilyn Says
10	The Bride and the Broomstick
11	For Charlie and Liz
