= Grey Cloud Woman =

Dakota woman and island namesake

Grey Cloud Woman (Dakota: Maḣpiya Ḣota Wiŋ, born c. 1793; died 1850) was the woman for whom Grey Cloud Island in Washington County, Minnesota was named. She was born around 1793 at the village of Prairie du Chien to a Dakota mother, also named Grey Cloud Woman, and a Scottish fur-trading father, James Aird. Grey Cloud lived through the final years when the fur trading economy was dominant in the region around the northern Mississippi River. She married her first husband, English-Canadian fur trader Thomas Gummersall Anderson, while just a young girl of 15. Together, they lived and traveled between several trading posts, including those at Patterson's Rapids and Pike Island. The couple had two children who survived infancy, Angus and Jane. Grey Cloud Woman was directly affected by the War of 1812, when her husband, who fought on behalf of the British, chose to return to Canada rather than live under American rule. Rather than follow him, Grey Cloud Woman separated from him and returned to her parents' home.

Grey Cloud later sent both her young children to live with their father in Canada. She remarried to another fur trader from New York, Hazen Mooers, in about 1825. Grey Cloud Woman's family connections facilitated trading relationships for both her husbands, and she and Mooers built a new trading post called Little Rock. During the negotiations for the Treaty of 1837, Grey Cloud was a signatory to a letter arguing on behalf of people of mixed Dakota ancestry and later was a beneficiary of the treaty settlement. The marriage produced three daughters, Mary, Jane Anne and Madeline. Later, she and her family lived approximately 15 miles south and east of modern-day St. Paul, Minnesota on the Mississippi River island that would come to bear her name from 1838 to 1846. She was one of the first people to farm wheat on the island, representing a larger shift away from dependence on the regional fur trade and greater economic power of farming. Grey Cloud died in 1850.

== Name meaning ==
Maḣpiya Ḣota in the Dakota language means "Grey Cloud". With the addition of "Wiŋ" (woman), the English translation of her name is Grey Cloud Woman. She also had an English name, Margaret Aird (sometimes spelled Ayrd). Grey Cloud Woman was named after her mother, also called Maḣpiya Ḣota Wiŋ, and thus she is sometimes referred to as Grey Cloud Woman II.

== Parents ==
Grey Cloud Woman was the daughter of James Aird and Grey Cloud Woman I, for whom she was named. Aird (born 1757) immigrated to Canada in 1783 from Ayrshire, Scotland. He was employed by the Hudson's Bay Company. He was reportedly a cousin of the Ayrshire poet Robert Burns. Grey Cloud Woman I was the daughter of Wabasha I, a chief of the Mdewakanton band of the Dakota people. She was born in the mid- to late-1770s in the village of Wapaha Sa Prairie, near modern-day Winona, Minnesota. Wabasha's band had established French kinship ties, but later aligned themselves with the British during the French and Indian War of 1756–1763. Wabasha was commissioned as a British army officer and fought against Americans and in defense of the village of Prairie du Chien. She had at least one brother, Wabasha II, who also became a leader of the Mdewakanton.

== Early life ==
Grey Cloud Woman was born around 1793 in the village of Prairie du Chien, a settlement in modern-day Wisconsin bounded by the Mississippi and Wisconsin rivers on land of the Ho-Chunk (Winnebago), Očhéthi Šakówiŋ, and Sauk and Meskwaki. Her first language was Dakota and she also spoke French and learned some English. Prior to her birth, her parents had used Prairie du Chien as an operating base, but traveled widely in the trading business. After she was born, they settled more permanently on the first street in the main village, although her father continued to travel extensively for his work. In 1805, Aird spent several years leading a trading expedition in North Dakota. Most of the families in town supported themselves with a combination of farming and engagement in the fur trade. In 1811, a visitor to the village noted that the town produced a surplus of crops, including corn, wheat and vegetables. In the early 1810s, fruit trees were planted, producing plums and cherries, though these may not have been available during Grey Cloud's earlier childhood.

At the time, the houses were mostly made of logs plastered with mud, though a few frame houses were built by 1805. Grey Cloud likely grew up in relative comfort. Her father became successful in business and by 1810 he was the largest property owner in Prairie du Chien. At its height, he owned multiple farm lots, a grain mill and several lots in the village. Grey Cloud was an only child, but grew up surrounded by a large extended family. Four of her mother's sisters had also married White men and lived in the village with their families. Their immediate environs consisted of about 18 other households, and their next-door neighbors were Joseph Rolette and his wife Margaret and their children. Margaret Rolette was Grey Cloud's maternal aunt.

There was no school in the village and no record of what kind of education Grey Cloud Woman might have received. Grey Cloud Woman likely knew her future husband, Thomas Anderson, in passing as a child, as he came through the village multiple times each year from 1800 to 1808. Anderson described the villagers as "kind and hospitable, and prided themselves on their honesty and punctuality in paying their debts, and keeping their engagements." Grey Cloud was only about 15 years old when she married for the first time.

== Marriage to Thomas Anderson ==
Grey Cloud Woman married Thomas Gummersall Anderson (born 1778, died 1874), around 1808. Anderson was born in Canada. In 1800, at twenty, he traveled by birch bark canoe from Montreal to Mackinac Island, in modern-day Michigan. He was outfitted as a trader and navigated the Fox River to arrive at Grey Cloud Woman's home village of Prairie du Chien, in present-day Wisconsin, a few weeks later. He stayed several days before moving on to his winter post downriver, however he passed through the village approximately twice annually over the ensuing years. He began working with the Santee Dakota in 1806 and became acquainted with James Aird, Grey Cloud Woman's father, for whom he worked for a period.

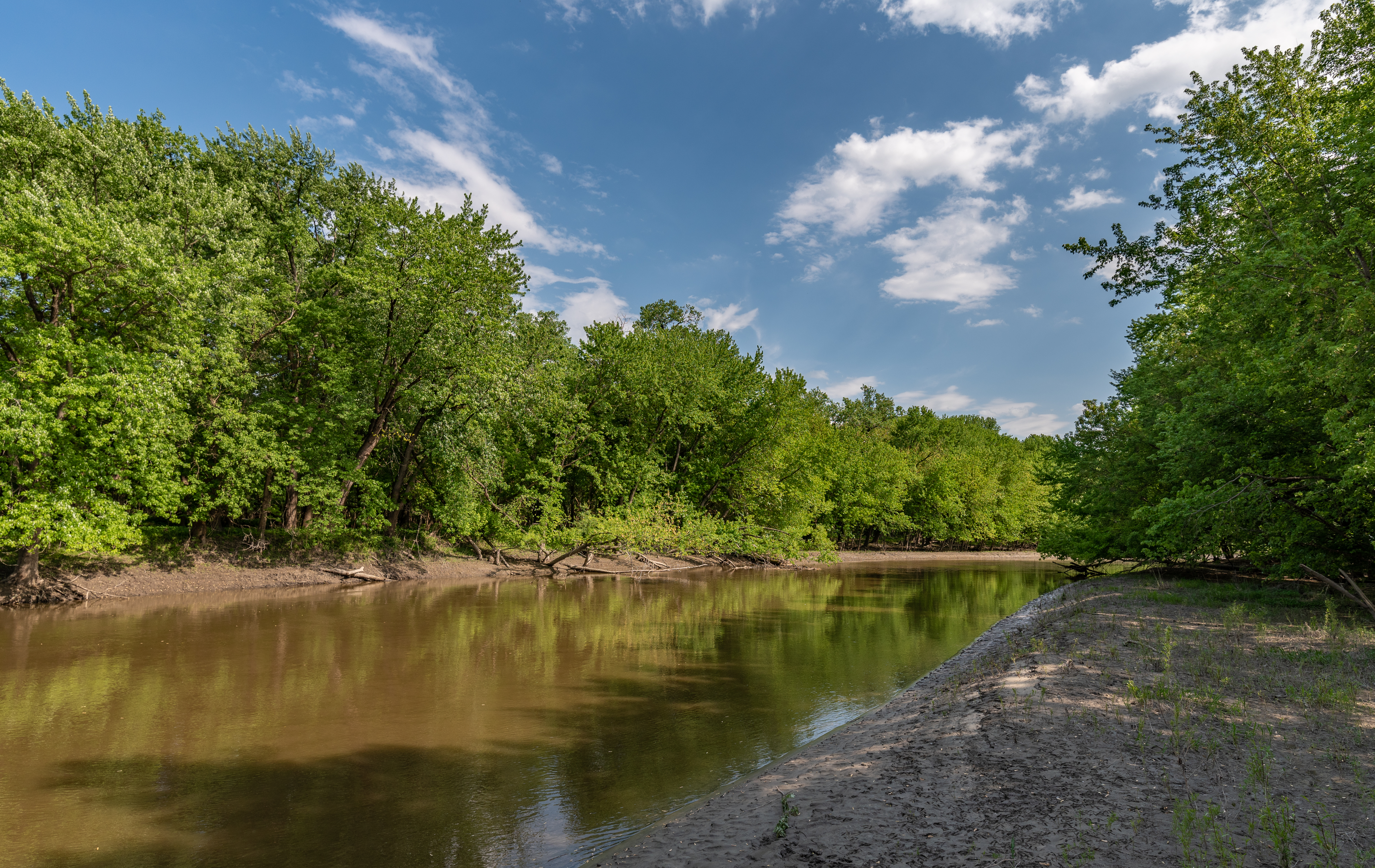
View of the Mississippi River from Pike Island, where Grey Cloud Woman lived with her family between 1811 and 1814.

When Grey Cloud Woman and Thomas Anderson married, she was about 15 years old and he was about 30. Her reasons for marrying Anderson are unknown. A native English speaker, he did not speak her first language, Dakota, and perhaps spoke little French either. Marriages between White fur traders and Dakota women were common in the village and were seen as mutually beneficial. Dakota women were generally not forced to marry and such marriages were not necessarily seen as permanent lifetime commitments. In a memoir written by Anderson in the late 1800s, he wrote of his marriage: "following the custom of the country, which I had hitherto resisted, I took to live with me a little half-breed." Anderson may have been motivated to marry Grey Cloud to forge business connections with both her father, Aird, and her mother's family among his Dakota trading partners.

Grey Cloud bore a son, Angus Malcolm, around 1809. From 1810 to 1814, the young family would visit James Aird at a northerly summer trading post called Patterson's Rapids, near the mouth of the Yellow Medicine river. It was here that Grey Cloud Woman gave birth to a daughter, likely in August 1810. The baby's English name was Jane and her Dakota name translated as Daybreak Woman. Grey Cloud bore one additional child with Anderson, a baby girl named Mary or Marion, who did not survive infancy.

The couple spent the winter of 1810 together, trading at a location on the St Croix River, before Anderson was reassigned in the spring of 1811 to Pike Island. The family maintained a trading post there for the following three years. Grey Cloud Woman planted a garden, which included corn and potatoes. The island was well-suited to access and trade with Dakota villages that lined both rivers and the family socialized with the travelers passing through. In summers, they would join Dakota friends in hunting parties. Grey Cloud and her children also frequently visited her parents in Prairie du Chien, remaining with them when Anderson was traveling for work.

=== Separation ===
In 1814, the couple separated. In his memoir, Anderson claimed that Grey Cloud Woman took their children and left him in March of that year, after which he never saw her again. However, Anderson lived for the next 14 months at the fort, next-door to the village at Prairie du Chien, where Grey Cloud and the children lived, making it highly likely he continued to have some contact with them. His journal from this time contains records of meeting with James Aird, her father. In May 1815, following the end of the war, Anderson was ordered to return to Canada. While Anderson's journal implied that Grey Cloud Woman left him for no reason, the story passed down by their descendants is more forthcoming: after Anderson resolved to return to Canada permanently, he asked Grey Cloud Woman to come with him. According to the story, she declined, refusing to leave Mni Sota Makoce, her homeland.

== War of 1812 ==
=== Wartime activities ===
The build-up and war began to effect trading patterns and the relationships that supported the fur traders and their families. Both Grey Cloud's father and husband were involved in wartime activities. James Aird was technically an American citizen, having declared his nationality around 1805 after discovering while in St. Louis, Missouri that foreign traders were banned from the fur trade in regions covered by the Louisiana Purchase. He was able to establish citizenship by a mechanism provided for in Jay's Treaty, which allowed those who had lived in the country prior to 1796 and had not explicitly declared themselves British citizens, to claim American citizenship. However, he served as a British agent during the war, encouraging Native people to fight on behalf of the British. In 1810, Anderson participated in blockade-running to move goods past an American installation at Fort Mackinac. In August 1814, a letter from a fur trader and friend of Aird and Anderson indicated the difficulties in continuing to conduct trade and travel freely, writing:

"What greaves me the most is that I am prevented from Seeing you & my other friends Mr Aird & anderson & all those that I have ben so many years living in friendship with in that country. I Shall remain at york till late in the fall in hopes of being able to get in to Mackinac with my old friends if it does not fall and if in case that it unfortunately Should fall in the americans hands I shall be obliged much against my will to go Back to montreall."

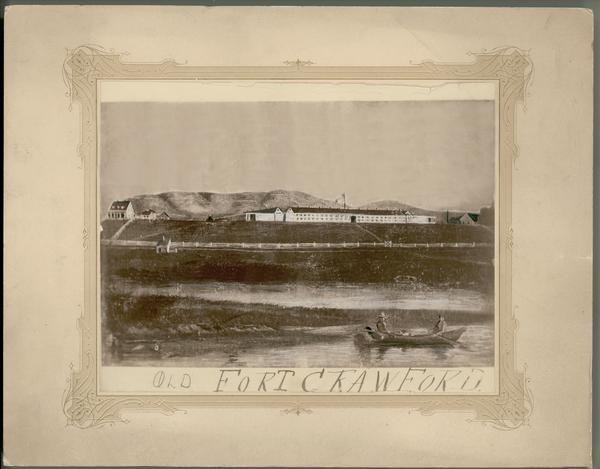
Fort Crawford in 1840.

In 1814, Anderson learned that Americans had built a fort directly next to Prairie du Chien, a strategic site in the control of the fur trade, while traveling to Mackinac on business. He received a commission while visiting the British commander at Mackinac and led a group of volunteer fur traders back to Prairie du Chien. He made efforts to persuade the Dakota to fight against the Americans and picked up additional native warriors along the way back. Anderson's volunteers were able to take the fort during the siege of Prairie du Chien and defended it successfully against subsequent attack. Anderson became commander of the fort, which was renamed Fort McKay, until May 1815, when he was ordered to surrender it following the British defeat.

=== Aftermath ===
Following Anderson's retreat to Canada, Grey Cloud Woman and her two children returned to life in the village of Prairie du Chien. In June 1816, American troops arrived under the command of Brig. Gen. Thomas Smith and began building Fort Crawford on the same site as Fort McKay. In the winter of 1817 or 1818, Grey Cloud Woman's neighbor and relative, Joseph Rolette, was banished for unclear reasons and forced to spend the winter alone on an island seven miles upriver, before being allowed back. Other men in town were arrested, either for their participation in the war, or on other grounds. Smith's soldiers also dispossessed certain families from their homes, razing them to the ground or re-allocating them to his soldiers. Martial law prevailed. According to one witness with regards to conditions in Prairie du Chien at the time: "our government had received the country by treaty stipulation, the officers of the army treated the inhabitants as a conquered people, and the commandants assumed all the authority of governors of a conquered country, arraigning and trying the citizens by courts-martial and sentencing them to ignominious punishments". These conditions remained until about 1819, when a new commander heralded milder conditions in town.

By 1820, the combined population of the village and nearby fort was more than 500 people, with quantities of summer visitors. Prairie du Chien served as a depot in support of at least six other trading posts. Visiting Native people would set up camp outside the village. There was no church nor permanent Christian minister in town until the 1830s, and newly arrived town resident Willard Keyes was shocked in 1817 at the lack of observance of the sabbath by the townspeople; he thought they spent too many of their leisure hours playing sports, eating and drinking. In 1818, Grey Cloud Woman sent her children to a local school whose builder and teacher were the same man, Keyes. As teacher, Keyes noted that only a few students could speak English and resorted to a French-English dictionary to communicate with the children. Another part-time resident of Prairie du Chien during this period, John Shaw, decided to abandon the town due to "civil law not being very much in force" and the "petty tyrannies" of the current commander at the fort. The town's first jail was built between 1820 and 1821.

== Death of James Aird ==
Grey Cloud and her two children moved back in with her parents, James Aird and Grey Cloud Woman I following the war and separation from Anderson. Aird had continued working as a fur trader. He had a rough time and nearly starved in the winter of 1814-1815 while at a winter trading post and subsequently stayed mostly in town. He worked for American Fur from 1816 to 1819. In 1818, a visitor who met with Grey Cloud's father, James Aird, noted that he had been "drinking heavily". Grey Cloud's father became embroiled in a lawsuit against his neighbor that year, Joseph Rolette. The source of the dispute was a May 4, 1818 land deal in which Aird bought Rolette's entire land holdings in town for $9000. By May 16, the two men were in legal dispute over the deal. Hazen Mooers, Aird's employee at American Fur and Grey Cloud's future husband, reported in a letter in December 1818 that Aird was in poor health. He died in the winter or early spring of 1819 in a tavern, supposedly after choking on a wild rice hull. Grey Cloud and her mother inherited Aird's estate, and began selling land almost immediately. Grey Cloud Woman and her mother sold their home lot in the village, but continued living in Prairie du Chien until 1825, perhaps as renters. Mother and daughter also sold seven acres of farmland that year.

== Departure of children ==
Anderson resettled in 1815 on Drummond Island on what was believed at the time to be the Canadian side of Lake Huron, in another fur-trading community. Following the war, where Anderson attained the rank of Captain in the British army, he was appointed as storekeeper and clerk for the Indian Department of Upper Canada (then a part of the British army), a position he would keep for 43 years. Anderson remarried in 1820 to a woman named Elizabeth "Betsy" Hamilton, a member of a well-connected fur trading family with French, English and Ojibwe ancestry. Following the birth of their first child, Anderson, at the urging of his new wife, wrote to Grey Cloud in 1821 or 1822, inviting their children to live with his family indefinitely and receive an English education.

Grey Cloud sent both children to Anderson in the summer of 1823. Jane and Angus would have been about 13 and 15, respectively and Grey Cloud was about 30 years old. There is no extant account of Grey Cloud's reasons for taking such a step, but Jane Lamm Carroll, biographer of Jane Anderson, speculates that Grey Cloud was likely motivated by a desire to help her children receive a better education. She may also have been in financial hardship as it had been four years since Aird's death and the loss of his income. Carroll believes that Grey Cloud viewed the separation as a permanent one, noting that it was common practice at the time to name babies after older children who had died. Grey Cloud named another daughter, born in 1827, Jane Anne, perhaps indicating, according to Carroll, that she had no expectation of seeing her elder children alive again.

Angus was sent to an English-language boarding school in Sandwich within the first year after rejoining Anderson, while Jane lived with the family for five years, before attending the Mackinaw Mission School, run by Presbyterians, on Mackinac Island for four years. During this time, she converted to Christianity and learned to write in English. Jane had a close relationship with her step-mother, Betsy.

== Marriage to Hazen Mooers ==
Grey Cloud Woman subsequently married Hazen Mooers (born 1789). Mooers was originally from New York and had participated in the Battle of Plattsburgh in 1814 as a member of "Aiken's Volunteers", as a member of a group of 14-17 year old civilian volunteers. For their bravery, each boy, including Mooers, was awarded a rifle by Congress, the only time such an award was granted to civilians. He became an employee of American Fur in March 1818 after being hired in Montreal to serve as a clerk, and arrived in Prairie du Chien soon after. Mooers was described as a "thin, good looking man." At some point, he married a Dakota woman, and had a son named John from this first marriage. When he first arrived, Mooers worked for James Aird. While not yet married to her mother, he and Grey Cloud Woman's young daughter, Jane Anderson (aged about 7 or 8) were both present when Aird died at Prairie du Chien in the winter of 1819. He subsequently traveled that year to establish two trading posts in western Minnesota. Later, he operated a trading post at Lake Traverse in the 1820s and early 1830s on behalf of the American Fur company, and both Grey Cloud and her mother left Prairie du Chien and lived with him. The marriage produced three daughters, Mary (born c. 1826), Jane Anne (born c. 1827) and Madeline (born c. 1830).

=== Timing of marriage ===
The timing of the couple's marriage is unclear but likely occurred in 1824 or 1825. When Grey Cloud sent her children to their father in 1823, she was not yet married to Mooers. Their first documented child was born in 1826.

== Return of Anderson children ==
Jane Anderson left the mission school in 1832, while Angus departed in 1834. Both briefly returned to their father and step-mother, now living in a community called Coldwater on another part of Lake Huron, after evacuating Drummond Island when it became clear it would become part of America. Angus worked for a short time for his father as a clerk for the Coldwater Agency, while Jane became a teacher. Angus returned to the American side of the border first, and by 1837 worked as a clerk for Henry Hastings Sibley at the Mendota trading post.

Jane married Andrew Robertson in 1835. Robertson was a well-traveled, well-educated Scotsman, and twenty years her senior. He had worked at several professions before becoming a teacher at the same school as Jane, including as a whaler, co-owner of a plantation and as a doctor. According to family lore, Jane agreed to marry Robertson when he promised to travel with her back to Prairie du Chien and find her mother. However, he was also described as "handsome", "charming" and "a delight". They were married in 1836 and set off in July 1837.

The couple completed a "thrilling" journey across Lake Michigan and down the Fox River in a birch bark canoe. They looked for Grey Cloud Woman at Prairie du Chien, but learned she had remarried to Hazen Mooers and settled at a different trading post. They had a brief reunion with Angus, before finding Grey Cloud and the Mooers at Little Rock on the Minnesota River. Grey Cloud had not seen her daughter in more than 13 years.

== Little Rock ==
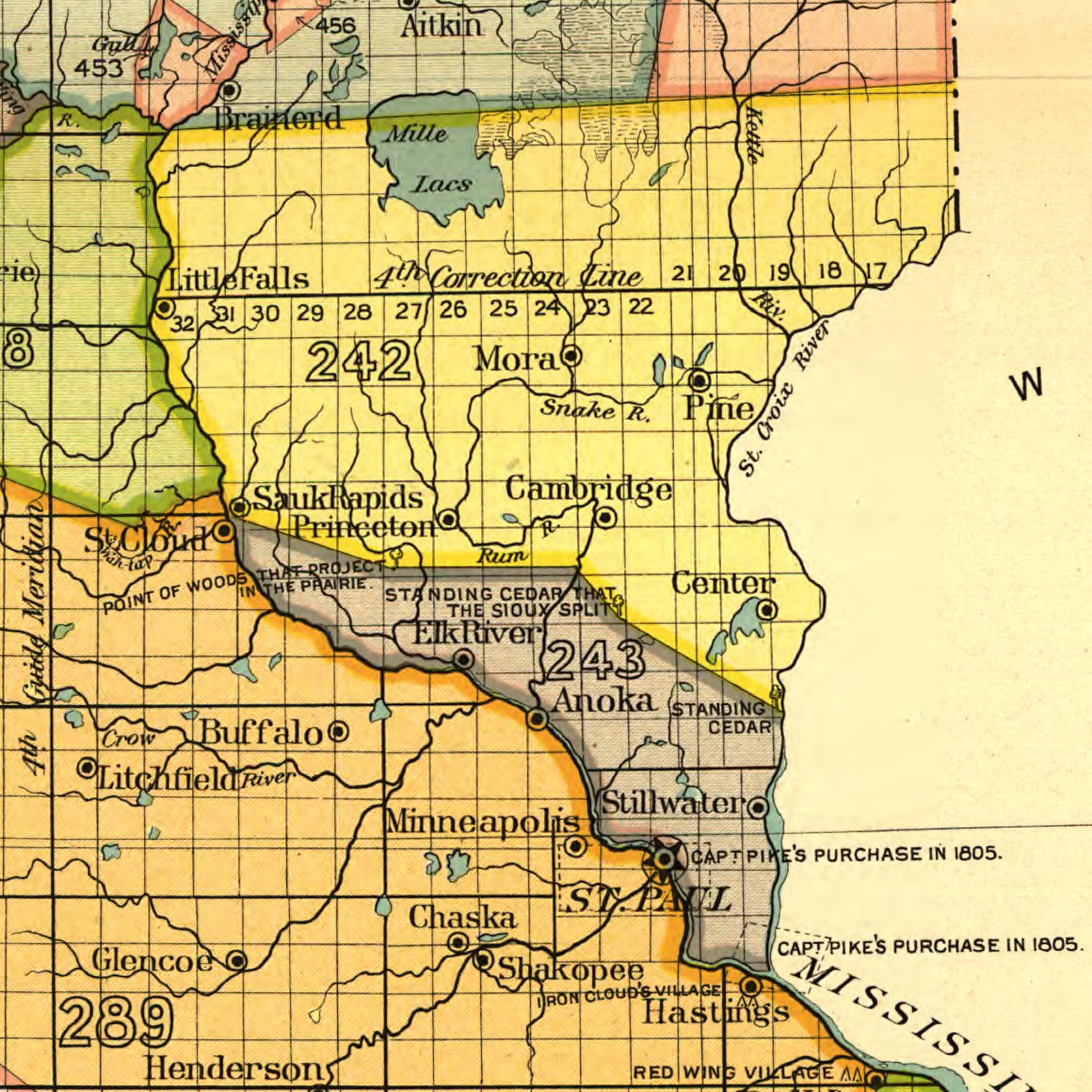
The Dakota ceded land east of the Mississippi River, including in the Treaty of 1837.

Mooers was a popular trader among the Dakota and was known for fair dealings. Around 1835, he was fired by his employers at American Fur for being too generous with credit to Native traders. Subsequently, he worked for himself as an independent trader, relying on kinship relations established through his wife. He and Grey Cloud moved to a location called Little Rock and began to establish a new trading post. A visitor described Grey Cloud at the time as "a middle-aged bustling woman". The family were living in tents and working to build a two-room house. The visitor noted that Mooers "appears to be fond" of his daughters and that the girls took after their mother. The post was not an economic success and was abandoned by the family in 1838. Grey Cloud's adult daughter, Jane, and new son-in-law, Andrew Robertson, arrived in 1837 and lived with the rest of the family at the trading post through the winter of 1837–1838.

== Treaty of 1837 ==
In 1837, the Mdewakanton Dakota lost 5 million acres of land east of the Mississippi River following the treaty, which promised annuity payments to tribal members in exchange. Grey Cloud Woman, her husband Hazen and two adult children, Angus Anderson and Jane Robertson were all signatories of an August, 1837 letter penned by trader Jean Baptiste Faribault to Henry Dodge, then governor of the territory. The issue, Faribault wrote, was in the way racially-mixed Dakota-European beneficiaries were described in the treaty. "Half-breeds", as they were termed in the treaty, were eligible for sums of money. He argued that many mixed-ancestry people had more complicated genealogies than a simple 50% split and urged a more expansive definition of eligibility through the use of the word "relations". This letter had an impact, in altering the wording of the final treaty, which specified that any person with at least one quarter Dakota ancestry would be eligible for the payments, a change which directly benefited Grey Cloud Woman's children, all five of whom were listed as "quarter-blood" in the final document of 1838.

The treaty had another immediately practical effect on the family. In 1838, recognizing that their Little Rock post was foundering, the family relocated to what is now known as Grey Cloud Island, situated on the Mississippi River. There is no record of its Dakota name prior to this point. The island, located 18 miles south of modern-day St Paul, Minnesota was five miles wide by two miles long. They settled at a recently abandoned site that already contained three lodges. These had, until recently, been the home of a Sioux band led by Medicine Bottle. The band left the location following the treaty, which allowed the Mooers and Robertson families to stake claims to the land.

== Life at Grey Cloud Island ==
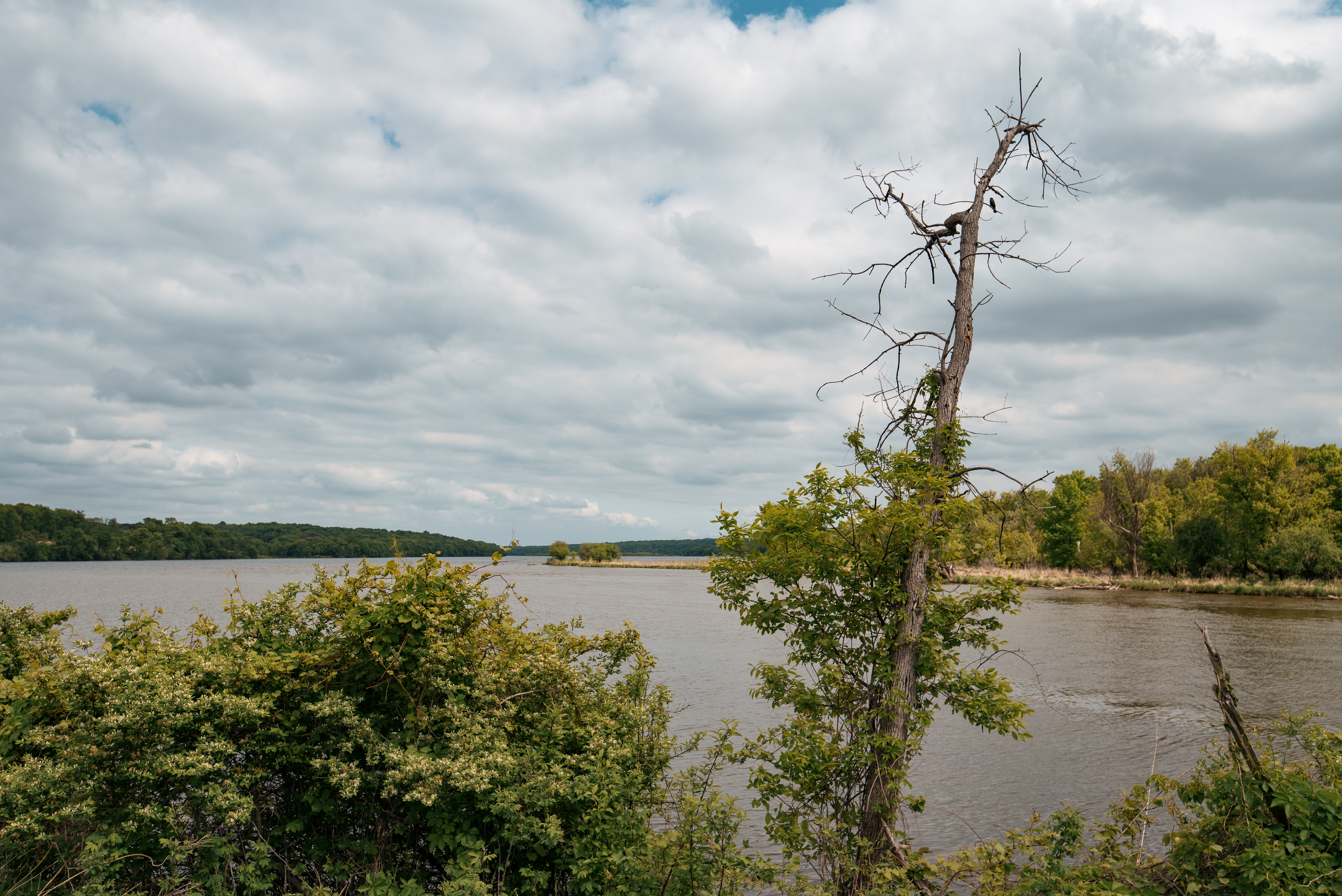
View of Mooers Lake from Hazen P Mooers Park on Grey Cloud Island, south and east of modern-day St Paul, Minnesota. Grey Cloud Woman, for whom the island is named, and her family made their home on the island from 1838 to 1847.

It was the spring of 1838 when the family arrived at Grey Cloud Island. It was a large family party, including Grey Cloud, her husband Hazen Mooers, their daughters, Grey Cloud Woman I (Grey Cloud's mother), and Jane and Andrew Robertson. They moved into two of the three willow and bark lodges that had recently been abandoned, using the third as a storeroom. A productive year followed, planting the first wheat crop on the island, growing corn and potatoes, raising livestock and producing dairy products, including butter. These efforts produced a surplus of food and cattle, which they were able to sell at Fort Snelling and to steamship traders bound for St. Louis, Missouri. By 1839, they had built two new log houses overlooking the Mississippi, each with three rooms. Grey Cloud and her family lived in one, while the Robertson family took the other. Grey Cloud's other son, Angus Anderson, did not live on the island, but came and went from the island while working at a trading post in Mendota. Andrew Robertson named the island after his mother-in-law, a designation that remains today.

Grey Cloud and her family were not the only new inhabitants to settle on the island that year. They were neighbors with Joseph Renshaw Brown and his wife, Susan Frenier Brown, a woman with an Anglo-Dakota heritage. The relationship between Grey Cloud, her family and the Browns during this period proved consequential to the long-term fortunes of Grey Cloud's descendants. Grey Cloud's son, Angus, became close friends with the Browns, who named their son Angus Mitchell Anderson Brown. Over the ensuing decades, four Brown family members would marry four of Grey Cloud's descendants. Jane Robertson would once again become neighbors with Joseph and Susan Brown in the late 1850s and maintained a close friendship with Susan. This long-standing friendship helped Jane Robertson's family survive following the death of her husband in 1859, when Brown, then Indian agent at Redwood Agency, appointed her as school superintendent so she could continue to support the family. Part of the Brown's extended household on the island included Susan's mother, Winona Crawford, her husband Akipa, and her son from a previous marriage, Gabriel Renville. Other neighbors included an Englishman named James Clewett, Marcelle Courturier, Joseph Bourcier, and husband and wife Pierre Felix and Rosalie Frenier.

Grey Cloud and her family saw a series of births and deaths while living on the island in the early 1840s. In 1839, a second son, Thomas Anderson Robertson was born to the couple on the island. In 1840, Angus Anderson, who had recently gone into business with his step-father, died of fever while traveling to St. Louis on business. Jane Robertson bore a daughter, Marion, that fall, and a son, who she named Angus for her brother, in 1842. In 1841, James Wabasha Robertson, the first-born son of Jane and Andrew Robertson and Grey Cloud's first grandson, died at the age of three. Grey Cloud Woman I, Grey Cloud's mother, died in 1844 at Black Dog's Village.

Later in 1844, Grey Cloud's daughter Jane moved with her growing family off the island to a nearby location on the Mississippi river called Cave Spring. Grey Cloud, Hazen and their daughters remained on the island a few more years. On January 1, 1846, Mary Mooers, Grey Cloud and Hazen Mooers' eldest daughter and the first of Grey Cloud's immediate family to become part of the Brown family, married John Wesley Brown, a half brother of their neighbor, Joseph Brown, on the island. Shortly after, the young couple moved to Black Dog's village, close to the Bdote. Hazen and Grey Cloud moved off the island in 1846. They lived for a year in Shakopee's village, where Hazen built a house. A year later, they moved with their two younger daughters, Jane Anne and Madeline, near their daughter, Mary Brown. Hazen took work as a government farmer.

== Death and legacy ==
Grey Cloud Woman died at Hohaanskae located between the Minnesota River and Black Dog Lake, in 1850. The cause of her death is unknown and she was about 56 years old. All four of her daughters were with her when she died. Later, in 1858, Thomas Robertson would recount a story about his grandmother: Robertson was tasked with negotiating with some upset Native American men. After mentioning his grandmother's name, negotiations immediately smoothed. The men remembered Grey Cloud Woman, as she had "fed many of them the winter of the great famine when so many of them starved to death getting back from their winter hunt.”
