= Thomas Gummersall Anderson =

- Born: November 12, 1779; Sorel, Province of Quebec
- Died: February 10, 1875 (aged 95); Port Hope, Ontario
- Title: Visiting Superintendent of the Indian Department
- Spouse: Elizabeth Ann Hamilton
- Children: Gustavus Alexander

Thomas Gummersall Anderson (1779–1875) was a fur trader, soldier, and prominent employee in the British Indian Department.

== Family background and early life ==
Thomas Gummersall Anderson was born in 1779 to a loyalist family who had taken refuge in the Province of Quebec following the outbreak of the American Revolution. In 1783 the Anderson family moved to New Johnstown, known today as Cornwall.

== Early Career in the fur trade ==
In 1795, Anderson was apprenticed to the merchant Thomas Markland. At the behest of Markland's half-brother Robert Mackenzie, Anderson was sent to the post of Michilimackinac in 1800 to participate in the fur trade. He spent the next 14 years trading for furs, mostly west of Lake Michigan.

In around 1805 he married Grey Cloud Woman or Margaret Aird, a Scottish-Dakota woman. They had two children, but separated when Anderson moved to Canada after the War of 1812 and his wife refused to leave her home area.

== War of 1812 ==
With the outbreak of the War of 1812, Anderson left his fur trading career and volunteered to serve with the British forces. He was involved in the capture of Prairie du Chien in the summer of 1814.

== Employment in the Indian Department ==
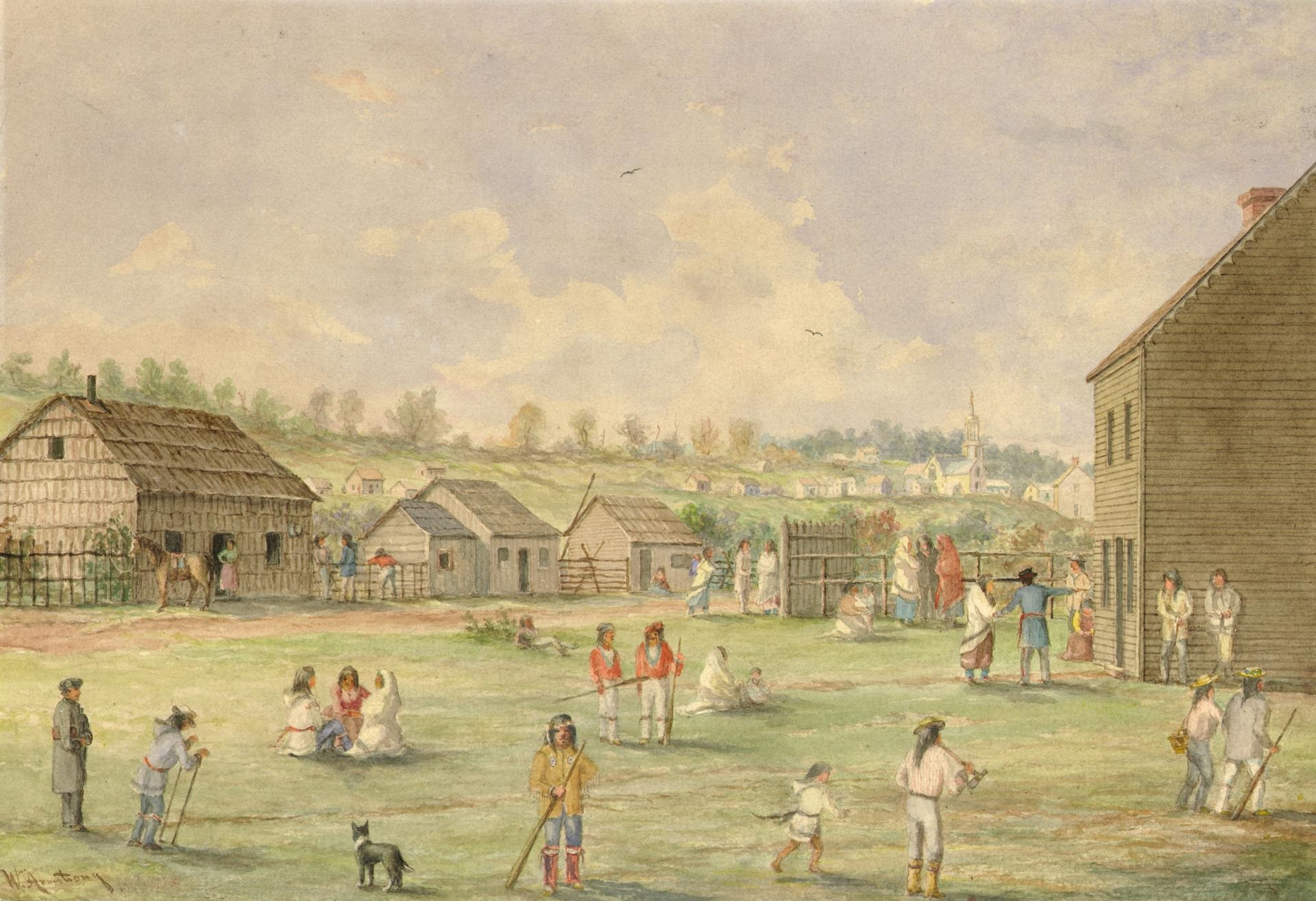
The Anishinaabe village at Wikwemikong on Manitoulin Island in 1856

After the War of 1812, Anderson was employed in the British Indian Department beginning in 1815. It was during this time that he struck up a long term friendship with the prominent Odawa leader Jean-Baptiste Assiginack. In 1820 he married Elizabeth Ann Hamilton, the granddaughter of prominent Anishinaabekwe Elizabeth Bertrand and Indian Department surgeon David Mitchell.

Anderson retired from the department in 1858. He died in 1875.
