= Christopher Connor =

Sherwin-Williams Company executive

- Citizenship: United States
- Education: Ohio State University
- Occupation: Business executive
- Employer: Sherwin-Williams Company

Christopher M. Connor is the executive chairman of the Sherwin-Williams Company, a Fortune 500 company in the general building materials industry. He joined the company in 1983, became the CEO in October 1999 and the chairman in April 2000, and was the president from July 2005 to October 2006. In 2009, he was one of the 200 highest-paid CEOs in the United States, receiving a salary of $1,268,986 and total compensation of $7,495,810.

Connor is on the board of directors of Sherwin-Williams, the Greater Cleveland Partnership, Rock and Roll Hall of Fame, the United Way Services of Greater Cleveland, the Playhouse Square Foundation, and Eaton Corporation; and is a member of the dean's advisory committee of the Fisher College of Business at Ohio State University. He is also on the boards of the National Association of Manufacturers and the American Coatings Association; was on the board of directors of Diebold and National City Corporation; and was chairman of the boards of Walsh Jesuit High School, Keep America Beautiful, and University Hospitals Health System.

Born in Pensacola, Florida to a business-executive father and a stay-at-home mother, he grew up in Akron, Ohio, and graduated from Walsh Jesuit High School in 1974, and from Ohio State University in 1978, where he majored in sociology. After graduation, he worked at an advertising agency and at the Glidden paint company, then became an advertising director at Sherwin Williams. He said, "Joining Sherwin-Williams was the single best decision, other than asking my wife to marry me, that I've ever made, culminating in a 25-year career here." He has two sisters and is married with three children. When in September 2005 his high school launched a "For the Greater Glory of God" campaign to mark its 40th anniversary, he donated $1 million to the campaign and gave a speech at its celebration. He is a member of the general chairs of the campaign.
