= Twins Days =

Gathering of twins in Twinsburg, Ohio

Coordinates: 41.32°N 81.46°W

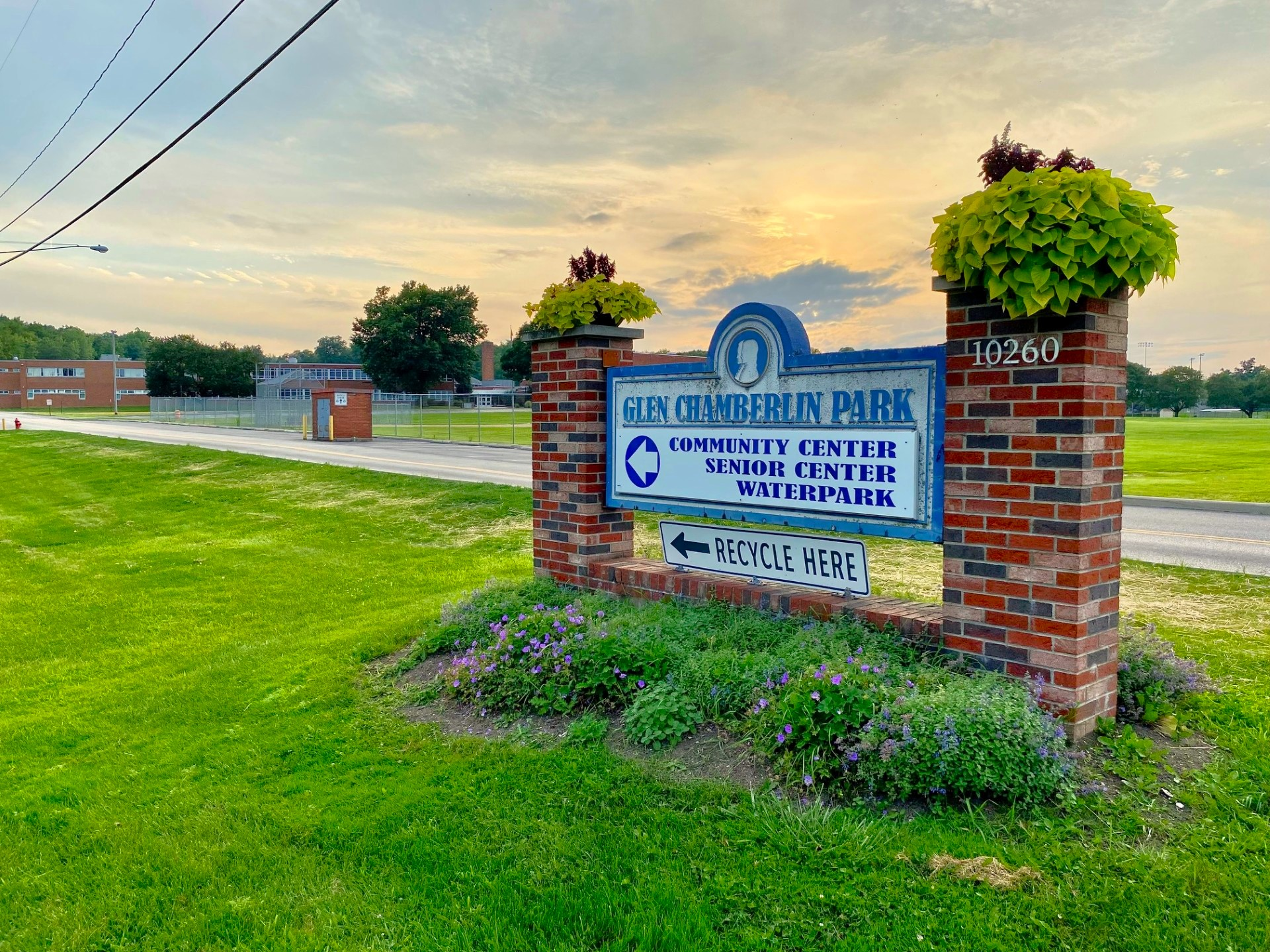
- Twins Days Festival Site Location
- Status: active
- Frequency: Annually
- Venue: Glen Chamberlin Park
- Location: Twinsburg, Ohio
- Country: United States
- Years active: 49–50
- Inaugurated: 1976
- Website: twinsdays.org

Twins Days is held annually on the first full weekend in August in Twinsburg, Ohio, United States to celebrate biological twins (and other multiples, e.g., triplets, quads). The event has taken place every summer since 1976 when the festival was founded by a group of Twinsburg citizens, based on a concept developed by Ray Diersing, Sage Hiller, and Ari Hiller. The first time Twins Day was proposed to the city council, it was rejected since the city council thought it was a bad idea. It is the largest annual gathering of twins in the world, and draws thousands of participants from all over the United States and elsewhere in the world.

The event routinely attracts about 2,000 pairs of twins. About 1,140 sets of multiples were pre-registered for the 2014 festival, including people from Nigeria, Brazil, Australia, Ghana, Canada, Ireland, New Zealand, France, Italy, England, Belgium, Germany, Japan, China, and India. The 2014 festival was themed as a "peace and love" event, and billed as "Twinstock: Groovy in Twinsburg".

The festival has developed its own traditions over the years. As the writer Tony Barrell noted in a major press article in 2003, “An unwritten festival rule means that identical twins are identically dressed, too. This applies as much to 70-year-old men as to 17-year-old girls and to tiny babies, wheeled around in fleets of twin buggies.” The festival is opened every year with a performance of The Star-Spangled Banner, sung by John and Jerry Starlet and signed in ASL by Jamie Maassen and Jodie Qualkinbush, and a parade along Ravenna Road (former SR-14).

The festival attracts many members of the scientific community, who use the presence of thousands of identical and fraternal twins to conduct voluntary twin studies, to determine the genetic or non-genetic basis of a wide range of human traits. Twins are customarily rewarded for their participation.

== History ==
The Twins Days event was inspired by a pair of enterprising 19th-century twins, Moses and Aaron Wilcox. “They were the identical twins who bought about 4,000 acres of land here in 1819 and then offered to donate six acres for a town square and $20 towards a new school, on one condition: that the place drop its dull old name, Millsville, and become Twinsburg. More than a century and a half later, in 1976, the town was celebrating the United States’ bicentennial and decided to throw a party the Wilcoxes would have appreciated. Just 36 pairs of twins showed up, but the burghers of Twinsburg saw its potential and made it annual.”

There was no festival in 2020 due to the COVID-19 pandemic. However, The Twins Days Festival did hold a virtual festival that year, with virtual events such as a 5k Race, streaming replay of the previous year's parade, virtual group photo, streaming bingo games, etc. Because of the full "virtual" schedule, the organization considers a 2020 festival having taken place, but just not an in-person one.
