= Grey Cloud Island Township, Washington County, Minnesota =

Grey Cloud Island Township, Minnesota
- Township
- Location within the state of Minnesota Grey Cloud Island Township, Minnesota (the United States)
- Coordinates: 44°48′31″N 92°59′40″W
- Country: United States
- State: Minnesota
- County: Washington

Area
  - Total: 3.9 sq mi (10.0 km^{2})
  - Land: 3.1 sq mi (8.1 km^{2})
  - Water: 0.73 sq mi (1.9 km^{2})
- Elevation: 715 ft (218 m)

Population (2020)
  - Total: 283
  - Density: 90/sq mi (35/km^{2})
- Time zone: UTC-6 (Central (CST))
  - Summer (DST): UTC-5 (CDT)
- ZIP code: 55071
- Area code: 651
- FIPS code: 27-25982
- GNIS feature ID: 0664354

Grey Cloud Island Township is a township in Washington County, Minnesota, United States. The population was 283 at the 2020 census. The township formerly included all of Lower Grey Cloud Island but that area has been annexed by the neighboring city of Cottage Grove. Since then the township has been made up of Upper Grey Cloud Island, an area to the north bounded by Grey Cloud Trail and Geneva Avenue, and a small piece of Lower Grey Cloud Island.

== History ==
=== Name ===
Grey Cloud Island is named after Grey Cloud Woman, who lived on the island from 1838 to 1847.

== Geography ==
According to the United States Census Bureau, the township has a total area of 3.9 square miles (10 km^{2}), of which 3.1 square miles (8.0 km^{2}) is land and 0.7 square miles (1.8 km^{2}) (18.91%) is water. County 75 serves as a main route in the township.

== Demographics ==
At the 2010 census there were 307 people, 117 households, and 76 families in the township. The population density was 98.2 inhabitants per square mile (37.9/km^{2}). There were 123 housing units at an average density of 39.3 per square mile (15.2/km^{2}). The racial makeup of the township was 97.39% White, 0.33% African American, 0.33% Native American, 0.98% from other races, and 0.98% from two or more races. Hispanic or Latino of any race were 1.63%.

Of the 117 households, 25.6% had children under the age of 18 living with them, 57.3% were married couples living together, 3.4% had a female householder with no husband present, and 35.0% were non-families. 23.1% of households were one person, and 10.3% were one person aged 65 or older. The average household size was 2.62 and the average family size was 3.07.

In the township the population was spread out, with 22.1% under the age of 18, 7.8% from 18 to 24, 28.3% from 25 to 44, 27.4% from 45 to 64, and 14.3% 65 or older. The median age was 40 years. For every 100 females, there were 113.2 males. For every 100 females age 18 and over, there were 107.8 males.

The median household income was $55,714 and the median family income was $65,000. Males had a median income of $48,125 versus $26,528 for females. The per capita income for the township was $26,150. None of the families and 7.2% of the population were living below the poverty line.

== Cultural references ==
In the 50 States of Fright three-episode story "Grey Cloud Island (Minnesota)", four pledges (Asa Butterfield, Dan Ginnane, Drew Ray Tanner and Alex Fitzalan) are ready and eager to find out if they're Kappa material. But this initiation ritual is about to get way darker than they expected when they discover a chained victim deep in the woods.
