= Tommy Andersson =

Tommy Andersson may refer to:

- Tommy Andersson (actor) (1962–2013), Swedish actor
- Tommy Andersson (footballer, born 1950), Swedish footballer
- Tommy Andersson (footballer, born 1964), Swedish footballer
- Tommy Andersson (Djurgårdens IF Fotboll footballer), Swedish footballer
- B. Tommy Andersson (born 1964), Swedish conductor and composer
