= Thomas Anderson (musician) =

American rock singer-songwriter

- Born: Oklahoma
- Origin: Austin, Texas
- Genres: Rock music
- Years active: 1989–present
- Labels: Out There, Blue Million Miles, Red River, Dutch East India Trading

Thomas Anderson is an American singer-songwriter.

== Early life ==
Anderson was born in Miami, Oklahoma. He graduated from Oklahoma State University–Stillwater in 1981 with an English degree.

== Musical career ==
Anderson recorded his debut album, Alright, It was Frank... and He's Risen From the Dead and Gone Off With His Truck, in Norman, Oklahoma in the late 1980s. The album was released in 1989, originally on vinyl on the Out There label. He moved to Austin, Texas in 1992 but returned to Oklahoma some years later. In 1993, Alright, It Was Frank... was re-released on CD by the Dutch East India Trading label.

His second album, Blues for the Flying Dutchman, was originally released by a small German label before being picked up by Dutch East India. His third album, Moon Going Down, was released on the Marilyn label, which has been described as "slightly higher profile" than the labels he released his previous albums on. In 1998, he released Bolide, a seven-track mini-album, on Red River Records. In 2003, Anderson released another album, Norman, Oklahoma, also on Red River Records. In 2012, he released The Moon in Transit, a collection of 12 four-track recordings of previously unreleased songs taken from his 13-year archives, on the Out There label. He followed this the following year with another compilation album drawn from these archives, titled On Becoming Human.

== Reception ==
In 1996, Tulsa World wrote that Anderson was "one of the most critically lauded yet efficiently obscure songwriters of the last decade." Rolling Stone reviewed "Blues for the Flying Dutchman" favorably, giving it three and a half stars. The magazine said that the album "should find a place with everyone who believes that rock 'n' roll can still reflect and interpret the world in an original way - from the margins." Robert Christgau has also given Anderson's albums multiple A grades.

== Discography ==
- Alright, It was Frank... and He's Risen From the Dead and Gone Off With His Truck (Out There, 1989)
- Blues for the Flying Dutchman (Blue Million Miles, 1993)
- Moon Going Down (Marilyn, 1995)
- Bolide (Red River, 1998)
- Norman, Oklahoma (Red River, 2003)
- The Moon in Transit (Out There compilation, 2012)
- On Becoming Human (Out There compilation, 2013)
- Heaven (Out There, 2016)
- My Songs Are the House I Live In (Out There, 2017)
- Beyond That Point (2018)
- Analog Summer (2020)
- Ladies And Germs (2021)
- Hello, I'm From The Future (2024)
- Letters From The Hermit Kingdom (2026)
