= Twinsburg, Ohio =

- City
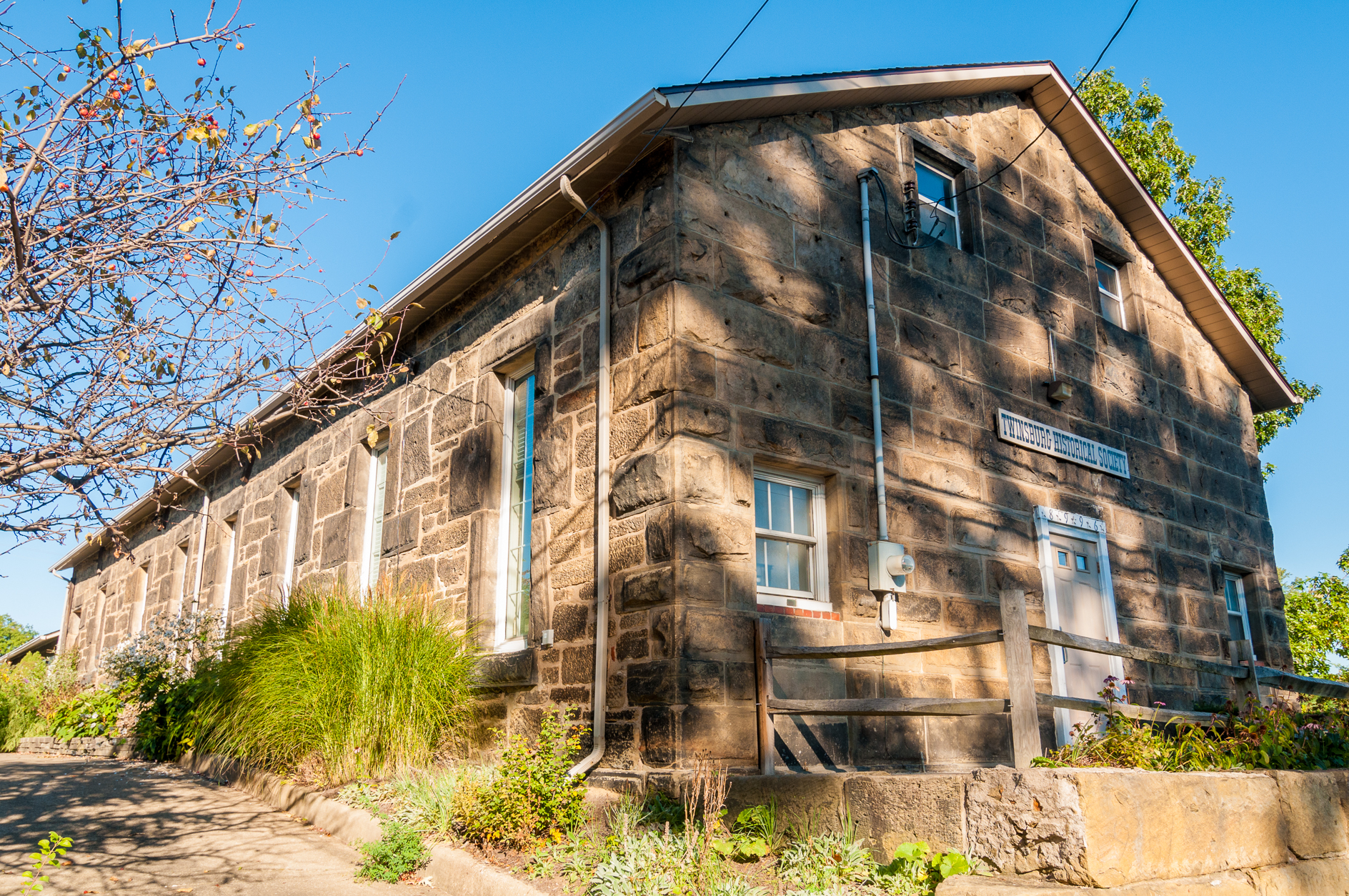
- Former Twinsburg Institute
- Interactive map of Twinsburg, Ohio
- Location within Ohio Location within the United States
- Coordinates: 41°19′19″N 81°26′42″W
- Country: United States
- State: Ohio
- County: Summit

Government
  - Mayor: Sam Scaffide

Area
  - Total: 13.79 sq mi (35.72 km^{2})
  - Land: 13.76 sq mi (35.63 km^{2})
  - Water: 0.035 sq mi (0.09 km^{2})
- Elevation: 974 ft (297 m)

Population (2020)
  - Total: 19,248
  - Density: 1,399.0/sq mi (540.14/km^{2})
- Time zone: UTC-5 (Eastern (EST))
  - Summer (DST): UTC-4 (EDT)
- ZIP code: 44087
- Area code: 330
- FIPS code: 39-78050
- GNIS feature ID: 1087020
- Website: https://www.mytwinsburg.com/

Twinsburg is a suburban city in Summit County, Ohio, United States, located midway between Akron and Cleveland. The population was 19,248 as of the 2020 census. It is part of the Akron metropolitan area.

== History ==
The first person to settle Millsville was sixteen year-old Ethan Alling, who in 1817 moved to Township Five in the tenth range of the Connecticut Land Company. The next year, identical twins Moses and Aaron Wilcox began selling discounted parcels of land and announced they would donate 6 acres of land to the community and donate money to fund a school should the locals rename the settlement "Twinsburg." The Twinsburg Post Office was established in 1825 and was run by Ethan Alling. In addition to his duties as postmaster, Alling later would become the town's "stagecoach operator, merchant and hotel proprietor".

The Twinsburg Historical Society was founded in 1963. They run a museum which houses historical documents and artefacts used by early settlers. The Mail Pouch Tobacco sign displayed on the barn was one of the last ones painted by the famous barn painter Harley Warrick.

== Geography ==
According to the United States Census Bureau, the city has a total area of 32.3 km² (12.5 mi²). 32.2 km^{2} (12.4 mi^{2}) of it is land and 0.1 km^{2} (0.04 mi^{2}) of it (0.24%) is water.

== Demographics ==
Historical population
Census	Pop.	Note	%±
1880	201		—
1930	1,240		—
1940	1,747		40.9%
1950	2,689		53.9%
1960	4,098		52.4%
1970	6,432		57.0%
1980	7,627		18.6%
1990	9,606		25.9%
2000	17,006		77.0%
2010	18,795		10.5%
2020	19,248		2.4%
2025 (est.)	18,939		−1.6%

=== 2020 census ===
As of the 2020 census, Twinsburg had a population of 19,248. The median age was 45.9 years. 20.8% of residents were under the age of 18 and 21.1% of residents were 65 years of age or older. For every 100 females, there were 89.8 males, and for every 100 females age 18 and over there were 84.8 males age 18 and over.

99.8% of residents lived in urban areas, while 0.2% lived in rural areas.

There were 7,755 households in Twinsburg, of which 29.4% had children under the age of 18 living in them. Of all households, 54.2% were married-couple households, 13.5% were households with a male householder and no spouse or partner present, and 27.9% were households with a female householder and no spouse or partner present. About 28.7% of all households were made up of individuals and 15.2% had someone living alone who was 65 years of age or older.

There were 8,104 housing units, of which 4.3% were vacant. The homeowner vacancy rate was 0.7% and the rental vacancy rate was 7.4%.

Racial composition as of the 2020 census
Race	Number	Percent
White	13,707	71.2%
Black or African American	3,160	16.4%
American Indian and Alaska Native	13	0.1%
Asian	1,323	6.9%
Native Hawaiian and Other Pacific Islander	6	0.0%
Some other race	133	0.7%
Two or more races	906	4.7%
Hispanic or Latino (of any race)	414	2.2%

=== 2010 census ===
As of the census of 2010, there were 18,795 people, 7,507 households, and 5,124 families residing in the city. The population density was 1,364.9 inhabitants per square mile (527.0/km^{2}). There were 7,898 housing units at an average density of 573.6 per square mile (221.5/km^{2}). The racial makeup of the city was 78.5% White, 13.4% African American, 0.1% Native American, 5.7% Asian, 0.3% from other races, and 1.9% from two or more races. Hispanic or Latino of any race were 1.2% of the population.

There were 7,507 households, of which 35.5% had children under the age of 18 living with them, 56.9% were married couples living together, 8.9% had a female householder with no husband present, 2.5% had a male householder with no wife present, and 31.7% were non-families. 27.8% of all households were made up of individuals, and 12.1% had someone living alone who was 65 years of age or older. The average household size was 2.49 and the average family size was 3.09.

The median age in the city was 41.4 years. 25.4% of residents were under the age of 18; 5.7% were between the ages of 18 and 24; 24.8% were from 25 to 44; 29.4% were from 45 to 64; and 14.5% were 65 years of age or older. The gender makeup of the city was 46.8% male and 53.2% female.

Of the city's population over the age of 25, 44.1% holds a bachelor's degree or higher.

=== 2000 census ===
As of the census of 2000, there were 17,006 people, 6,641 households, and 4,695 families residing in the city. The population density was 1,366.7 inhabitants per square mile (527.7/km^{2}). There were 6,871 housing units at an average density of 552.2 per square mile (213.2/km^{2}). The racial makeup of the city was 86.93% White, 8.73% African American, 0.11% Native American, 2.95% Asian, 0.01% Pacific Islander, 0.31% from other races, and 0.96% from two or more races. Hispanic or Latino of any race were 1.03% of the population.

There were 6,641 households, out of which 35.5% had children under the age of 18 living with them, 60.7% were married couples living together, 7.7% had a female householder with no husband present, and 29.3% were non-families. 24.9% of all households were made up of individuals, and 8.6% had someone living alone who was 65 years of age or older. The average household size was 2.54 and the average family size was 3.08.

In the city the population was spread out, with 26.7% under the age of 18, 5.1% from 18 to 24, 35.5% from 25 to 44, 21.6% from 45 to 64, and 11.2% who were 65 years of age or older. The median age was 36 years. For every 100 females, there were 92.0 males. For every 100 females age 18 and over, there were 88.2 males.

== Culture ==
Twinsburg holds a yearly festival for twins, and other multiple births, called Twins Days. The festival started in 1976 and has grown to be the world's largest annual gathering of twins, with around 3,000 sets attending annually. The festival attracts twins, multiples, and their families from much of the world, with many sets returning year after year.

== Government ==
Mayor	Years in office		Notes
Mayor	First	Last	
Anthony Perici	1979	1987	First full-time mayor
James Karabec	1987	1999	
Katherine Procop	1999	2015	
Ted Yates	2015	2022	
Sam Scaffide	2022		

== Education ==
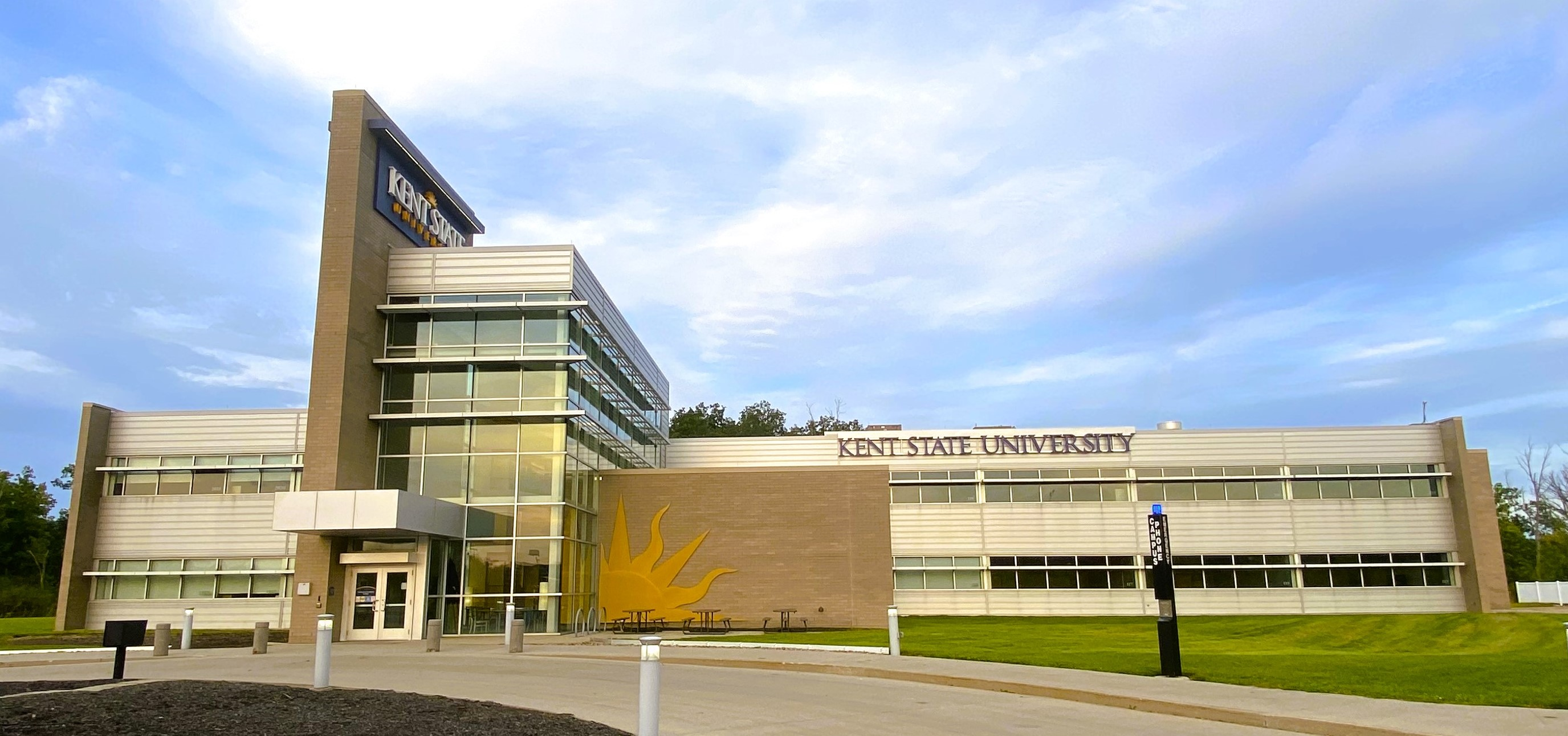
Kent State University Twinsburg Academic Center

The Twinsburg City School District is composed of five schools, 4,069 students, 234 classified staff, and 272 certified staff. The schools have received the "Excellent with Distinction" rating for the Ohio state tests for the 2010–11 school year. Schools in the city are as follows:

- Wilcox Primary: Grades PK–1
- Bissell Elementary School: Grades 2–3 and in 2016 Bissell Won the National Blue Ribbon school
- Dodge Intermediate School: Grades 4–6
- R. B. Chamberlin Middle School: Grades 7–8
- Twinsburg High School: Grades 9–12

According to the Twinsburg City Schools, The "Old School" located on Darrow Road was the only school building in Twinsburg until 1957, and was closed as a public school in 1992. The Twinsburg campus of Kent State Geauga occupied the "Old School" building until building a new facility in 2012. Supporters of the "Old School" have tried to have the building placed on the National Register of Historic Places, to prevent it from being torn down for redevelopment. The building has since been torn down. As of 2024, a vacant lot stands where the school once did.

Twinsburg is served by the Twinsburg Public Library.

== Notable people ==
- Ethan Alling (1800–1868), Founder of Twinsburg
- Samuel Bissell (1797–1895), Founder of Twinsburg Institute
- Howie Chizek, radio personality, public address announcer, and philanthropist
- Scott Effross (born 1993), baseball pitcher for the New York Yankees
- Kelly Herndon, retired NFL player for the Denver Broncos, Seattle Seahawks, and Tennessee Titans
- Joe Madsen, football player.
- Julia E. McConaughy (1834–1885), litterateur and author.
- Dorothy Runk Mennen, theatre professor.
- Dan Miller, member of the boy band O-Town.
- Zoltan Mesko, retired NFL player for the New England Patriots, Pittsburgh Steelers, and Cincinnati Bengals.
- Kevin O'Neill, former NFL player.
- James Posey, retired NBA player for seven teams and former assistant coach for the Cleveland Cavaliers.
- Brad Stuver (born 1991), MLS goalkeeper for the Austin FC
