= Thomas Anderson (footballer, born 1916) =

English footballer (born 1916)

Personal information
- Date of birth: 1916
- Place of birth: Gateshead, England
- Position: Goalkeeper

Senior career*
Years	Team	Apps	(Gls)
1938–1939	Grimsby Town	1	(0)
- * Club domestic league appearances and goals

Thomas Anderson (born 1916) was an English professional footballer who played as a goalkeeper.
