= Terry Anderson =

Terry Anderson may refer to:

- Terry Anderson (American football) (born 1955), American former NFL player
- Terry Anderson (footballer) (1944–1980), English association footballer
- Terry Anderson (musician) (born 1956), American musician
- Terry A. Anderson (1947–2024) American journalist and former hostage
- Terry L. Anderson (born 1946), American free market environmentalist
- Terry R. Anderson (?–1966), American FBI agent who was killed during the kidnapping of Peggy Ann Bradnick
- Terence Anderson (sport shooter) (born c. 1946), Australian-born American sports shooter
- Terry Anderson, Canadian candidate in 2008
