= Thomas Anderson (English footballer) =

English footballer

Personal information
- Position: Inside left

Senior career*
Years	Team	Apps	(Gls)
1903	Blackpool	2	(0)
- * Club domestic league appearances and goals

Thomas Anderson was an English footballer. His only known club was Blackpool, for whom he made two Football League appearances in 1903.
