= Tom Anderson (trade unionist) =

New Zealand seaman and trade unionist

Thomas Frederick Anderson (30 December 1888 – 22 September 1964) was a New Zealand seaman and trade unionist. He was born in Liverpool, Lancashire, England on 30 December 1888.
