= Twinsburg Institute =

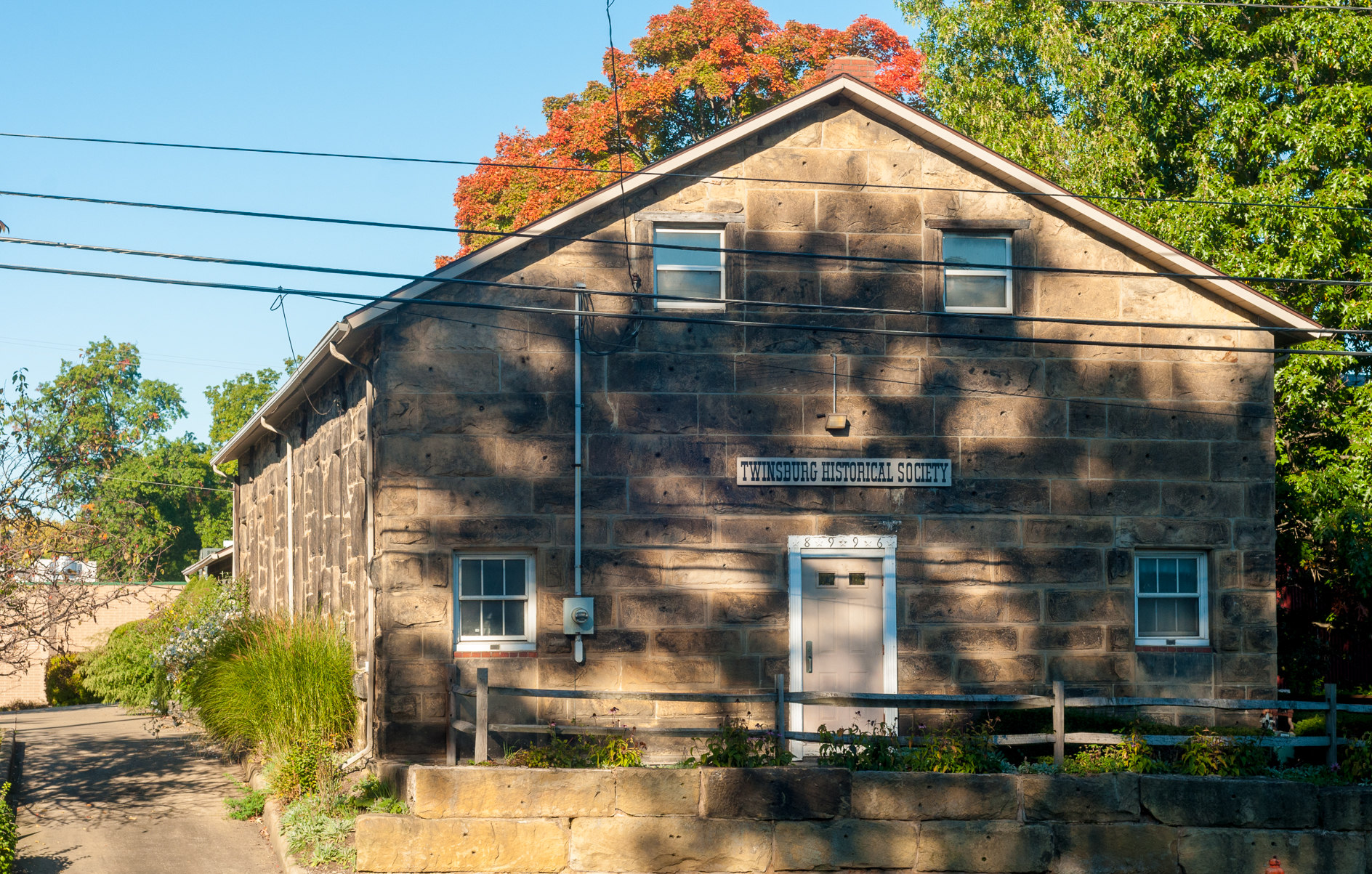
- The historic stone building of the Twinsburg Institute, c. 2014.

Location
- 8996 Darrow Road; 8996 Darrow Rd, Twinsburg, OH 44087; Twinsburg, Ohio 44087; United States; 41.310507118°N 81.440410779°W

Information
- Type: Private Academy (historical)
- Established: 1865
- Founder: Rev. Samuel Bissell
- Status: National Register of Historic Places
- Closed: 1895
- Director: Rev. Samuel Bissell
- Enrollment: ~6,000 students educated over its history

Twinsburg Institute (formerly named Bissell Institute) was a historic private academy located in Twinsburg, Ohio, United States. Established and constructed primarily by the noted local educator Reverend Samuel Bissell in 1865, the Institute served as a vital educational institution during the latter half of the 19th century, drawing students from across Summit County and the wider Northeast Ohio region. Bissell operated the school as its administrator, director, and primary instructor throughout its entire 31-year run, until his death at the advanced age of 98 in 1895, at which point the school closed its doors permanently.

The Institute became highly regarded for its distinctive, heavy sandstone architecture and, more significantly, for Bissell’s inclusive educational philosophy. This model allowed students from diverse economic backgrounds to attend and receive quality instruction without regard to their ability to pay tuition, a rare philanthropic feature for a private academy of that era. Over its three decades of operation, the Institute educated an estimated 6,000 students, significantly impacting the educational and social landscape of the region. The historic building survives today and is recognized nationally for its historical significance, protected with a listing on the National Register of Historic Places (NRHP).

== History and founding ==
The origins of the Twinsburg Institute are closely tied to the founding of the town. The Wilcox twins, Moses and Aaron, stipulated in their original land donation that a portion of the land and resources be specifically dedicated to establishing a local school, setting a strong precedent for the community’s commitment to academic development. Reverend Samuel Bissell, a veteran educator who had previously taught at other regional institutions, recognized the need for an institution offering more advanced and permanent instruction than the existing one-room schoolhouses, and began planning the Institute as early as the 1850s.

Bissell began construction of the Institute in 1865, shortly after the close of the Civil War. His personal involvement in the construction was widely documented; historical accounts suggest he undertook a significant portion of the manual labor himself, noting that he was instrumental in the physical erection of the building using thick-cut stone. The building's materials came from a locally quarried sandstone source, giving the structure its distinctive, durable, and monumental architectural identity, typical of regional institutions built to endure. The Institute quickly became the most prominent educational landmark in the county.

The school's most notable characteristic was its philanthropic operation. Bissell's policy of accepting students regardless of their ability to pay tuition meant the school functioned almost as a precursor to free public secondary education for many poor families in the region, including adults seeking to further their education. This inclusiveness was a major factor in the high enrollment figures, drawing students who would otherwise have lacked access to a classical secondary education, contributing to the education of over 6,000 individuals.

== Curriculum and academics ==
The Institute provided a classical curriculum which was the academic standard for 19th-century American academies, aimed at rigorously preparing students either for professional careers (such as teaching, ministry, or commerce) or for matriculation into major universities like Western Reserve College. The academic structure was comprehensive and challenging, reflecting the deep intellectual and moral interests of Director Bissell.

Core subjects emphasized included:

- Classical Languages: Advanced study in Latin and Greek was mandatory for many students intending to pursue higher education, a key feature distinguishing the academy from public schools.
- Mathematics and Natural Philosophy: Courses included advanced algebra, geometry, and early science (known as natural philosophy), often integrating practical and hands-on demonstrations.
- Rhetoric and Public Speaking: This instruction was deemed essential for civic engagement, legal careers, and professional success, forming a key component of the school's mission to create community leaders.
- Moral Philosophy and Ethics: Reflecting Bissell's background as a minister, moral philosophy and ethics were integrated throughout the course of study, shaping the character development of the students.
- Teacher Training: A significant number of students enrolled specifically to gain the necessary instruction and certification to become common school teachers themselves, making the Institute a regional center for educational development.

Alumni of the Institute often went on to become influential teachers, civic leaders, and professionals throughout Summit County and beyond.

== Architecture and structural changes ==
The architecture of the Twinsburg Institute is characterized by its heavy, durable stone construction, utilizing locally quarried, rough-cut stone blocks, often identified as a robust example of 19th-century vernacular architecture. The original structure, as completed by Reverend Bissell, was designed and constructed as a distinctive two-story building with a steep pitched roof, providing ample space for classrooms and administrative functions.

However, the immense weight of the sandstone used in its construction, combined with the structural limitations common to mid-19th-century building techniques, eventually led to significant structural settling and instability over time. This settling necessitated remedial action to prevent a collapse. Consequently, the entire second story was methodically removed at some point prior to 1917 to stabilize the structure, leaving the building in its present single-story configuration. This alteration is a significant part of the building's historical narrative and explains its unusually heavy appearance for a single-story structure.

== Closure and aftermath ==
The long and continuous tenure of Reverend Samuel Bissell as the director and driving force of the Institute ended with his death in 1895. As the school was largely dependent on his personal dedication and philanthropic efforts, the Institute 'closed permanently upon his passing. The closure coincided with the increasing establishment of publicly funded high schools in the region, which diminished the need for private academies offering basic secondary education.

The building remained a local landmark but stood vacant for over two decades. In 1917, the building was purchased by the local chapter of The Grange, a fraternal organization focused on agricultural community welfare. The Grange utilized the structure as its primary community meeting hall for several decades, preserving the original stone shell of the building.

Today, the historic structure is owned and operated by the Twinsburg Historical Society. It serves as the Society's museum and headquarters, housing artifacts and records related to the town's history, including those of Reverend Bissell and the Institute itself. The building's National Register of Historic Places listing ensures its continued preservation as one of Twinsburg's oldest and most significant structures.
