= Samuel Bissell =

Paster, Minister, and Founder of Twinsburg Institute (1797-1895)

Reverend Samuel Bissell
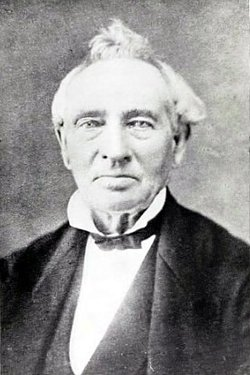
- Bissell Portrait, c. 1870–1895
- Born: April 28, 1797; Middlefield, Hampshire County, Massachusetts, U.S.
- Died: August 26, 1895 (aged 98); Twinsburg, Ohio, U.S.
- Resting place: Locust Grove Cemetery, Twinsburg, Ohio, U.S.
- Education: Yale College (Class of 1823)
- Occupations: Minister (1828–1895); Educator (1865–1895); Philanthropist (1865–1895): Paster (1828–1843)
- Known for: Founder and Director of Twinsburg Institute
- Title: Director of Twinsburg Institute
- Term: 1865 – 1895
- Predecessor: Office Established
- Successor: Office Abolished
- Spouse: Fanny P. Gaylord (1824–1860) Cynthia Amelia Sikes (1860–1895)

Samuel Bissell (April 28, 1797 – August 26, 1895), also known as Reverend Samuel Bissell or "Twinsburg's Schoolmaster," was an American Congregational minister, pioneering educator, and noted philanthropist in the Western Reserve region of Ohio. He is best known for his lifelong commitment to accessible, advanced education, which he implemented as the founder and sole director of the Twinsburg Institute in Twinsburg, Ohio. The Institute operated from 1865 until his death at the age of 98, distinguished by its policy of offering classical instruction entirely tuition-free.

== Early life ==
Bissell was born in Middlefield, Massachusetts in 1797. His family was among the early wave of settlers who relocated to the Connecticut Western Reserve, moving to Aurora, Ohio in 1806. Seeking advanced study, Bissell returned East, matriculating at Yale College and graduating in the Class of 1823. He later studied theology and was ordained as a Congregational minister.

Upon returning to Ohio, Bissell taught at the preparatory department of Western Reserve College in Hudson, Ohio, beginning around 1826. In 1828, he accepted the pastorate of the First Congregational Church in Twinsburg. His early ministry emphasized moral discipline, civic virtue, and personal improvement, principles that would guide his educational philosophy.

== Educational activities in Twinsburg ==
Bissell began teaching in Twinsburg shortly after his arrival. Initially, he instructed a small group in a log house, but increasing demand quickly led him to construct a dedicated school.

=== The Precursor School (1837–1865) ===
In 1837, Bissell built his first formal schoolhouse. By 1848, the institution had expanded to four buildings, staffed by seven teachers, serving roughly 300 students. The school notably included Native American students from the Seneca, Ottawa, and Potawatomi tribes, who received full access to the curriculum.

Financial hardship during the Civil War forced Bissell to liquidate several properties, covering an estimated $6,000 in debt.

=== Founding the Twinsburg Institute (1865) ===
In 1865, determined to restore his educational mission, Bissell founded the Twinsburg Institute. Intended as a rigorous classical and preparatory academy, it addressed a critical educational gap in Summit County.

Construction of the permanent stone building began around 1866–1867. Despite his age, Bissell personally quarried and laid much of the heavy sandstone. The completed two-story structure became a notable example of local 19th-century stone architecture and was later listed on the National Register of Historic Places.

== Educational philosophy and impact ==
Sketch of Samuel Bissell, c. 1896

Bissell insisted upon completely tuition-free instruction throughout the Institute’s 31-year history. More than 6,000 students attended during its operation, many from disadvantaged backgrounds.

The curriculum emphasized classical education, including:

- Latin and Greek
- Mathematics and natural philosophy
- Rhetoric, logic, and moral ethics

Many graduates went on to become teachers, ministers, professionals, and civic leaders.

== Personal life ==
Outside of his school duties, Bissell remained deeply involved in community life. He organized literacy programs, lectured on temperance, and hosted annual public exhibitions featuring debates and performances. He was married twice, first to Fanny P. Gaylord in 1824, and later to Cynthia Amelia Sykes. Known for his austere lifestyle, he devoted nearly all of his income to sustaining the Institute. Bissell died on August 26, 1895, at age 98.

== Legacy ==
With no successor able to maintain its philanthropic model, the Institute closed soon after. Structural instability caused by the heavy sandstone led to the removal of the second story before 1917. In 1917, the building was purchased by The Grange and used as a community hall for decades. Since 1964, it has served as the headquarters and museum of the Twinsburg Historical Society.

Bissell's reputation as a dedicated educator and philanthropist continued well into the 20th century, leading to his commemoration by the modern Twinsburg City School District. In 1964, the district opened Samuel Bissell Elementary School in Twinsburg, Ohio. The school was named in his honor to recognize and preserve his legacy as a pioneer schoolmaster who championed inclusive, accessible education in the Western Reserve.
