= List of Upper Canada College alumni =

The following is a list of prominent Upper Canada College (UCC) alumni. UCC's alumni are usually known simply as Old Boys (as is common with most all-male private schools). They include:

== Academia ==
- Arthur, James Greig (1962) – world's leading mathematician in representation theory and creator of the General Trace Formula
- Assikinack, Francis (1848) – Ojibwe historian and treaty negotiator
- Bethune, Charles James Stewart (1856) – headmaster of Trinity College School; co-founder of Entomological Society of Canada
- Biggar, James H. ρ (1926) – founder of Visites Interprovinviales, later the Society for Educational Visits and Exchanges in Canada
- Clarkson, Stephen FRSC ρ (1954) – foreign policy and Canadian history expert and Governor General's Award winner
- Cooper, John Julius, 2nd Viscount Norwich CVO (1942) – British historian, travel writer, and television personality
- Crooks, Adam – first chancellor of the University of Toronto and Attorney General of Canada
- Cruikshank, Ernest Alexander (1872) – Canadian historian and founder of the Ontario Historical Society
- Denison, George Taylor III FRSC (1856) – founder of Canada First and the Canadian National Association
- Eayrs, James (1938) – political scientist; Governor General's Award winner
- Eksteins, Modris ρ (1961) – historian of Germany
- Endicott, Timothy (1979) – first Dean of Law, University of Oxford
- Ewart, John S. QC – lawyer, Canadian historian, and advocate of Canadian independence
- Fleming, James Henry (1892) – ornithologist
- Grant, George P. OC FRSC (1936) – philosopher and author
- Grier, Terry (c. 1954) – president of Ryerson University and New Democratic Party member of parliament
- Jennings, William Tyndale – civil engineer, city engineer for Toronto, and president of the Canadian Society of Civil Engineers (later the Engineering Institute of Canada)
- Keefer, Thomas (1838) – aquatics civil engineer, president of the American Society of Civil Engineers, and founder of the Canadian Society for Civil Engineering
- Kilbourn, William CM FRSC (1944) – author, historian, and executive of the Canada Council and Canadian commission for UNESCO
- Loudin, James FRSC (1858) – first physics professor at the University of Toronto and president of the Royal Society of Canada
- MacInnis, Dr. Joseph CM (1956) – explorer, leader of the dive to film the RMS Titanic in IMAX, and the first person to dive under the North Pole
- Macklem, Michael CM – founder of Oberon Press
- McNaught, Kenneth OC (c. 1936) – historian and author
- Parmenter, Ross (1929) – music editor at the New York Times and expert on indigenous Mexican culture
- Patterson, John Andrew – president of the Astronomical and Physical Society of Toronto and prominent lawyer
- Ryerson, Stanley Bréhaut (c. 1929) – historian and communist activist
- Singer, Peter (1978) – director of Joint Centre for Bioethics at the University of Toronto and programme director at the Canadian Program on Genomics
- Stupart, Sir Robert Fredrick (1872) – pioneer of public weather forecasts; director of the National Meteorological Society
- Tyrell, Joseph FRSC (1878) – discoverer of dinosaur bones in Alberta and in whose honour the Royal Tyrrell Museum of Palaeontology is named
- Wright, Sir Charles Seymour (1904) – team physicist on Robert Scott's Antarctic expedition and developer of the "trench wireless" during the First World War

== Arts and media ==
=== Literature and journalism ===
- Bacque, James – author
- Black, Conrad, Baron Black of Crossharbour KCSG (did not graduate) – author, newspaper baron
- Bruce, Addington (c. 1892) – journalist and American historian
- Chewitt, William Cameron (c. 1846) – Canadian publisher; one of the first two members of the University of Toronto to graduate in medicine
- Colapinto, John (c. 1977) – award-winning journalist, novelist and staff writer for The New Yorker
- Davies, Robertson CC OOnt FRSC FRSL (1932) – author, playwright, and journalist
- Fraser, Graham (c. 1964) – Canadian journalist and languages commissioner of Canada
- Fraser, John CM (1963) – Editor of Saturday Night Magazine; master of Massey College
- Gilmour, David (1968) – journalist, novelist, winner of the Governor General's Award for English-language fiction
- Glazebrook, G.P. de T. (George Parkin de Twenebroker) FRSC – Canadian historian
- Graham, Patrick (1984) journalist and screenwriter
- Heintzman, Andrew (1986) – founder and editor of Shift magazine
- Leacock, Stephen FRSC (1882) – writer and economist
- MacLean, Rory FRSL (1954) – writer and broadcaster
- Newman, Peter C. CC CD (1947) – Peabody Award-winning journalist; former editor of Macleans and the Toronto Star
- Robertson, John Ross (1850) – journalist and founder of Toronto Evening Telegram, in whose honour John Ross Robertson Public School is named
- Scadding, Henry (1833) – educator, rector, and writer
- Stackhouse, John (1981) – author; editor of The Globe and Mail
- Symons, Thomas CC OOnt (1942) – founding president of Trent University and Canadian studies author

=== Music and radio ===
- Cuddy, Jim (1974) – founder and member of Blue Rodeo
- Dako, Del (1972) – jazz musician
- Gibson, Dan OC (1940) – creator of Solitudes
- Gooderham, Albert Edward (1879) – founder of the Canadian Academy of Music (later the Royal Conservatory of Music) and president of the Toronto Symphony Orchestra
- Hewitt, Bill (1949) – broadcasting mogul and Hockey Night in Canada announcer
- Hewitt, Foster OC (1921) – broadcaster and Hockey Hall of Fame inductee
- MacDermot, Galt (1942) – Grammy Award-winning musician and co-author of the Broadway musical Hair
- McFee, Allan (1931) – CBC radio broadcaster and announcer for the Royal Canadian Air Farce
- McNaught, John (c. 1920) – Canadian radio broadcaster and writer

=== Visual media ===
- Band, Charles Shaw CC (c. 1903) – philanthropist, art collector, and twice President of the Art Gallery of Ontario
- Bassett, Douglas OC (1958) – member of the Canadian Association of Broadcasters Hall of Fame, president of the CTV Television Network, and founder of CFTO-TV
- Brooks, Daniel (1976) – playwright and winner of the first Siminovitch Prize in Theatre
- Burke, Edmund W. (1891) – architect of Prince Edward Viaduct and the Simpson's (now Hudson's Bay Company) flagship store in Toronto
- Campbell, Nicholas (1970) – filmmaker and actor, Canadian film and television
- Clark, Tom (1971) – television journalist, anchorman, and CTV Washington Bureau chief
- Daly, Thomas C. OC (1936) – National Film Board of Canada leader and Oscar-winning film producer.
- Darling, Frank RIBA (1859) – architect of the Centre Block on Parliament Hill, Convocation Hall, and Trinity College, and winner of the Royal Gold Medal
- Davies, Geraint Wyn (1975) – actor
- Deeks, Jim (1967) – television journalist and political advisor
- Dick, Leonard (1982) – Emmy Award, Golden Globe, and Writers Guild Award-winning producer and writer of Lost, House, and many sitcoms
- Douglas, Melvyn (1913) – Academy Award-winning actor
- Dunn, Barrie (1971) - Co-creator, writer, producer Trailer Park Boys (Left school in April, 1970)
- Eckler, Greg (1987) Canadian Screen Award-winning writer, The Rick Mercer Report
- Felix, Enrique Alvarez (1954) – Mexican actor
- Flaherty, Robert (1903) – pioneer of documentary films, including Nanook of the North
- Fraser, Brendan (1987) – Academy Award-winning actor (left school in final year)
- Gelber, Arthur CC (1934) – founder of the Ontario Arts Council and chairman of National Arts Centre
- Grier, Sir Edmund Wyly (1877) – Portraitist and president of the Royal Canadian Academy of Arts
- Kane, Paul (1830) – painter of the Canadian north and other pioneer landscapes
- Koffman, Jeffrey (1977) – Emmy Award-winning journalist; ABC news anchor and bureau chief
- Law, Charles Anthony DSC (1935) – official war artist
- Lewis, Avi (c. 1986) – politician, journalist and television host
- MacMillan, Michael CM – Academy Award winner; CEO of Alliance Atlantis
- Massey, Raymond Hart (1910) – actor and Hollywood Walk of Fame inductee
- Massey, Walter (c. 1945) – actor, voice of Principal Heney on Arthur
- Mettler, Peter – Genie, National Film Board of Canada, and other awards-winning writer and director
- Moore, James Mavor CC OBC (1929) – founding head of the Guild of Canadian Playwrights and founder of St. Lawrence Centre for the Arts
- Snow, Michael CC (1948) – multimedia modern artist
- Sultanov, Sanzhar (2007) – film producer and director
- Taché, Eugène-Étienne ISO (1849) – architect of the Assemblée nationale du Québec building, designer of Québec's Coat of Arms, and author of the province's motto Je me souviens
- Wachter, Charles (1993) – Emmy Award-winning executive producer of Jamie Oliver's Food Revolution
- Watier, Martin (1992) – actor and specialist in dubbing

== Business ==
- Alexander, Richard Henry – founder and President of the Vancouver Board of Trade, founder of the Vancouver Club, and Commodore of the Royal Vancouver Yacht Club
- Beatty, David Ross CM OBE (1959) – international business expert, diplomat, and chairman of the Board of Governors of Upper Canada College
- Beatty, William Henry – Director of Gooderham & Worts, vice-president Canada's first trust company, and President of the Bank of Toronto
- Caldwell, Theo (1991) – President of Caldwell Asset Management, journalist, and radio commentator
- Cameron, Alexander – businessman and founder of Essex, Ontario
- Cheesbrough, Gordon – chairman and chief executive officer of Altamira and chairman of the Board of Governors of Upper Canada College
- Cohon, Craig – businessman and environmental activist
- Eaton, Fred (1982) – catamaran designer and winner of the International Catamaran Challenge Trophy
- Eaton, Sir John Craig (c. 1894) – chairman and chief executive officer of the T. Eaton Company
- Eaton, John Craig OOnt – chairman and chief executive officer of the T. Eaton Company and Chancellor of Ryerson University
- Eaton, Timothy (c. 1852) – founder of the now-defunct Eaton's department store
- Ho, Lawrence – chairman and chief executive officer of Melco International
- Hutcheson, Blake (1980) – President and CEO of Oxford Properties
- Jarvis, Aemilius - financier and yachtsman, builder of King Edward Hotel and first winner of Canada's Cup yacht race
- Lang, Stu – President of CCL Industries
- Pellatt, Sir Henry CVO – Major General, financier, and builder of Casa Loma
- Prichard, Robert OC OOnt – chief executive officer of Torstar and president of the University of Toronto
- Rogers, Ted OC KBE (c. 1951) – Canada's ninth wealthiest man, chairman of Rogers Communications, full owner of the Toronto Blue Jays, and eponym of the Rogers Centre
- Tapscott, Alex (2004) – Business author, investor, and blockchain and cryptocurrency expert
- Szaky, Tom (2001) – co-founder of TerraCycle
- Thomson, David, 3rd Baron Thomson of Fleet (c. 1975) – Canada's wealthiest man, sixth wealthiest in the world, and Chairman of Thomson Corporation
- Thomson, Kenneth, 2nd Baron Thomson of Fleet (c. 1941) – formerly Canada's wealthiest man; Chairman of Thomson Corporation
- Weston, Galen OC OOnt (c. 1958) – Canada's second wealthiest man and Chairman of the George Weston Limited
- Weston, Galen Jr. (1993) – executive chairman of Loblaw Companies
- Weston, George – founder of George Weston Limited

== Educators ==
- Connell, George OC FCIC FRSC (1947) – President of the University of Toronto and the University of Western Ontario; director of Allelix Biopharmaceuticals
- Dale, Williams (c. 1866) – educationalist; mayor of St. Mary's, Ontario
- Eaton, Fred OC OOnt FRSC (1957) – High Commissioner to the United Kingdom; Chancellor of the University of New Brunswick
- Merritt, Thomas Rodman (c. 1842) – Member of Parliament; founder and president of Ridley College
- Prichard, Robert OC OOnt (1967) – President of the University of Toronto and president of Star Media Group
- Ridpath, John (c. 1954) – Objectivist philosopher and retired York University associate Professor of Economics and Intellectual History

== Humanitarians ==
- Barrett, Anthony (1964) – founder of Pollution Probe; Chief Financial Officer of the World Wildlife Fund of Canada
- Barton, Eric CM (1957) – founder of a leprosy treatment centre in India; principal of UCC
- Douglas, Ian CM CD QC – founding president of the Canadian Epilepsy Association; chairman of the National Board of Governors of the Canadian Corps of Commissionaires

== Legal ==
- Armour, John Douglas QC (c. 1848) – chief justice of Ontario; justice of the Supreme Court of Canada
- Biggar, Oliver Mowat (1894) – Canada's first chief electoral officer; chief Canadian legal advisor to the Treaty of Versailles
- Boyd, Sir John Alexander KCMG QC (c. 1855) – Chancellor of the Court of Chancery; president of the High Court of Ontario
- Burns, Robert Easton – Puisne judge of the Court of Queen's Bench, Chancellor of the University of Toronto, and Treasurer of the Law Society of Upper Canada
- Cameron, John Hillyard QC (1833) – Member of Parliament, co-founder of the Canada Life Assurance Company, and solicitor general of Upper Canada
- Cartwright, John Robert PC CC MC (1912) – Chief Justice of Canada
- Cross, Charles Wilson – first Attorney-General of Alberta; member of the Legislative Assembly of Alberta and of the Canadian House of Commons
- Ewart, J. S. QC (c. 1867) – advocate of Canadian independence
- Harlan, John Marshall II ρ (1911) – Associate Justice of the United States Supreme Court
- Hughes, Samuel QC, a judge of the Supreme Court of Ontario and Chairman of the Hughes Inquiry
- Jaffer, Jameel (1990) – human rights and civil liberties attorney, Deputy Legal Director of the American Civil Liberties Union, and Director of the ACLU's Center for Democracy
- Macleod, James Farquharson (1848) – Colonel, pioneer of Alberta and third Commissioner of the Royal Canadian Mounted Police
- McMurtry, Roy (c. 1950) – Chief Justice of the Ontario Superior Court of Justice and High Commissioner to the United Kingdom
- Robinson, Christopher (c. 1846) – Attorney General of Canada
- Wallbridge, Lewis QC (c. 1834) – Chief Justice of Manitoba, speaker of the Legislative Assembly of the Province of Canada, and director of the Bank of Upper Canada

== Medicine ==
- Bethune, Norman Sr. FRCS (c. 1840) – Canadian doctor; father of Norman Bethune
- Burgess, Thomas Joseph Workman FRSC (1866) – leader in psychiatry in Canada; President of the Société Médico-Psychologique de Québec and American Medico-Psychological Association (later the American Psychiatric Association)
- Mack, Theophilus – leader in obstetrics and gynaecology; founder of St. Catharines General Hospital
- McCulloch, Ernest OC OOnt FRSC – Lasker Award winner accredited with the discovery of the stem cell; Canadian Medical Hall of Fame inductee
- Qaadri, Shafiq (1982) – University of Toronto graduate, medical journalist, and Ontario Member of Provincial Parliament
- Rowan Paul, MD (1996) – Brown University, Albany Medical College, Stanford University Healthcare, University of Utah graduate, Physician, Pioneer Regenerative Orthopedics and Sports Medicine, Med Tech Entrepreneur, and Founder RegenCore Medical, Launch Regenerative, Physical Longevity, TOBI Networks Accredited with the performing the world's first Intraosseous photomechanical (Regenelase) Laser treatment

== Military service ==
- Boulton, Charles Arkoll (c. 1859) – leader of the militant opposition against the rebellion led by Louis Riel; later a Canadian Senator
- Cockburn, Hampden Zane Churchill VC (1881) – recipient of the Victoria Cross
- Crerar, Henry Duncan Graham PC CB CH DSO CD HDG (1904) – General, Chief of the General Staff, and Commander of the First Canadian Army
- Denison, George Taylor II – Colonel, supporter of the early Canadian militia, and commander during the Fenian Raids
- Denison, George Taylor III FRSC – lawyer, commander of the Governor General's Body Guard, founder of the Canada First movement and the British Empire League, and military historian
- Dunkelman, Ben (1930) – Israeli war hero
- Dunn, Alexander Roberts VC (1844) – first recipient of the Victoria Cross
- Geary, George Reginald PC OBE MC (c. 1891) – Lt. Colonel, cabinet minister, commander of the Royal Grenadier Regiment, and mayor of Toronto
- Gressett, Sir Arthur Edward KBE CB DSO MC Lieutenant-General in the British Army
- Gordon, James Neil DSO CD, Brigadier General, as a Major he commanded a company of The Queen's Own Rifles of Canada on D-Day landing at Juno Beach, later becoming commanding officer of The North Shore (New Brunswick) Regiment for the remainder of the war, and post war Commanding Officer and then Honorary Colonel of The Queen's Own Rifles.
- Little, Charles Herbert CD FRCGS ρ (1926) – Director of naval intelligence during the Second World War
- Pettler, Levi CB OBE DSO – Major General, acclaimed war hero, and commander of the Royal Engineers
- Williams, David Russell (1982) – former Canadian Forces Air Command colonel, commander of CFB Trenton, and convicted murderer

== State affairs, diplomacy, and politics ==
=== Ambassadors, high commissioners, and diplomats ===
- Campbell, Arthur Grant
- Eaton, Fredrik Stefan OC OOnt – Canadian High Commissioner to the United Kingdom
- George, James ρ (1936) – Canadian ambassador to Iran, high commissioner to India, and world renowned activist
- Graham, John (1952) – diplomat to Cuba, Central Intelligence Agency spy, and first Head of the Organization of American States
- Smith, Arnold Cantwell CH OC ρ (1932) – Canadian ambassador to Moscow and Cambodia, and secretary-general of the Commonwealth Secretariat
- Wilson, Michael PC OC (1955) – minister of finance, chairman and chief executive officer of UBS AG, chancellor of the University of Trinity College, and Canadian ambassador to the United States
- Wrong, Hume (1909) – Canadian ambassador to Washington and part author of the North Atlantic Treaty

=== Parliamentarians ===
- Bosley, John William PC (1964) – Speaker of the House of Commons of Canada
- Boulton, D'Arcy (c. 1843) – Member of the Legislative Assembly of Ontario; Grandmaster of the Grand Black Chapter of British America
- Bristol, Edmund James PC QC – Member of the Canadian House of Commons and minister without portfolio in the federal Cabinet
- Cameron, John Hillyard (c. 1835) – Conservative member of the House of Commons of Canada and solicitor general for Upper Canada
- Cartwright, Matt – Member of the United States House of Representatives
- Cassidy, Michael (1954) – Member of the Legislative Assembly of Ontario, member of the Canadian parliament and leader of the Ontario New Democratic Party
- Cockburn, James QC (1833) – Father of Confederation and the first Speaker of the House of Commons of Canada
- Crooks, Adam QC (1846) – Member of the Legislative Assembly of Ontario and first Ontario minister of education
- Harrison, Alexander Robert QC (c. 1851) – Conservative member of the first Canadian parliament
- Heap, Dan (1943) – New Democratic Party member of parliament
- Ignatieff, Michael PC (1965) – former leader of the Liberal Party of Canada and Her Majesty's Loyal Opposition, noted historian and journalist
- Kelly, Norm (c. 1959) – Member of Parliament, Toronto city councillor, Deputy Mayor of Toronto
- Lubbock, Eric, 4th Baron Avebury (c. 1946) – Member of the House of Lords and member of the Liberal Democrats foreign affairs team
- Macaughton, Alan PC OC KC (1921) – former Speaker of Parliament and Canadian senator
- McDonald, Donald (1830) – Member of the Legislative Council of the Province of Canada, Liberal Senator, and vice-president of the Royal Canadian Bank
- Merritt, Thomas Rodman (c. 1842) – Member of the House of Commons of Canada and vice-president of the Imperial Bank of Canada
- Saxton, Andrew (1982) – Conservative member of parliament, Parliamentary Secretary to the Minister of Finance and businessman
- Sheard, Charles – Chief Medical Officer of Toronto, Chairman of the Ontario Board of Health, and Member of Parliament
- Small, James Edward – Member of the Legislative Assembly of Upper Canada and Legislative Assembly of the Province of Canada and Solicitor General of Canada West
- Wrzesnewskyj, Borys (c. 1978) – Member of the Canadian Parliament; owner of Future Bakery restaurants

=== Premiers and mayors ===
- Allan, George William PC FRCGS (1835) – Mayor of Toronto and Canadian senator
- Beaven, Robert (1844) – Premier of British Columbia
- Blake, Edward PC (1850) – Premier of Ontario, federal Cabinet minister, member of the Canadian parliament, member of the British parliament
- Bowlby, Ward Hamilton KC – Reeve of Berlin, Ontario (now known as Kitchener), barrister, director of the Economical Fire Insurance Company
- Chisholm, George King – first Mayor of Oakville and Sergeant-at-Arms for the Legislative Assembly of the Province of Canada
- Drew, George PC CC KC (1913) – Premier of Ontario and Canadian High Commissioner to the United Kingdom
- Hoyles, Newman Wright – third Premier of Newfoundland Colony and member of the colonial legislative assembly
- Lamport, Allan CM (1923) – Mayor of Toronto
- Tonks, Alan (1959) – Member of Parliament and Mayor of Toronto

=== Ministers and advisors ===
- Agnew, John Hume (c. 1881) – Manitoba Cabinet minister
- Beatty, Perrin PC (1968) – Cabinet minister, president of the Canadian Broadcasting Corporation, and Chancellor of the University of Ontario Institute of Technology
- Cameron, Matthew Crooks OBE (1838) – Cabinet member of premier John Sandfield Macdonald and provincial secretary and registrar of Ontario
- Daly, Thomas Mayne PC QC – Minister of the Interior, Superintendent-General of Indian Affairs, and Minister of Justice and Attorney General of Canada
- Godfrey, John PC (1961) – Canadian minister of state for infrastructure and communities, and editor of the Financial Post
- Gordon, Walter L. PC CC (1922) – Canadian minister of finance and chancellor of York University
- Graham, Bill PC QC (1957) – former Liberal Party Member of Parliament and Foreign Affairs Minister
- Hughes, Sir Samuel PC KCB (c. 1871) – Canadian minister of militia during the First World War
- Ibbs, Sir Robin KBE (1942) – Chairman of Lloyd's Bank and senior advisor to British Prime Minister Margaret Thatcher
- Marling, Alexander – Deputy Minister of Education for Ontario
- O'Reilly, John (1953) – Chief Meteorologist of Ontario
- Rossi, Rocco (1981) – national director of the Liberal Party of Canada, advisor to Liberal leader Michael Ignatieff, businessman

=== Viceroys ===
- Aikins, James Albert Manning (1871) – founder of the Canadian Bar Association, member of the Canadian parliament, and Lieutenant Governor of Manitoba
- Aird, John Black CC OOnt QC (1941) – founder of Aird & Berlis LLP and Lieutenant Governor of Ontario
- Hendrie, Sir John Strathearn KCMG CVO (1874) – Lieutenant Governor of Ontario
- Jackman, Henry OC OOnt (1950) – Chief executive officer of the National Trust and Empire Life Insurance, and Lieutenant Governor of Ontario
- Robinson, John Beverley PC (1836) – President of the Queen's Privy Council for Canada, mayor of Toronto, and Lieutenant Governor of Ontario
- Tupper, William Johnston (c. 1880) – Lieutenant Governor of Manitoba

== Religion ==
- Hutchison, Andrew (1956) – Primate of the Anglican Church of Canada
- McLeod, Bruce (1946) – Moderator of the United Church of Canada and president of the Canadian Council of Churches

== Sports ==
- Ballard, Harold (c. 1921) – owner of the Toronto Maple Leafs, Hamilton Tiger-Cats, and Maple Leaf Gardens, and Hockey Hall of Fame inductee
- Barry, Michael (1993) – professional cyclist and member of Lance Armstrong's Discovery Channel Pro Cycling Team
- Beare, John (1992) – 2008 Olympic bronze medallist in the Men's Four
- Cohon, Mark – 12th commissioner of the Canadian Football League, director of corporate and game development for Major League Baseball International, National Basketball Association vice-president of business development, and chair of the Ontario Science Centre and Canadian Academy of Recording Arts and Sciences
- Conacher, Brian (1961) – member of the 1967 Stanley Cup Toronto Maple Leafs and the 1964 Olympic Canadian hockey team
- Elder, James OC (1953) – 1956 and 1968 Olympics equestrian gold medallist
- Elkinson, Kilian (2008) – member of the Toronto FC
- Faust, Andre (c. 1987) – member of the Philadelphia Flyers
- Greening, Colin (2005) – member of the Toronto Maple Leafs
- Irwin, Brayden (c. 2004) – former member of the Toronto Maple Leafs
- Kerr, John (1970) – 1984 Olympics sailing bronze medallist
- Mara, George CM (1941) – Captain of the 1948 Olympic gold medal-winning Canadian hockey team, director of Maple Leaf Gardens, and Canada's Sports Hall of Fame inductee
- O'Connor, Matt (2010) – member of the Ottawa Senators
- Ogden, Edward (1876) – first-class cricketer
- Smythe, Conn (1909) – owner of the Toronto Maple Leafs; founder of Maple Leaf Gardens; coach of the 1928 Winter Olympics gold medal-winning team; namesake of the NHL's Conn Smythe Trophy
- Spencer, Vic – founding director of the BC Lions, Canadian Football League Hall of Fame inductee, and Canadian Football League fullback, and founding partner and director of Delta Hotels
- Williams, Barney (1996) – 2004 Olympic games men's coxless four silver medallist
- Wright, Tom E.S. (1971) – Director of Operations for UFC Canada, former Commissioner of the Canadian Football League and former president of Adidas Canada
