= Gordon Cheesbrough =

Canadian businessman

Gordon Franklin Cheesbrough
- Born: 1952
- Died: 23 June 2010 (aged 57–58); Toronto General Hospital
- Citizenship: Canadian
- Known for: Entrepreneurial work
- Board member of: North York General Hospital

Gordon Franklin Cheesbrough was a Canadian businessman.

== Business career ==
At age 38, he was named President and CEO of investment firm Scotia Mcleod and then Chairman and CEO of the successor organization, Scotia Capital Markets. His responsibilities in the latter position included supervision of all the global activities of the firm.

In 1998, Cheesbrough became President and CEO of Altamira Investment Services, one of Canada's largest independent mutual fund firms at the time. He later oversaw the restructuring and eventual sale of the company to the National Bank of Canada.

In 2002, Cheesbrough co-founded investment firm Blair Franklin Capital Partners with partner Steven Sharpe.

In 2007, Blair Franklin was selected by the Waters family to seek a buyer for their controlling interest in media company Chum Limited. On June 28, 2007, the two competing firms, Astral and Bell Globemedia delivered their final proposals, with Bell Globemedia prevailing with a bid totaling $1.7-billion.

Cheesbrough was also Deputy Chairman of Alterra Capital Holdings, headquartered in Bermuda.

== Charity & Board of Director Positions ==
Cheesbrough was a Director of the Canadian National Stock Exchange (CNSX Markets Inc.). He also served on the Dean's Advisory Board of the University of Toronto. Cheesbrough recently retired from the Board of Governors of the North York General Hospital, after completing more than ten years of board contribution, the last five as Chair. Previously he was a member of the boards at Upper Canada College, Canadian Tire Corporation, and the Toronto Community Foundation.

== Death ==
Gordon Cheesbrough died at Toronto General Hospital after a short battle with lymphoma on June 23, 2010.
