= Minister of Artificial Intelligence and Digital Innovation =

Canadian cabinet position

- Ministre de l'Intelligence artificielle et de l'Innovation numérique
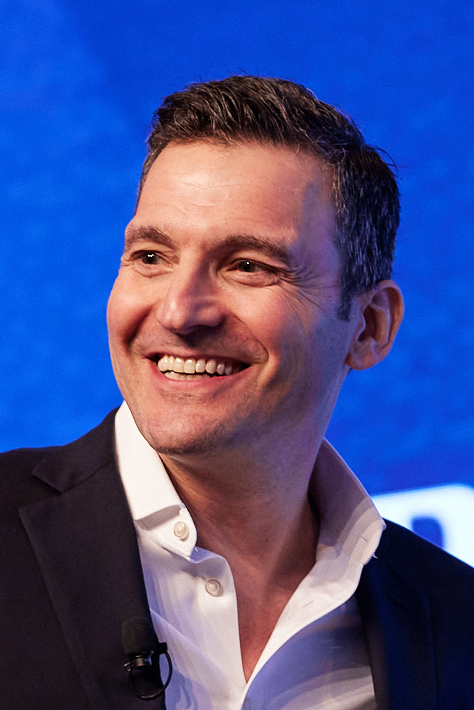
- Incumbent; Evan Solomon since May 13, 2025
- Innovation, Science and Economic Development Canada
- Style: The Honourable
- Member of: House of Commons; Privy Council; Cabinet
- Reports to: Parliament; Prime Minister
- Appointer: Monarch (represented by the governor general); on the advice of the prime minister
- Term length: At His Majesty's pleasure
- Inaugural holder: Evan Solomon
- Formation: May 13, 2025

The minister of artificial intelligence and digital innovation (French: ministre de l'Intelligence artificielle et de l'innovation numérique) is a minister of the Crown in the Cabinet of Canada supported by Innovation, Science and Economic Development Canada. The office was created in 2025 and Evan Solomon serves as the first and current minister.

== List of ministers ==
Key:

Liberal Party of Canada

No.	Portrait	Name	Term of office		Political party	Ministry
1		Evan Solomon	May 13, 2025	Incumbent	Liberal	30 (Carney)
