= Evan Solomon =

Canadian politician and broadcaster (born 1968)

The Honourable Evan Solomon PC MP
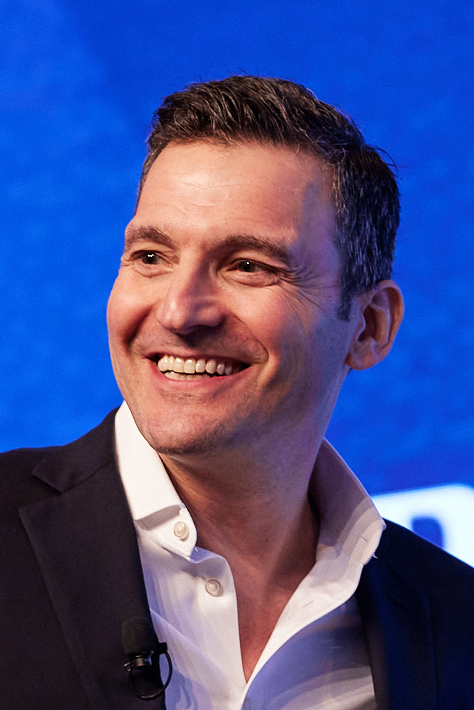
- Solomon in 2023

Minister of Artificial Intelligence and Digital Innovation
- Incumbent
- Assumed office May 13, 2025
- Prime Minister: Mark Carney
- Preceded by: position established

Minister responsible for the Federal Economic Development Agency for Southern Ontario
- Incumbent
- Assumed office May 13, 2025
- Prime Minister: Mark Carney
- Preceded by: Ruby Sahota

Member of Parliament for Toronto Centre
- Incumbent
- Assumed office April 28, 2025
- Preceded by: Marci Ien

Personal details
- Born: April 20, 1968 (age 58) Toronto, Ontario, Canada
- Party: Liberal
- Education: McGill University
- Occupation: Publisher, broadcaster, politician

Evan Solomon (born April 20, 1968) is a Canadian politician and broadcaster who has been the minister of artificial intelligence and digital innovation since May 2025. A member of the Liberal Party, Solomon was elected as the member of Parliament (MP) for Toronto Centre in the April 2025 election.

He was the host of The Evan Solomon Show on Toronto-area talk radio station CFRB, and a writer for Maclean's magazine. He was the host of CTV's national political news programs Power Play and Question Period. In October 2022, he moved to New York City to accept a position with the Eurasia Group as publisher of GZERO Media. Solomon continued with CTV News as a "special correspondent" reporting on Canadian politics and global affairs."

From 1994 to 2015, Solomon was a host for many shows on CBC News.

== Life and career ==
Solomon was born in Toronto, Ontario, the son of Virginia, an urban planner, and Carl Solomon, a lawyer. He graduated from high school at Crescent School in Toronto, Ontario. He then graduated from McGill University in English literature and religious studies.

In 1992, Solomon co-founded Shift with Andrew Heintzman. Originally an arts and culture magazine, Shift evolved to focus particularly on technology and Internet culture. Solomon left the magazine in 1999 to promote his first novel, Crossing the Distance. Solomon has also worked as a broadcaster, hosting the series The Changemakers, FutureWorld and Hot Type for the Canadian Broadcasting Corporation. In 2004, Solomon worked as co-editor, with Heintzman, on Fueling the Future: How the Battle Over Energy is Changing Everything. He was the co-anchor with Carole MacNeil of CBC News: Sunday and CBC News: Sunday Night from 2004 to 2009.

In 2009, Solomon was chosen to host the political discussion show Power & Politics on CBC News Network and CBC Radio One's weekly political affairs series The House.

On June 9, 2015, Solomon was fired from CBC after the Toronto Star reported that he allegedly took secret commissions for brokering art sales of items owned by his friend and art collector Bruce Bailey to people he was connected to through his CBC position, including Mark Carney.

In August 2015, SiriusXM Canada announced that it had hired Solomon to host a political talk show, Everything Is Political, on its Canada Talks channel during the 2015 election. Solomon also wrote a column for Maclean's magazine for the duration of the election campaign.

In 2016, Solomon announced that he was joining the Ottawa-area talk radio station CFRA.

From 2016 to 2022, he was the host of CTV's political affairs program Question Period and was also a substitute anchor for CTV National News.

In September 2017, Solomon joined CFRB in Toronto for a new national talk radio program, The Evan Solomon Show, that aired on Bell Media radio stations nationally until Solomon's departure in October 2022.

In 2022, Solomon joined GZERO Media as publisher. The global affairs news site is a subsidiary of political risk analysis firm Eurasia Group. Solomon continued to serve as a political and global affairs correspondent for CTV.

In March 2025, Solomon announced that he had left his roles at Eurasia Group and GZERO to run as a Liberal Party of Canada candidate for the riding of Toronto Centre in the 2025 Canadian federal election. He had resigned his position with CTV prior to Mark Carney's election as Liberal leader.

== Personal life ==
Solomon is married to Tammy Quinn. The couple have two children. Solomon is Jewish.

== Electoral record ==
2025 Canadian federal election: Toronto Centre
Party	Candidate	Votes	%	±%	Expenditures
Liberal	Evan Solomon	37,907	64.33	+14.47	
Conservative	Luis Ibarra	12,321	20.91	+7.97	
New Democratic	Samantha Green	7,358	12.49	–13.75	
Green	Olivia Iheme	664	1.13	–6.95	
People's	Nathen Mazri	235	0.40	–1.95	
Animal Protection	Simon Luisi	177	0.30	N/A	
Marxist–Leninist	Philip Fernandez	170	0.29	N/A	
Independent	Cleveland Marshall	90	0.15	N/A	
Total valid votes/expense limit		58,922	100.00		
Total rejected ballots		436			
Turnout		59,358	63.92		
Eligible voters		92,863			
Liberal notional hold		Swing		+9.92	
Source: Elections Canada

^ Change is from 2021 redistributed results.

Order of precedence
Preceded by Maninder Sidhu as Member of the Cabinet	Order of Precedence of Canada as Member of the Cabinet	Succeeded by Ruby Sahota as Secretary of State
