= Andrew Heintzman =

Canadian writer and venture capitalist

Andrew Heintzman is a Canadian author and venture capitalist.

He is president of Investeco Capital, an environmental investment company, and the author of The New Entrepreneurs: Building a Green Economy for the Future.

He was one of the founders of Shift in 1992, and was a member of the editorial board for the new Canadian magazine The Walrus.

He is co-editor along with Evan Solomon of a series of anthologies published by House of Anansi press, that are part of the Ingenuity Project. The first was Fueling the Future (ISBN 9780887847240), published in 2003, and the second was Feeding the Future (ISBN 9780887847448), published in 2005.
