= Upper Canada College =

Private all-boys school in Toronto, Canada

Coordinates: 43.693°N 79.404°W

Location
- 200 Lonsdale Road; Toronto, Ontario; Canada

Information
- School type: Independent day and boarding
- Motto: Palmam qui meruit ferat (Latin for 'Let he who merited the palm bear it')
- Established: 1829; 197 years ago
- Principal: Sam McKinney
- Faculty: 140
- Grades: Kindergarten to grade 12
- Enrolment: 1,146
  - K – grade 7: 416
  - Grades 8–12: 730
- Campus: Deer Park/Forest Hill (38.5 acres [15.6 ha], urban); Norval (450 acres [180 ha], rural)
- Colours: Blue; white
- Endowment: CA$150,000,000
- Visitor: Vacant
- Website: ucc.on.ca

Upper Canada College (UCC) is an independent day and boarding school for boys in Toronto, Ontario. It was founded in 1829 by Sir John Colborne, then Lieutenant Governor of Upper Canada, and modelled on Elizabeth College, Guernsey. After facing closure by the government on more than one occasion, UCC became fully independent in 1900, nine years after moving to its present location. It is the oldest independent school in the province of Ontario and the third oldest in Canada.

With around 1,200 students, UCC is highly selective. The school has a financial aid program which currently awards more than $5 million annually to Canadian citizens. The secondary school segment is divided into 10 houses; eight are for day students and the remaining two are for boarding students. Aside from the main structure, with its dominant clock tower, the Toronto campus has a number of sports facilities, staff and faculty residences, and other buildings. UCC also owns and operates an outdoor education campus in Norval, Ontario.

The school has produced many notable graduates.

== History ==
=== Beginnings and growth ===
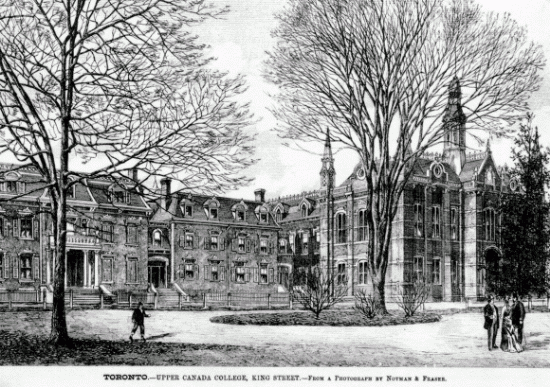
Drawing of the former UCC campus at King and Simcoe streets

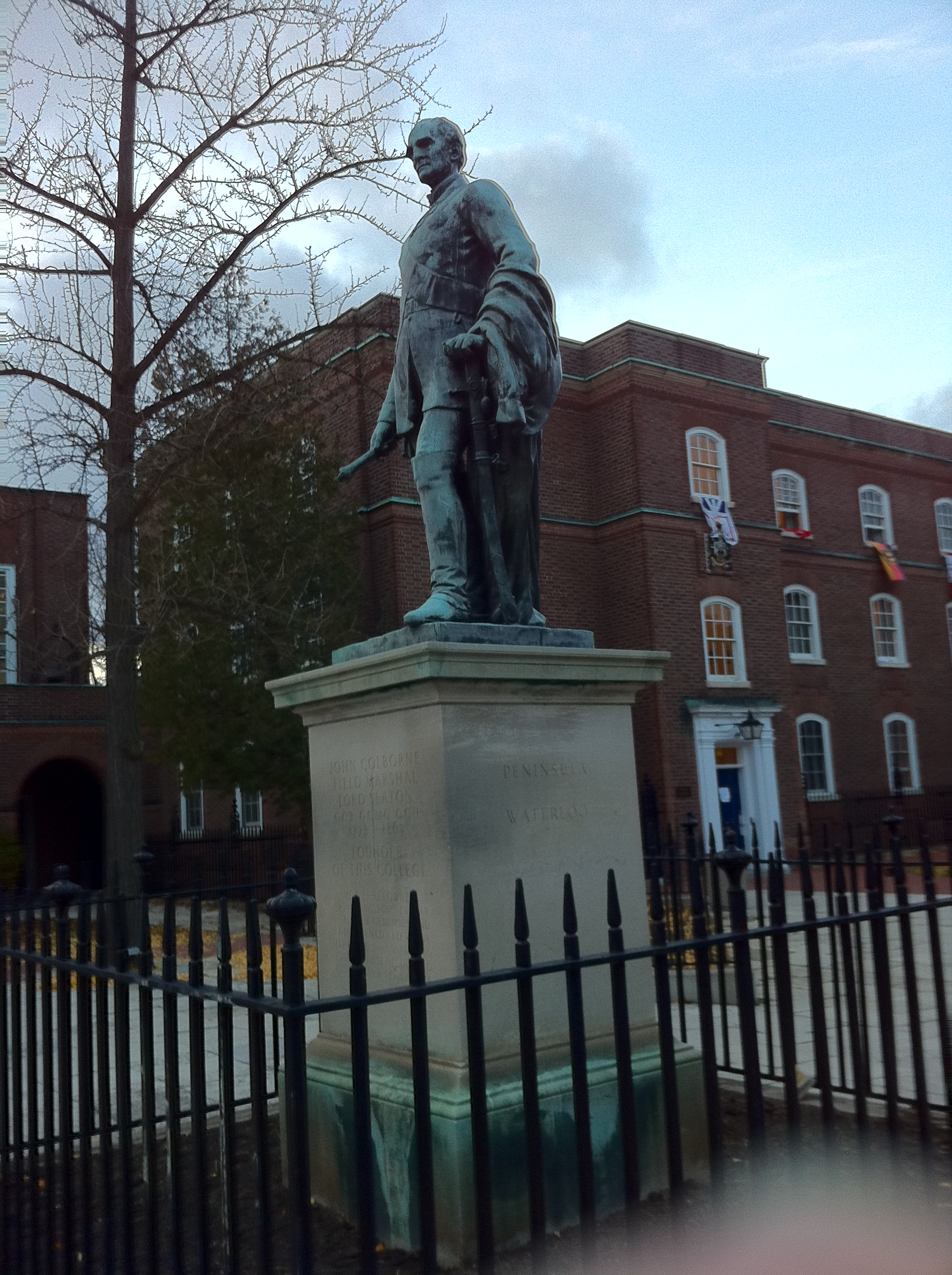
Statue at UCC of its founder, John Colborne, 1st Baron Seaton

UCC was founded in 1829 by Major-General Sir John Colborne (later the 1st Baron Seaton), then Lieutenant Governor of Upper Canada, in the hopes that it would serve as a feeder school to the newly established King's College (now known as the University of Toronto). UCC was modelled on the public schools of Great Britain, such as Eton College. Though now an independent school, the college was created with public funds, including an initial land grant of 6,000 acres of crown lands, later increased to 66,000 acres.

The school began teaching in the original Royal Grammar School. However, within a year, it was established on its own campus, known as Russell Square, at the north-west corner of King and Simcoe streets. Colborne brought educated men from the United Kingdom's Cambridge and Oxford Universities, attracting them with high salaries. Still, despite ever increasing enrolment, popularity with leading families of the day (both from the local Family Compact and from abroad); a visit in 1847 from the Governor General of the Province of Canada, the Earl of Elgin; and praise from many, including Charles Dickens, UCC was faced with closure on a number of occasions. Opponents of elitism sought to curtail provincial government funding and remove the college from its premises.

The school merged with King's College for a period after 1831 and moved 60 years later to its present location in Deer Park, then a rural area. The new building, designed by the London-based architect George F. Durand, featured a prominent centre block design overlooking Avenue Road. The school expanded in 1902 to take in lower-year students with the construction of a separate primary school building, the Prep, allowing for boys to be enrolled from Grade Three through to graduation.

In 1900, the government of Ontario stopped funding UCC, making it a completely independent school. By 1910, however, UCC was facing declining enrolment and capital; it considered selling the Deer Park campus and moving again to become a full boarding school on a property purchased in Norval, Ontario. Plans were halted by the outbreak of the First World War, and the college remained where it was. It eventually thrived there, both physically and culturally, as the buildings were expanded and bright instructors attracted.

Principal William Grant spearheaded further development. Shortly after assuming his position in 1917, he oversaw recruitment of teachers described as "eccentric, crotchety, quaint, though widely travelled and highly intelligent." His tenure also saw other improvements. Student enrolment doubled, and bursaries increased. Teacher salaries also doubled, and their benefits now included a pension plan.

UCC maintained a Cadet Corps from around 1837, which became a rifle company attached to the Volunteer Militia Rifles of Canada (later The Queen's Own Rifles of Canada) in 1860. It was one of only two student corps called to duty in Canadian military history when it assisted in staving off the Fenian Raids in 1866. Historian Jack Granatstein, in his book The Generals, demonstrated that UCC graduates accounted for more than 30 per cent of Canadian generals during the Second World War, and 26 Old Boys achieved brigadier rank or higher. A war memorial display case and plaque in the Upper School's main entrance hall is dedicated to the UCC Old Boys who distinguished themselves during Canadian military service periods.

=== After the Second World War ===
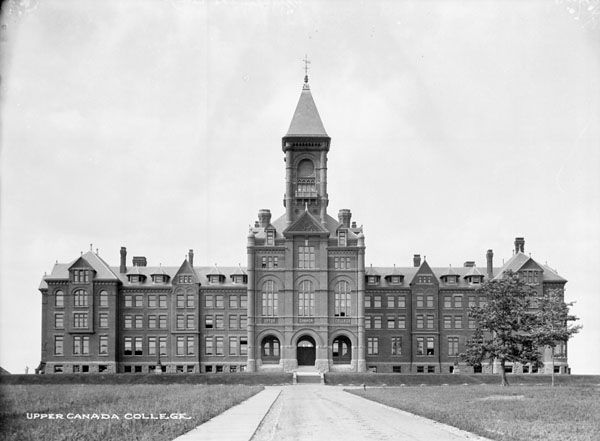
The original building in Deer Park, which had to be demolished in 1958

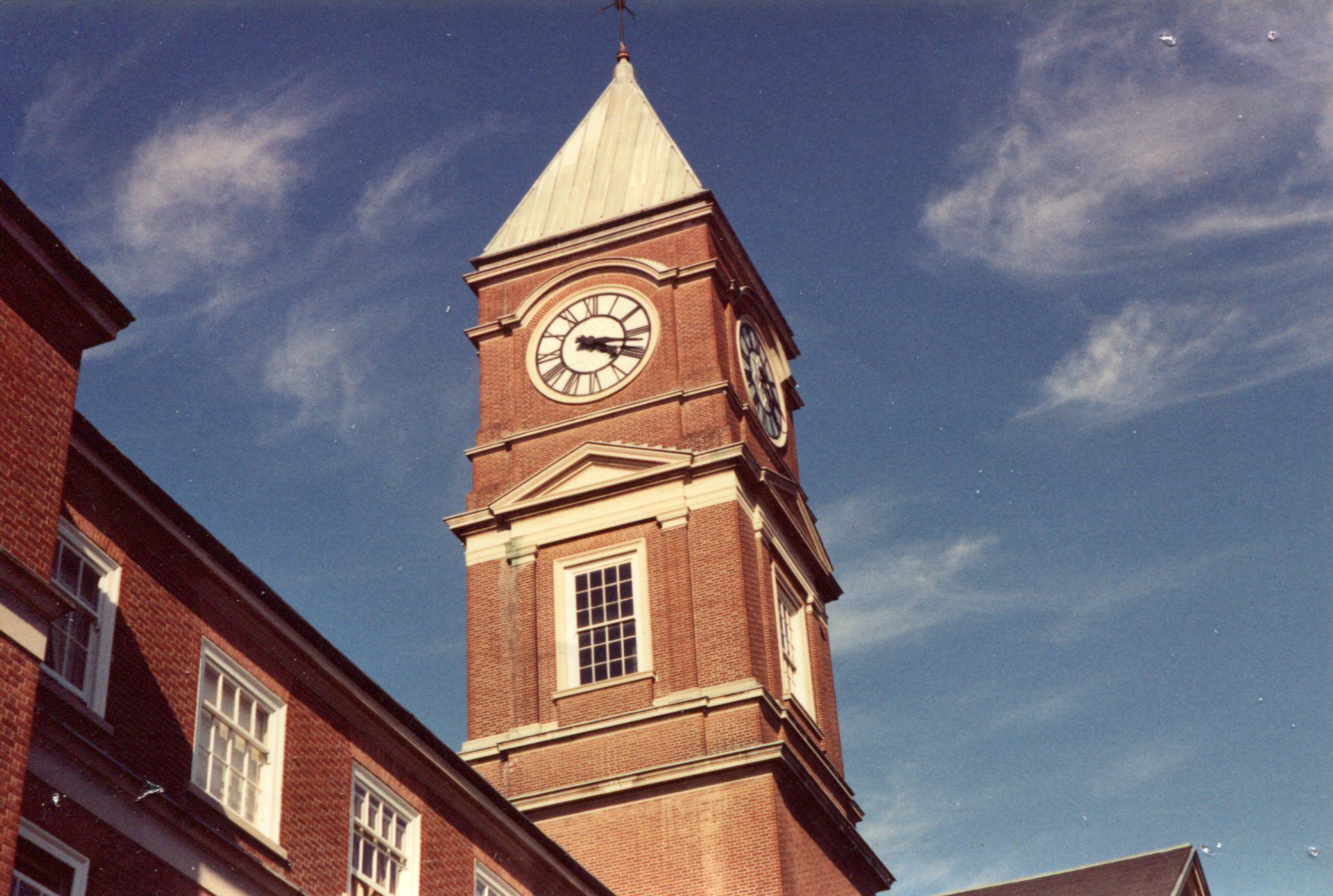
Contributions provided by Ted Rogers and his family during the late 1950s paid for the school's clock tower

In 1958, UCC faced a major crisis when it was discovered that the Upper School's main building was in danger of collapse due to poor construction. At the time, despite its benefactors, UCC had no endowment. An emergency building fund was started and, with the assistance of Prince Philip, all of the necessary $3,200,000 was raised. Ted Rogers and his family paid for the clock tower, while Robert Laidlaw donated the funds necessary to build Laidlaw Hall. Construction of the present main building began in early 1959, and it was opened by former governor general Vincent Massey near the end of 1960.

The crisis forced the school government to rethink their stance on foresight and planning, leading to a years-long program of new construction, salary improvements, and funding sources. Furthermore, in conjunction with Principal Sowby, whom he had helped select, Massey had additional influence on the college and brought about somewhat of a renaissance at the school – a number of distinguished visitors were brought in, and leading minds were hired as masters. At this time, the curriculum began to shift from offering a classical education to offering one grounded in the liberal arts; language options besides Latin were first offered after 1950.

The period from 1965 to 1975 was a decade of constant change at UCC; global and local cultural influences (including the Vietnam War, the bohemian Yorkville neighbourhood, the Woodstock festival, changing fashion trends, rock music, and the Watergate scandal) collided head-on with the conservative and traditional culture and environment at UCC. Individual freedoms trumped institutional discipline, and moral authority had lost its clout. Patrick T. Johnson, principal from 1965 to 1974, managed the cultural transition during these years, successfully integrating societal trends, traditional values, and individual self-expression. One of the casualties, though, was the cadet corps; it was disbanded in September 1975 in favour of a smaller volunteer corps. Under principals educated at Oxford (Johnson) and Cambridge (Sadlier), the college refused to adopt the new provincial educational standards issued in 1967, which it considered lower than the old standards. UCC also moved forward with new educational and athletic facilities across the campus, while opening the campus to the wider community at the same time. By the 1990s, summer camps were set up on the campus for any child who wished to enroll.

The college embarked on another building campaign, again with the aid of Prince Philip, beginning in 1989 and ending in 1994, with the construction of new athletic facilities at the Upper School and the replacement of the 1901 Peacock Building at the Prep. Two years later, UCC adopted the International Baccalaureate (IB), which augmented the Ontario Secondary School Diploma. Following this, Grade Two was added in 1998 and Grade One the next year. Since 2003, UCC has offered places from Senior Kindergarten to Grade Twelve.

=== 21st century ===
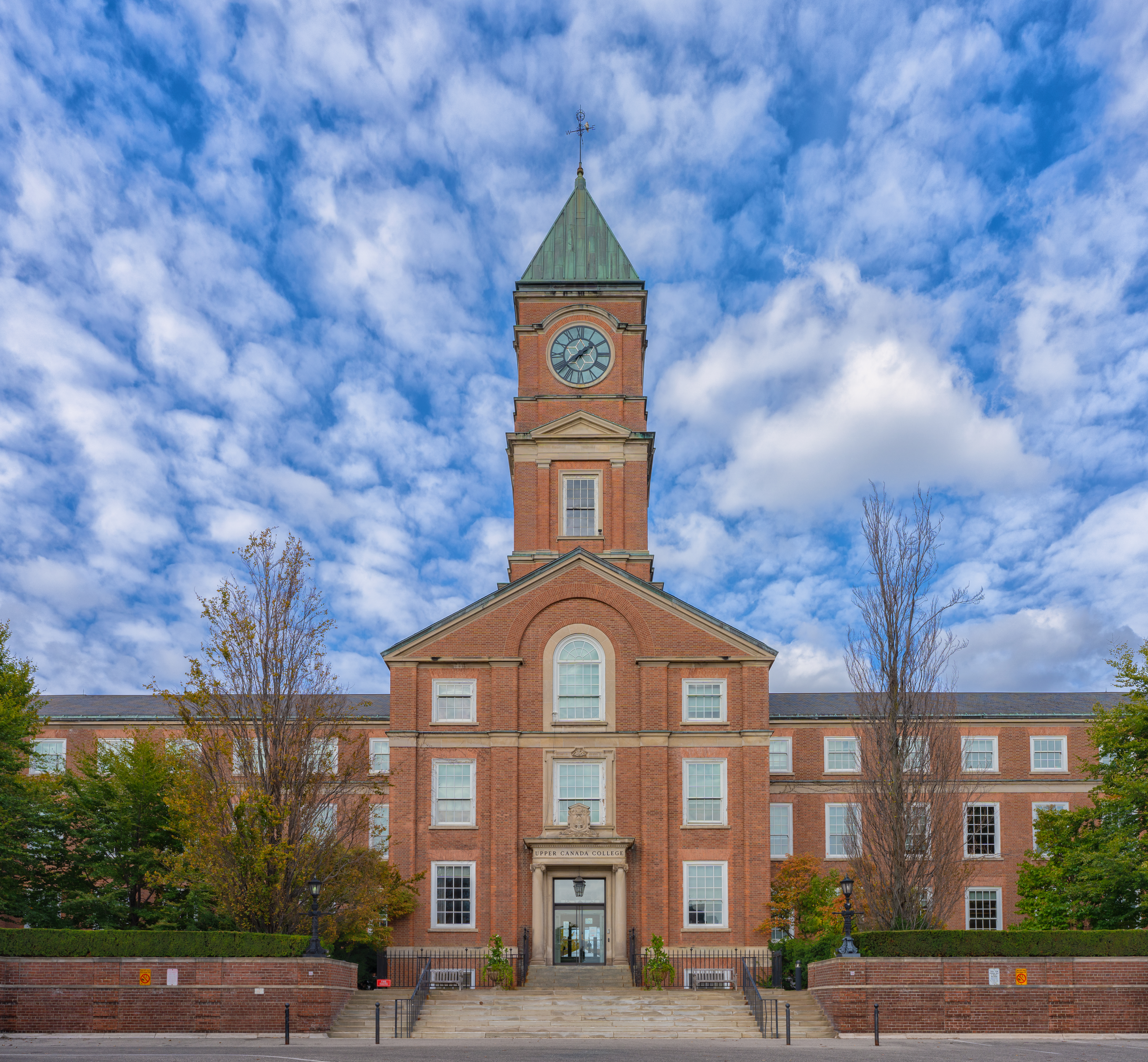
The Upper School's main building

UCC followed the trends in environmentalism when the Board of Governors unanimously voted in 2002 to establish the Green School initiative, wherein environmental education would become "one of the four hallmarks of a UCC education." Plans to carry this out saw not only upgrades of the school's physical plant to meet environmentally sustainable standards, but also an integration of these new initiatives into the curriculum. After the appointment in 2004 of Jim Power as principal, the curriculum further evolved to address reports of wider, societal trends showing a rise in boys' behavioural problems and a decline in their educational performance. Simultaneously, UCC's status as an all-boys school found support following years of pressure to become co-educational, especially as other prominent, formerly all-boys schools in Ontario began to make the switch, such as Lakefield College School (1989), Appleby College (1991), and Trinity College School (1991).

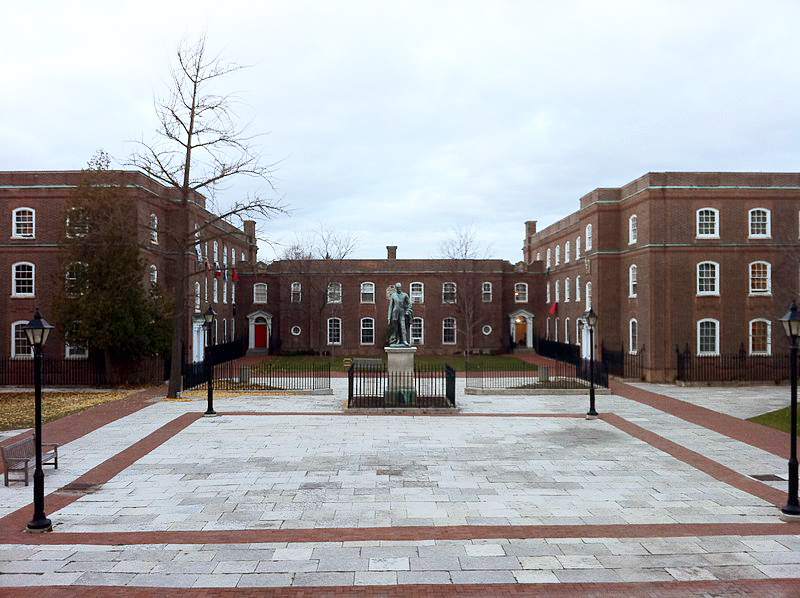
The Massey Quadrangle and the boarding houses – Wedd's at left and Seaton's at right, with residences for the housemasters in between

As part of the strategic plan for the school, the board of governors decided in 2007 to close the 180-year-old boarding programme, citing market changes and the neglect of boarding over preceding decades. However, students, the Old Boy community, and others associated with UCC reacted negatively to the announcement, leading the board to revisit its conclusion. It was subsequently decided that boarding should be retained, but only if, among other requirements, it housed no less than 60 students, the facilities were improved (work that took place through the summers of 2013 and 2014), and boarders be drawn from across the country.

==== Child pornography and sexual abuse cases ====
In the years following 1998, five UCC staff were accused of sexual abuse or of possessing child pornography; three were convicted of some of the charges. In 2003, 18 students launched a $62 million class-action lawsuit against UCC, claiming sexual abuse by Doug Brown, who taught at the Prep from 1975 to 1993 and was eventually found guilty in 2004 of nine counts of indecent assault. UCC agreed to a confidential settlement with the victims.

== Campus and facilities ==
=== Toronto campus ===
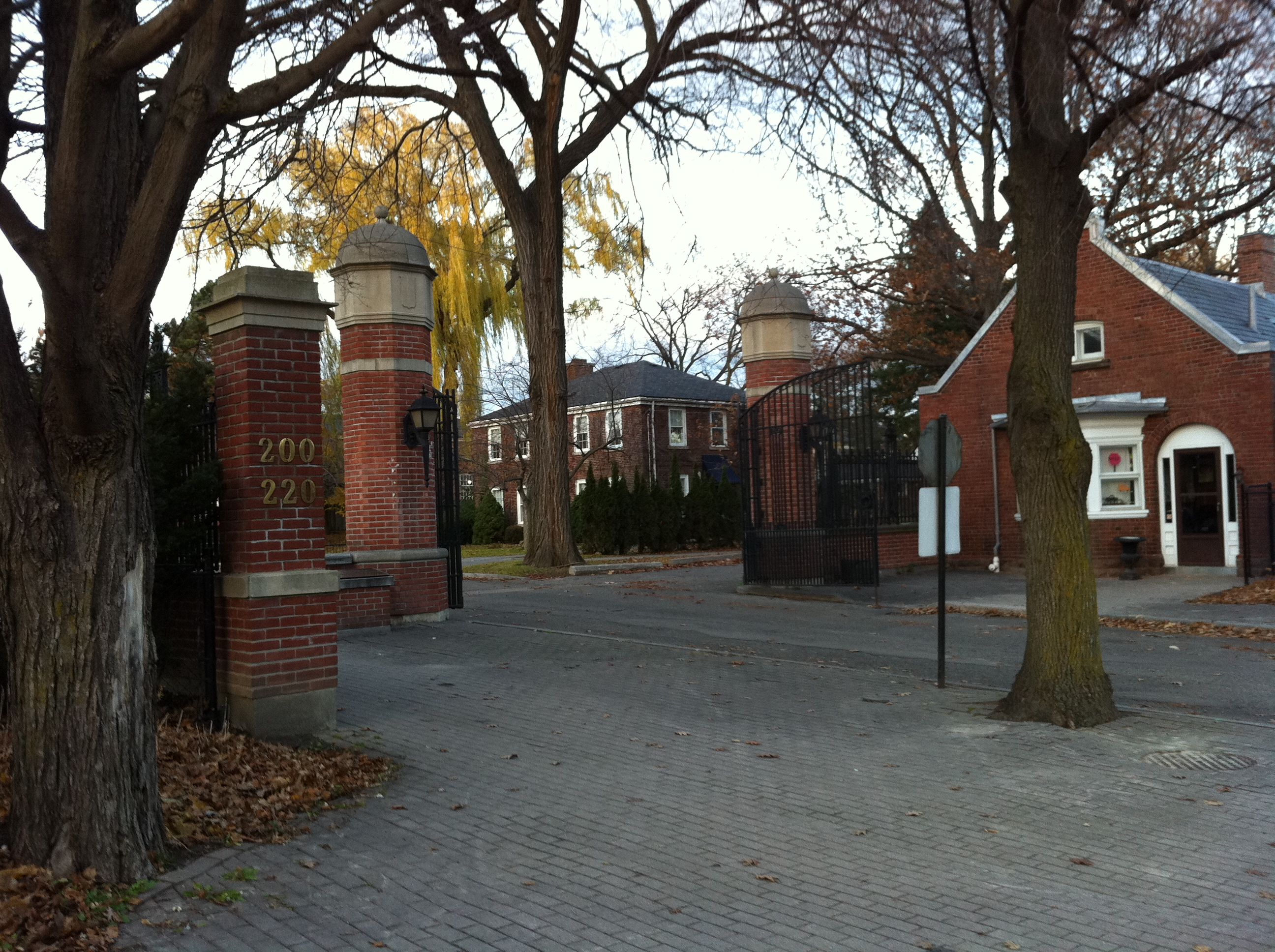
The main gates of Upper Canada College, at the head of Avenue Road

Upper Canada College occupies an open, 17 hectare (43 acre) campus in Deer Park, near the major intersection of Avenue Road and St. Clair Avenue, in the residential neighbourhood of Forest Hill. There are 15 buildings on the site:

The main structure (the Upper School), constructed between 1959 and 1960, central on the campus, and with a dominant clock tower, houses the secondary school component of the college, in a quadrangle form. Laidlaw Hall, the principal assembly hall, featuring a full theatre stage and a pipe organ, is attached to the west end of the Upper School and, at the other end, is the Memorial Wing, the school's main infirmary. Closing the north end of the main quadrangle (which is the location of the statue of the Lord Seaton, installed in 1934) is one building, built in 1932, that contains the two boarding houses, as well as two private residences for the associated boarding masters, adjacent to which is the school chapel, donated by Governor General Vincent Massey.

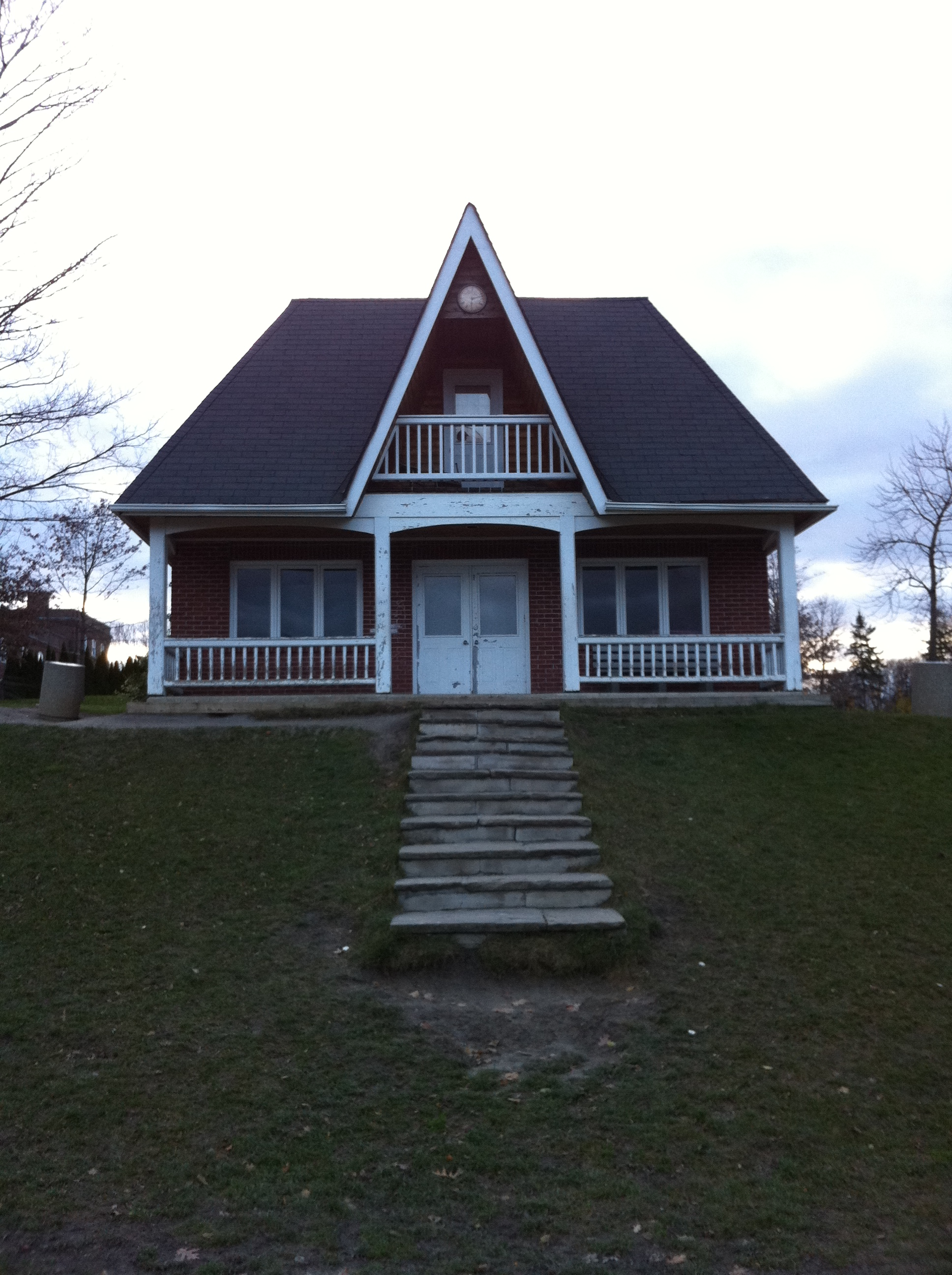
Rebanks-Sankar cricket pavilion

Satellite to this complex are townhouse-style residences for masters and their families; the residence of the college's principal, Grant House, built in 1917; and a small, two-storey cricket pavilion, inaugurated by Governor General Ramon Hnatyshyn. The Preparatory School, part of which was designed by Eden Smith, is at the south-west corner of the campus, near which is a home for the Prep headmaster and a small gatehouse.

The athletic facilities include an indoor pool and three gymnasiums, as well as, around the campus, the William P. Wilder sports complex (containing an NHL and an Olympic sized hockey rink, one of only four in Ontario), a sports activity bubble, tennis courts, a sports court, a running track, and nine regulation sized sports fields. The two major fields of the Upper School are called Commons and Lords, after, respectively, the British House of Commons and House of Lords, and one of the main central fields is known as the Oval (covered in winter by a bubble).

The Ontario Heritage Trust, a non-profit agency of the Ontario Ministry of Culture, erected three plaques outlining UCC's presence and history in Toronto. One is on the north-east corner of 20 Duncan Street (the only existing building from the college's original campus), the second at the south-east corner of 212 King Street West, and one at the main entrance of the current campus at 200 Lonsdale Road. (An additional plaque that mentions Upper Canada College stands in Clarence Square, commemorating Alexander Dunn, an Old Boy who received Canada's first Victoria Cross.)

=== Norval campus ===
Upper Canada College owns and maintains an outdoor educational facility near the town of Norval, Ontario, on 420 acres (170 ha) of property on the Credit River. The land was used by First Nations as camping and hunting grounds and Wendat (Huron) and Haudenosaunee travelled along the Credit to Lake Ontario to trade with Europeans. By the early 19th century, the land supported farming; many remnants of this use remain, including apple orchards and artifacts, some of which were unearthed by students during simulated archaeological digs.

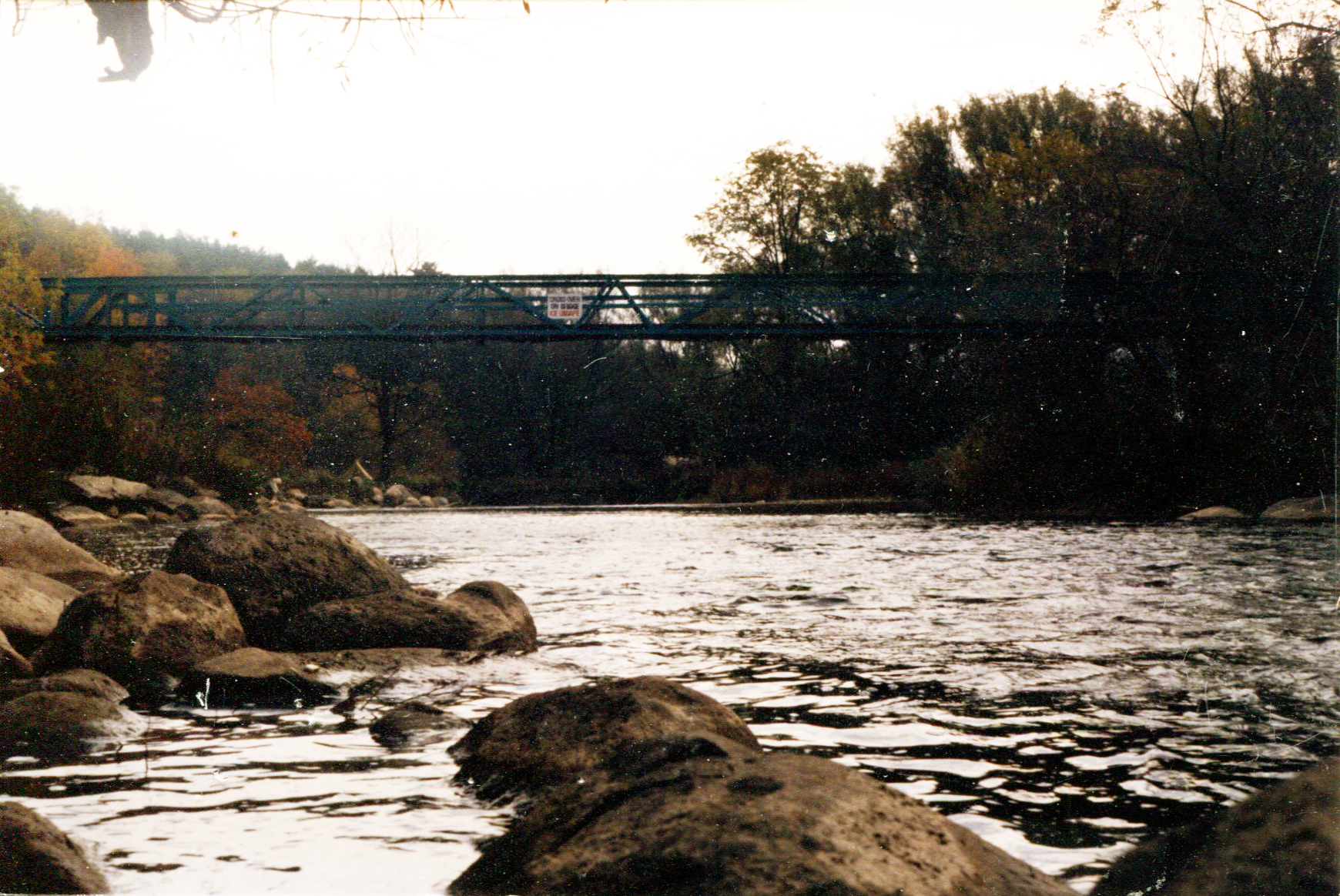
The Littlejohn Bridge over the Credit River as it passes through UCC's Norval property

Norval's main purpose is to teach college students about the natural environment, sustainability, and ecosystems through outdoor learning programs, some in conjunction with Outward Bound Canada. It is staffed by five full-time teachers, a superintendent, and cooks and housekeepers. Throughout the school year, entire classes, houses, or portions of certain grades will have a several day stay at Norval and other Ontario schools use the property and its facilities during the weeks when UCC students are not in residence. Norval also hosts an open house each season, with the spring Maple Madness focusing on the site's traditional maple syrup manufacturing, as well as cross-country skiing in winter and pumpkin carving in the autumn.

The land was purchased in 1913 at a time when the city of Toronto was quickly growing around the college's Deer Park campus and the trustees were considering moving the school to a new location. The 500 acres of land had been purchased by miller Robert Noble in 1868 and managed by his son Dr. Robert Noble Jr. Plans for buildings were drawn up by an architectural firm. However, due to the outbreak of the First World War and then the depression, the move was fully abandoned in the 1930s. The college first attempted to sell the land in 1928 and again in 1935, but found no buyers. Eventually, the property was developed into an outdoor education centre for UCC students and community. Beginning in 1913, an annual picnic was held at Norval, the first being catered by the King Edward Hotel. As the land had originally been cleared for agricultural use, much of the site was open field until over 700,000 seedlings were planted by staff and students through the 1940s, followed by the creation of an arboretum in 1962. The first bunk house was built in the 1930s and augmented in 1967 by another, larger residence and dining building known as Stephen House, which won a Massey Medal for excellence in architecture for the designer, Blake Millar. Stephen House contains a classroom and laboratory, in addition to the residential spaces for students and staff. There is also a bungalow-style residence for the property caretaker and in 2003 several log cabins were built for writing retreats.

Into the 2000s, the school came under criticism for keeping the entirety of the increasingly taxed Norval property while so little of it was actually used; this argument has gained increased credence in light of the consistent yearly tuition hikes and mounting legal costs. Despite repeated assertions that the college had no intention of selling the property, citing not only rapidly increasing land value, but also an intention to hold it to prevent industrial development on land that contains a variety of wildlife, including spotted deer and hares, UCC sold a small portion of the acreage in 2007 to help cover costs related to the 2003 class action lawsuit brought against the school by former students. In 2011, the Norval Long-Range Planning Committee recommended that Norval's facilities should be expanded to allow for more overnight students and co-educational use.

=== Waterfront facility ===
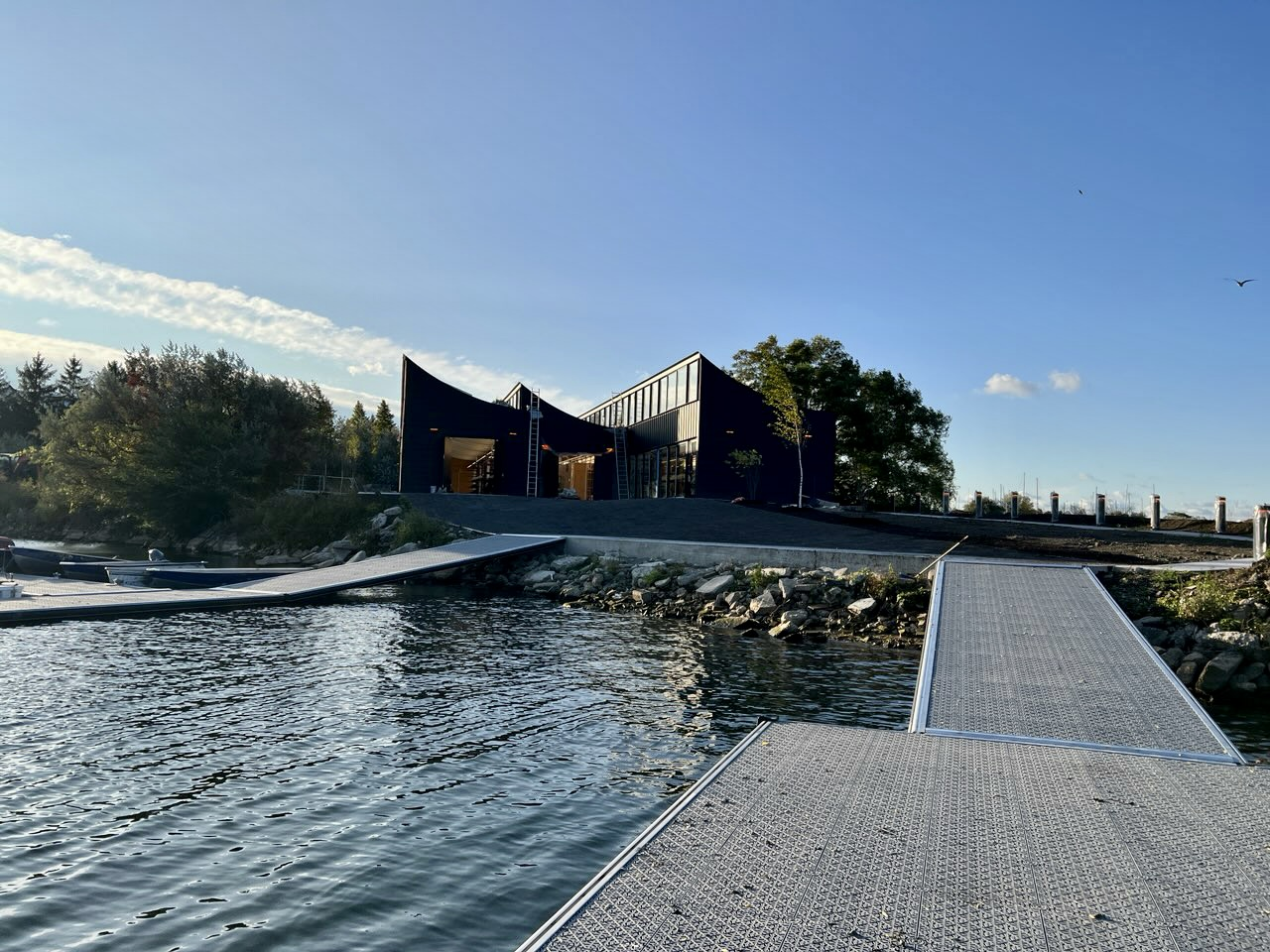
Don Lindsay Boathouse in 2023

Upper Canada College has a waterfront site that is located beside Lake Ontario at Toronto's Outer Harbour Marina. Occupied by the Don Lindsay Boathouse, the site primarily serves UCC's rowing team, which trains out of the facility during the spring and fall seasons. When not in use by the school's rowing program, the facility becomes a community rowing centre, hosting UCC's summer camps and Horizon program.

== Tuition, scholarships, and assets ==
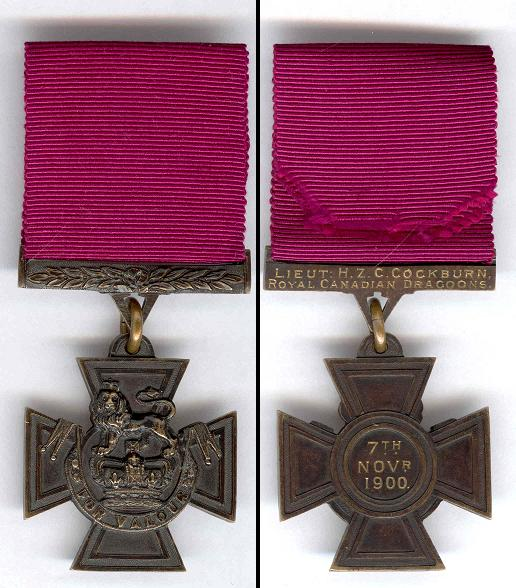
The Victoria Cross awarded in 1900 and presented in 1901 by Prince George, Duke of York (later George V), to UCC Old Boy Hampden Cockburn and in UCC's possession, though on permanent loan to the Canadian War Museum

Upper Canada College has an endowment of more than CA$100 million. For the 2020–2021 school year, tuition fees range from $34,135 to $37,135 (not including a $8,500 initial registration fee, books and uniform) for day students and $61,085 to $66,835 for boarders (not including a $5,000 initial registration fee). An additional $500 technology fee is levied on all students in the Upper School, which covers the costs of a MacBook Air laptop computer, the associated software, and technological support. According to the school, fewer than two per cent of the Canadian population can afford the full cost of attending the school. The institution has strict admissions standards, accepting approximately 20 per cent of all applicants for the 2018–2019 school year. The college began a fundraising campaign in 2012 to obtain $100 million for scholarships; a donation of $11 million was received from Stu Lang, the largest single gift in Canadian independent school history. To honour Lang's donation, UCC created the scholars Lang Scholar Program to recognize up to 15 student-athletes annually with extraordinary leadership potential. UCC disbursed over $5.0 million in financial aid in 2019 to approximately 20 per cent of students. Only students in grade five and above are eligible for this assistance.

Besides its own archives containing records that outline the history of Upper Canada, the province of Ontario, and the city of Toronto dating back to the mid-19th century, the college also has a notable collection of artwork, antiques, and war medals. This includes the Order of Canada insignia presented to Robertson Davies, Foster Hewitt, Charles Band, and Arnold Smith, plus Canada's first Victoria Cross, awarded in 1854 to Old Boy Alexander Roberts Dunn, and the Victoria Cross given, and ceremonial sword belonging, to Hampden Cockburn; the valour medals were given to the Canadian War Museum on permanent loan on 17 May 2006. In the college's chapel, itself decorated with works by Canadian artists, is an altar made of marble from parts of St. Paul's Cathedral, in London, England, that were damaged in the Blitz and donated by Dean of St. Paul's Walter Robert Matthews. On this is an altar cloth made from a piece of that which was used for the coronation of Queen Elizabeth II. Held is an American flag that flew atop one of the World Trade Center towers in New York City. Further, the school holds works by Thoreau MacDonald and a collection of original paintings from the Group of Seven (though several were auctioned by the college in an effort to pay for the lawsuits it faced in 2004); an original Stephen Leacock essay, titled Why Boys Leave Home—A Talk on Camping, donated in 2005 and published for the first time in The Globe and Mail; and the original manuscript of Robertson Davies' work The Mask of Aesop, which he wrote in 1952 specifically for the Prep's 50th anniversary. Also in UCC's possession is a chair owned by Sir John A. Macdonald and another that once belonged to George Airey Kirkpatrick.

== Governance, faculty, and staff ==
Upper Canada College is incorporated under an act of the Legislative Assembly of Ontario and administered by a 17-member Board of Governors as a public trust, with the current chair of the board being Russ Higgins, a principal of MacPherson Builders ltd. Somerset Entertainment. The board, whose members are appointed and elected from alumni, parents of students past and present, and the wider UCC community, selects the college's principal, who serves for five years, managing the school's annual operation and heading an executive committee composed of vice-principals, department heads, and administration staff. There are also a number of other committees for advancement, finance and audit, governance and nominating, human resources, long range planning, property, and senior management review. Additionally, the UCC Foundation, a registered charity in Ontario since 1962 and run by a board of trustees, manages the school's endowment. Honorary trustees include David R. Beatty, John Craig Eaton II, Hans Michael Jebsen, Michael MacMillan, Kelly and Michael Meighen, Richard M. Thomson, Galen Weston, and Michael Wilson.

There are 129 faculty members in total, of whom 12 possess doctorates, 40 hold master's degrees, and 20 per cent are International Baccalaureate examiners. 17 faculty members reside on the campus. The student-to-teacher ratio is 18:1 in the lower grades and 19:1 in the upper grades.

=== Visitor ===
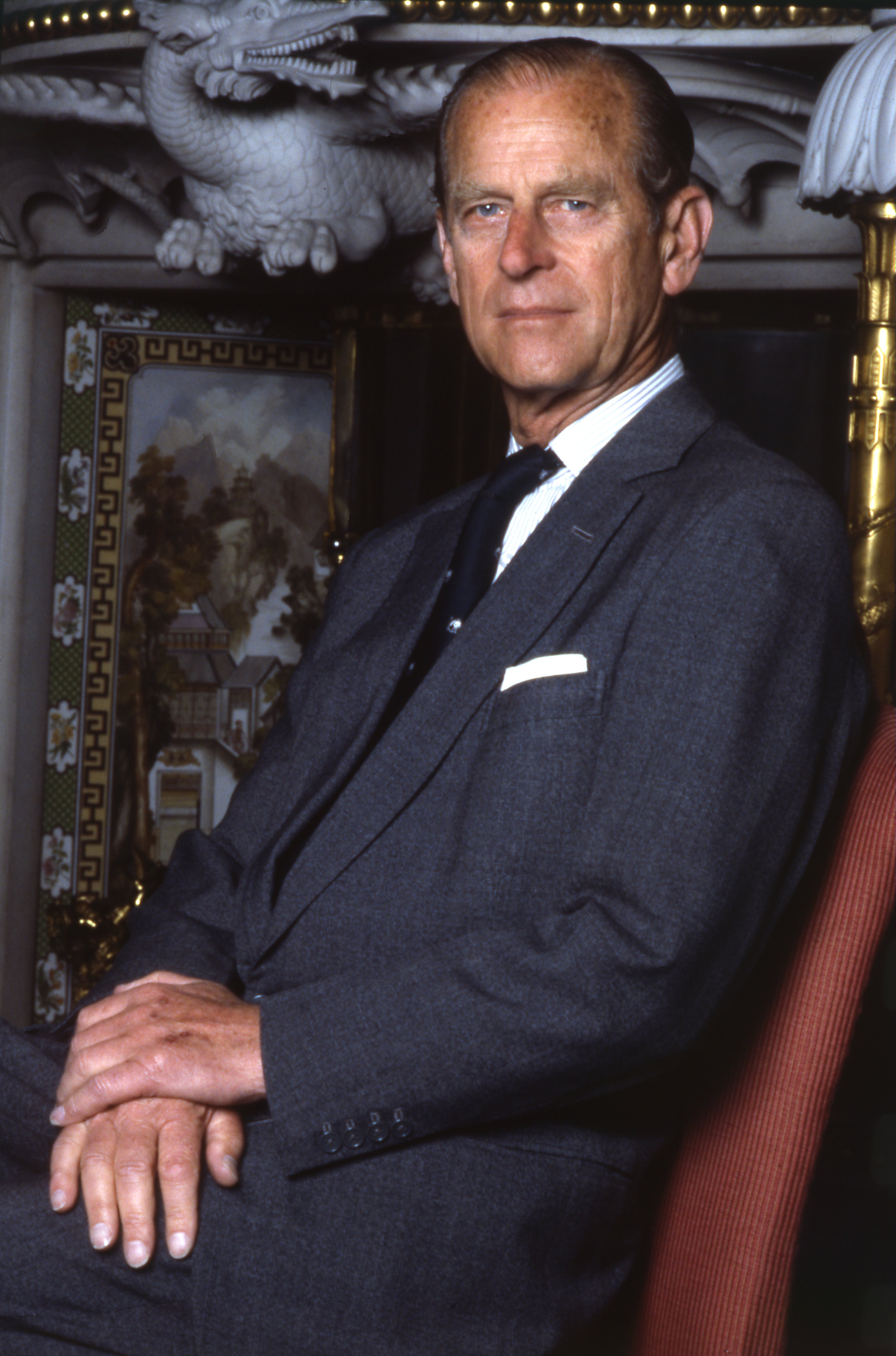
Prince Philip, Duke of Edinburgh, UCC's visitor from 1955 until his death in 2021

The visitor of Upper Canada College is a ceremonial role within UCC's governmental structure, though the occupant has the right or responsibility of inspecting and reporting on the College.

Sir John Colborne served informally as UCC's first visitor. When the post was created in 1833, the Bishop of York was named as the occupant, ex officio. Four years later, an act of the Upper Canada legislature outlined that the visitors of UCC would be the judges of His Majesty's Court of King's Bench. The role was then transferred in 1850 to the governor general of the Province of Canada, on behalf of Queen Victoria, until Confederation, after which the lieutenant governor of Ontario acted as visitor. However, it was later felt the provincial viceroy was associated too much to politics and the office of visitor was not mentioned in the 1901 act that altered the government of UCC.

Prince Edward, Prince of Wales (later Edward VIII and then Duke of Windsor), was in 1920 appointed as Upper Canada College's official visitor, at the Prince's request. The College Times wrote then:

It will be a great pleasure to all to hear that the HRH the Prince of Wales has expressed a wish to be given the fine old English title of visitor of this school. HRH met so many 'Old Boys' while [fighting in the First World War] that, when he made his visit to Canada last year, he instituted special inquiries about the previous history of the College. Finding that the title existed, he has thus honored us by becoming 'Visitor of Upper Canada College' [...] The gracious offer of the Prince places the position on a still higher plane and it makes us all feel a lot prouder of the grand old College to which we belong.

Edward was removed from the post of visitor when he abdicated the Canadian throne in 1936. The office thereafter lay dormant until 1955. Maintaining a connection with the Canadian royal family, Prince Philip, Duke of Edinburgh (husband of Edward VIII's niece, Queen Elizabeth II), was appointed as visitor of UCC, a role in which he served until his death in 2021, making him the longest-acting visitor in the College's history. He visited the college five times (in 1959, 1969, 1979, 1989, and 1993), aided two fundraising campaigns, and gave items to the school, including a signed cricket bat.

During his 1959 visit to the school, Philip was made an honorary Old Boy and unveiled the permanent display of his personal coat of arms in the Massey Quadrangle. To celebrate the 150th anniversary of the College's founding, the Prince made a two-day visit to UCC, which included a reception and formal banquet Exhibition Place and distributing prizes to the winners of the first annual Jubilee Association Run. Historian Richard Howard said of Philip in 1979, "In the lengthy history of the College, no visitor since our inception has taken such a deep interest in our affairs, for such an extended period, as has the present distinguished incumbent.”

In May 2012, the Upper Canada College Monarchist League conducted a poll and submitted to the Board of Governors a report outlining how 71 per cent of students surveyed (91 per cent of those in Year One) approved of another member of the royal family serving as UCC's visitor upon the resignation or demise of the Duke of Edinburgh. It was recommended that the next person to occupy the post be non-partisan and of a young age, so as to be likely to serve for a number of decades, as the Duke of Edinburgh had done. The most widely supported figure was Prince William, Duke of Cambridge (now the Prince of Wales).

== Student body ==
UCC is a non-denominational school with approximately 1,000-day students and 88 boarders; Senior Kindergarten to Grade Seven students, approximately 400 boys, attend the Preparatory School (the Prep), after which a boy may move on to the Upper School, which consists of Grades Eight to Twelve. The Upper School years are known as follows:

- Grade Eight: Year Eight (formerly called Year One)
- Grade Nine: Year Nine (formerly called Year Two)
- Grade Ten: Year Ten (formerly called Foundation Year)
- Grade Eleven: Year Eleven (formerly called IB1)
- Grade Twelve: Year Twelve (formerly called IB2)

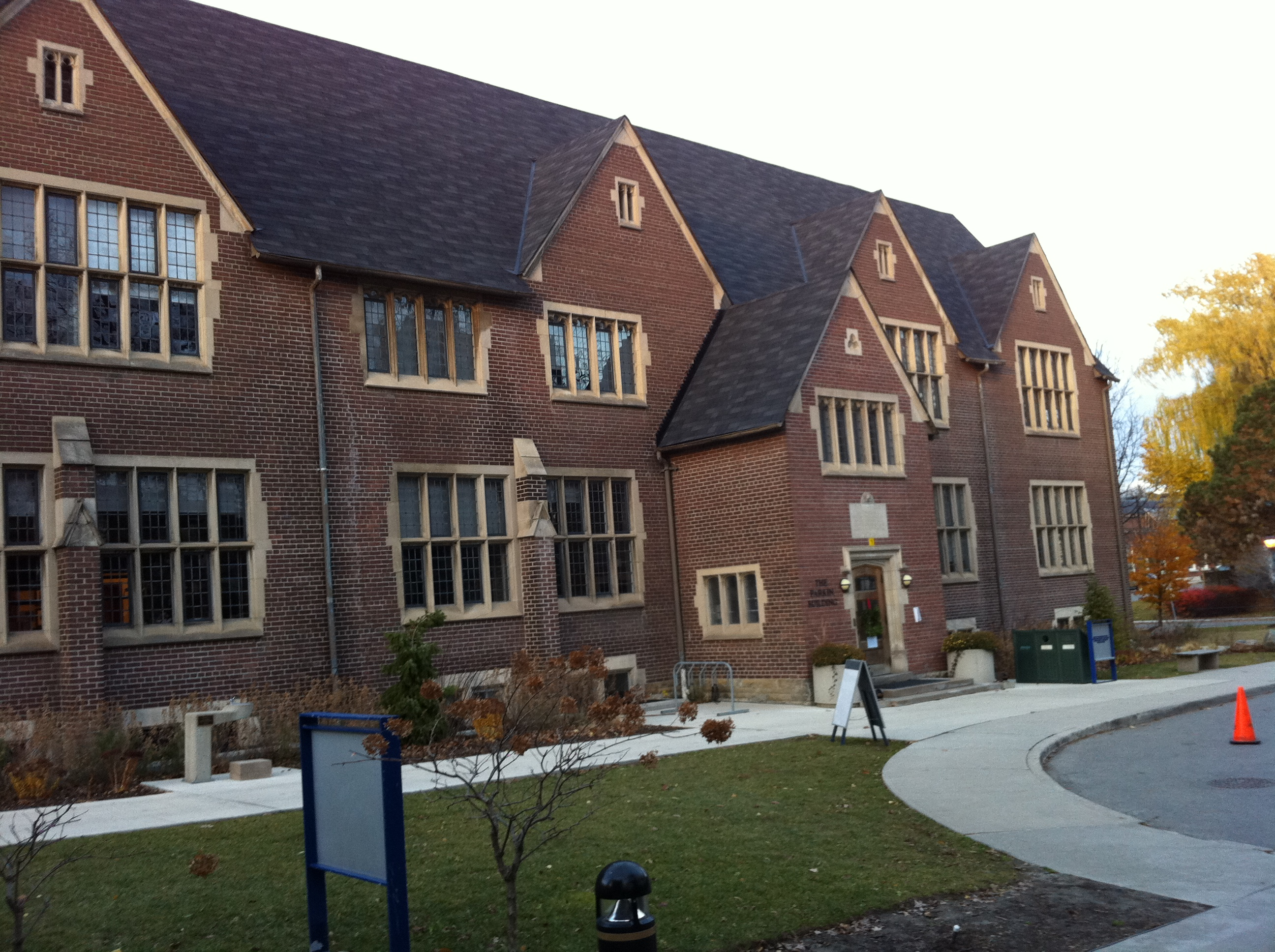
The Parkin Building, part of the Prep School, which houses Kindergarten through Grade Seven

While Prep students are divided into forms, UCC, like several other schools in the Commonwealth of Nations, divides its Upper School students into houses. The house system was first adopted in 1923, consisting of only four houses until the late 1930s, after which the number increased the present ten. Eight of these—Bremner's, Howard's, Jackson's, Martland's, McHugh's, Mowbray's, Orr's, and Scadding's—are for day students and the remaining two—Seaton's and Wedd's—are for boarders. The houses compete in an annual intramural competition for the Prefects' Cup and the boarders also take part in weekend events and trips with boarders from neighbouring girls' schools.

Martland's was named for John "Gentle" Martland, a master at the College who was most well known for his reform of the boarding houses, making them into something more than simple residences. He toned down the rigid study regimes, cold dormitories, bland menus, and bullying, fostering instead more tolerating discipline, swift punishment for serious offenders, the occasional feast, and organised recreation. Wedd's is the one the oldest of the ten houses at UCC and is named for William Wedd, formerly first classical master.

The school's student government, created in 1892 and known as the Board of Stewards, represents the students at events, such as Association Day and Winterfest, and relays their wishes, during times of change or concern, to the upper administration. The group comprises 19 elected members of the Leaving Class: one steward for each house (the heads of houses) plus nine—the Head Steward and eight stewards with portfolio—chosen by the majority of the whole student body. In addition to the stewards, students can enter the prefects program, requiring them to show leadership through their senior years to be awarded the title of Prefect upon graduation, the highest recognition UCC offers "for citizenship and leadership."

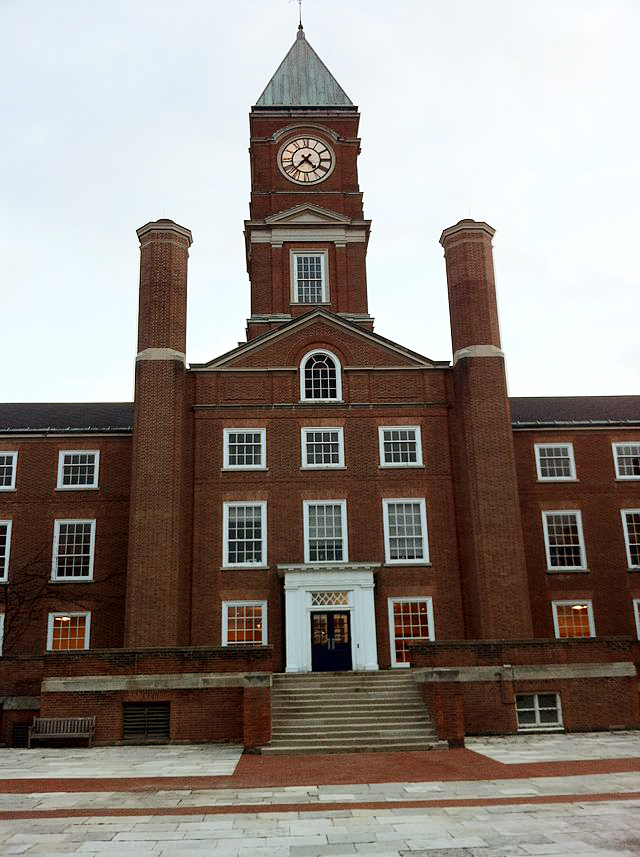
The Upper School building from inside the Massey Quadrangle; at centre are the Prince of Wales doors, once reserved for the exclusive use of stewards

Though Upper Canada College has accepted ethnic minorities since the first black student (Peter Gallego, the son of a former American slave) enrolled in 1831 and First Nations boys, such as Francis Assikinack (son of the Ojibwe leader Jean-Baptiste Assiginack) in 1840, their representation within the student body was initially disproportionate to the same within the city's population and the school developed a reputation as a "WASP bastion". Michael Ignatieff considered the school's ethnic makeup during his time there, between 1959 and 1965, reflective of the culture of Toronto in general; according to him, "basically Tory, Anglican and fantastically patrician." Peter C. Newman, who attended UCC a decade before Ignatieff, and himself Jewish, said antisemitism was "virtually non-existent." According to school historian Richard Howard, UCC transformed its culture during the 1970s, as it began to offer assistance to the less affluent and made attempts to attract boys from visible minorities, becoming what he called "a small United Nations" that echoed Toronto's emerging ethnic variety (today, students from over 20 different countries and regions attend UCC), though, as recently as 1990, there were references in College Times editorials to antisemitism and sexism. These aspects of college life came to light in 1994, through James T. Fitzgerald's book Old Boys, which published some alumni's recollections of the school. In it, Peter Dalglish noted that while the student body was more racially diverse, it was still predominantly populated by the upper middle class, with the Asian students being even wealthier than their white counterparts. The college took the criticisms seriously, hiring Dalglish to help open UCC to the broader community. The decision to reverse the 2007 plan to eliminate boarding was made in part because of boarding's inherent ability to allow students from around the world to attend UCC. The college's expansion of financial aid beginning in 2012 was intended to socioeconomically diversify the student body.

== Curriculum ==
Upper Canada College educates boys from Senior Kindergarten through to Grade Twelve. Graduates receive both the Ontario Secondary School Diploma and the International Baccalaureate (IB) diploma; UCC adopted the IB program in 1996 and the entire curriculum is today guided by the non-governmental organization. French, language, mathematics, science, outdoor education, physical education, the arts, and more are covered during a boy's years in the Prep School and, once boys move to the Upper School in Year One (Grade Eight), they begin university preparation through a liberal arts program. The courseload includes mathematics, history, geography, science, English, second languages, civics, design, film and the dramatic, visual, and musical arts, as well as computer science. Aiding both student and teachers is the Wernham West Centre for Learning, the most comprehensive and endowed secondary school learning facility in Canada. Created in 2002 as a department pertaining to the refinement of academic skills and assisting the students with learning disabilities, its primary focus is to facilitate improved learning skills and abilities, as well as accommodate for students with particular learning disabilities.

== Reputation and rankings ==
The college has been described as Canada's most prestigious preparatory school.

== Extracurricular activities ==
Participation in extracurricular activities is encouraged at Upper Canada College; all students are required to complete 40 hours of Community Service as a part of their Ontario Secondary School Diploma as well as complete 150 hours of other extracurricular commitments, with an equal division between arts, athletics, and community service (what the IB calls CAS: creativity, action, service), prior to graduation.

=== Arts and athletics ===
Upper Canada College runs a variety of extracurricular theatre programs, ranging in scope and scale, from musicals to Shakespeare, with at least one large-scale and one small-scale production each year. Smaller, student written and run plays are also produced. The theatre program, which includes all aspects of production, is run in conjunction with Bishop Strachan School, a nearby girls' private school. Various bands and music groups that practice extra-curricularly are also supported by the college, including a wind ensemble, concert band, stage band, string ensemble, jazz ensemble, and singers. These groups compete in festivals at different levels and also organize fundraising concerts.

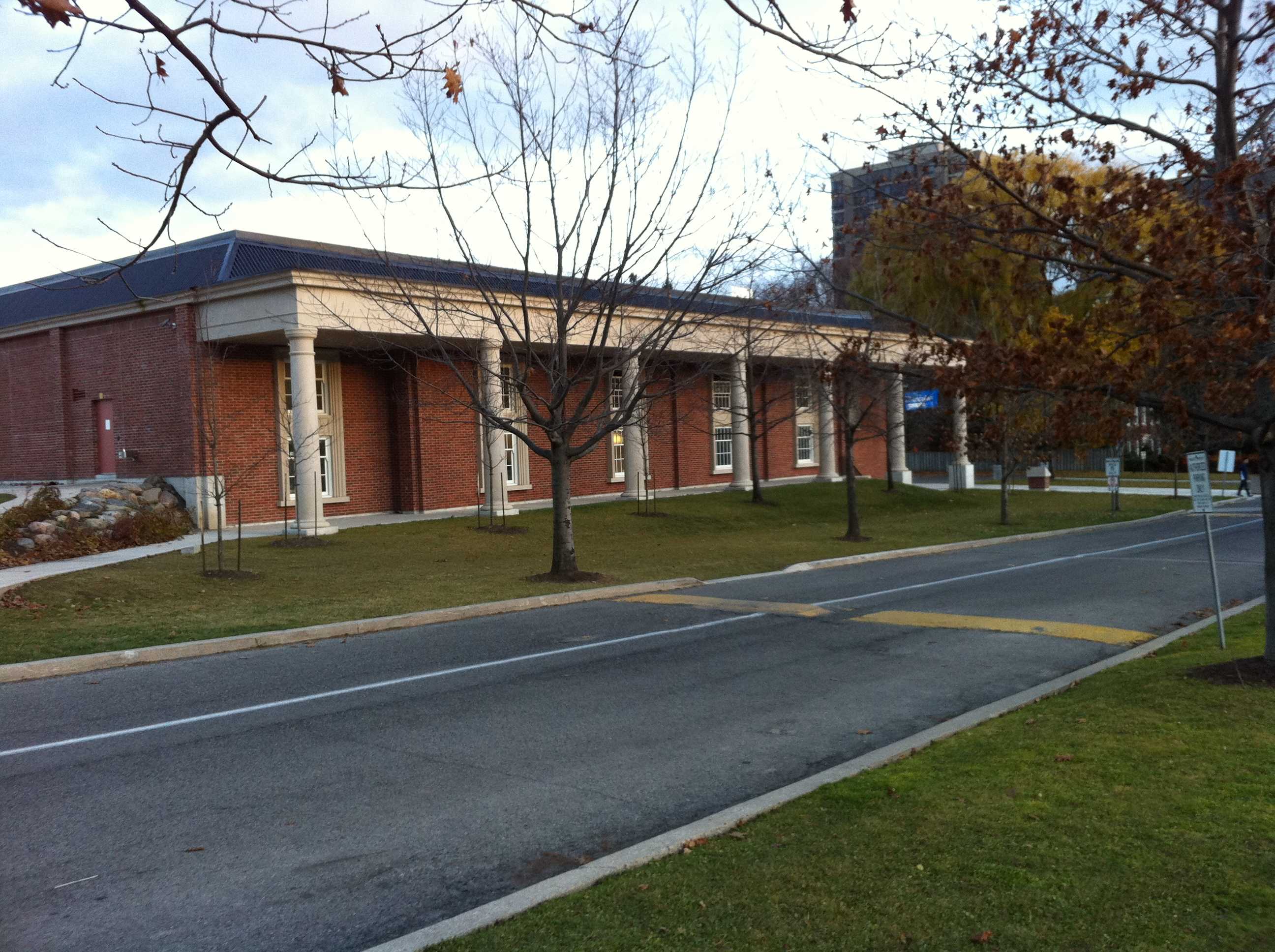
The William P. Wilder Sports Complex, an arena housing one NHL and one Olympic sized hockey rink

Sports teams run by UCC include alpine ski, baseball, basketball, cricket, football, golf, hockey, rowing, rugby, lacrosse, soccer, squash, Swimming, Track and Field, tennis, and volleyball. Some teams are purely intramural, but 45 interscholastic teams compete in the CISAA and OFSAA and regularly place high in the standings at national and international competitions, such as the Head of the Charles Regatta.

=== Programs ===
The World Affairs Conference is Canada's oldest student run conference, begun in 1983 and organized in conjunction with Branksome Hall since the late 1980s. Held annually, the Conference has reached over 4,000 students, 25 countries, and 65 schools around the world. Past speakers have included Mehdi Hasan, Ralph Nader, Stephen Lewis, Michael Ignatieff, Susan Faludi, Gwynne Dyer, Thomas Homer-Dixon, Geoffrey Hinton, Roberta Bondar, Masai Ujiri, Francisco Salgasti, Esko Aho, Edward Snowden, and Martin Luther King III, all of whom have spoken on a variety of topics including human rights, gender issues, justice, globalization, and health ethics.

In conjunction with other schools, UCC ran the Ontario Model Parliament (OMP), a simulation of a provincial parliament that started in 1986, when it was founded by UCC teacher Paul Bennett, and was composed of two events: an Elections Day at UCC, followed by a three-day simulation that took place in the legislative chamber at the Legislative Assembly of Ontario. UCC students made up the entirety of the Executive Committee that organizes and runs the model parliament, however 200 students from high schools around the province participated.

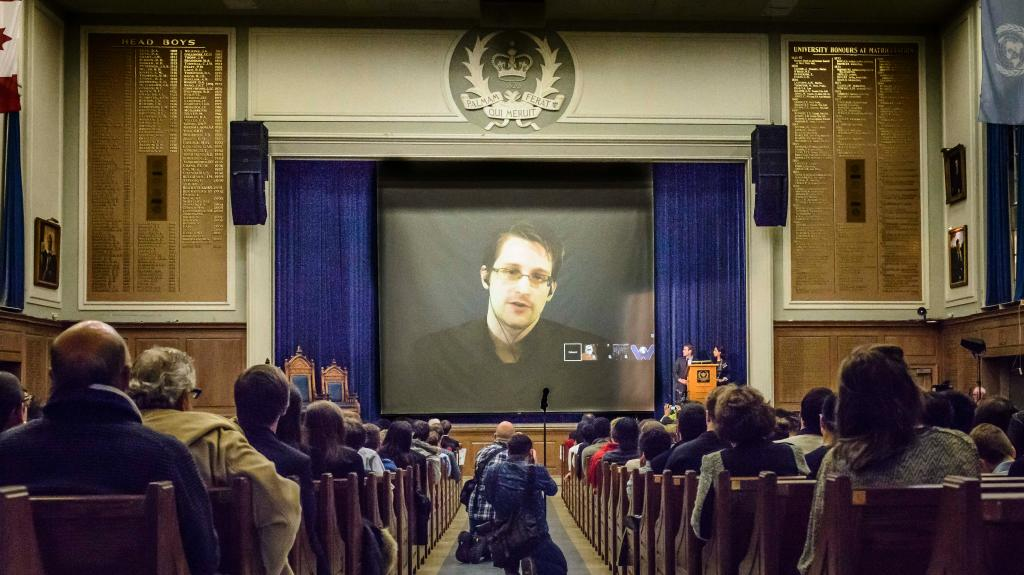
Edward Snowden speaking to students at the 2015 World Affairs Conference, a student-run conference at UCC.

The UCC Green School is an environmental organization composed of student, teachers, and faculty, through which UCC has planted and maintained an educational organic garden, reduced landfill waste and water consumption, and implemented a program of purchasing renewable resources for renovations. The Green School has won awards from the City of Toronto and the National Audubon Society.

=== Media ===
The College maintains and administers its own publishing company, the UCC Press, which produces all school publications.

The College Times is UCC's yearbook and is the oldest school publication in Canada, having been issued without fail since it was founded by John Ross Robertson, then a student at UCC, in September 1857. The first editions were written by Robertson and fellow pupils and printed on presses at The Globe, the predecessor newspaper of the present The Globe and Mail. Past editors include Robertson Davies, Michael Ignatieff, and Stephen Leacock.

Serials for the student body include The Blazer, the college humour newspaper; Quiddity, the school's annual arts and literature publication, which showcases students' creative work; The Blue Page, a one-page weekly publication of letters to the editor expressing opinions on any relevant issue; and Convergence, the school's award-winning student newspaper.

=== Community service ===
Upper Canada College encourages students to engage in voluntary community service. In relation to this, the college runs the Horizons program, in which local underprivileged children are tutored in music, digital media, and academics twice a week by current UCC students. Further, each year, usually for two to four weeks during Spring Break, UCC also organises trips for 15 to 20 of its Upper School students to various developing countries where they take part in community building services such as constructing schools, wells and homes, or aiding in conservation work. Students have ventured to places like Venezuela, El Salvador, Kenya, and China.

=== Events ===
Every year the school plans and runs several on or off-site events, some of which are open only to students in certain years, while others to the entire student population, alumni, and their respective friends and family. These events are intended to serve a variety of purposes—promoting school spirit, for enjoyment, fund raising or philanthropic causes—and many are organized by the Upper Canada College Association, with the help of parent and student volunteers.

Association Day is analogous to UCC's homecoming. Held since 1979, A-Day, as it is informally known, constitutes the school's largest annual event, taking place over the last weekend of September and culminating on the Saturday with a large festival, including competitive matches for all fall sports teams and the Association Dinner for Old Boys celebrating their five-year incremental class reunions. Later in the academic year is the Founder's Dinner, a formal event that has been held for more than a century. It typically takes place on the Thursday night before the third weekend in January, which is made a special long weekend for students as a commemoration of Sir John Colborne's birthday. Another regular event is the UCC Gala, a black tie dinner and silent auction organized every three or four years in May.

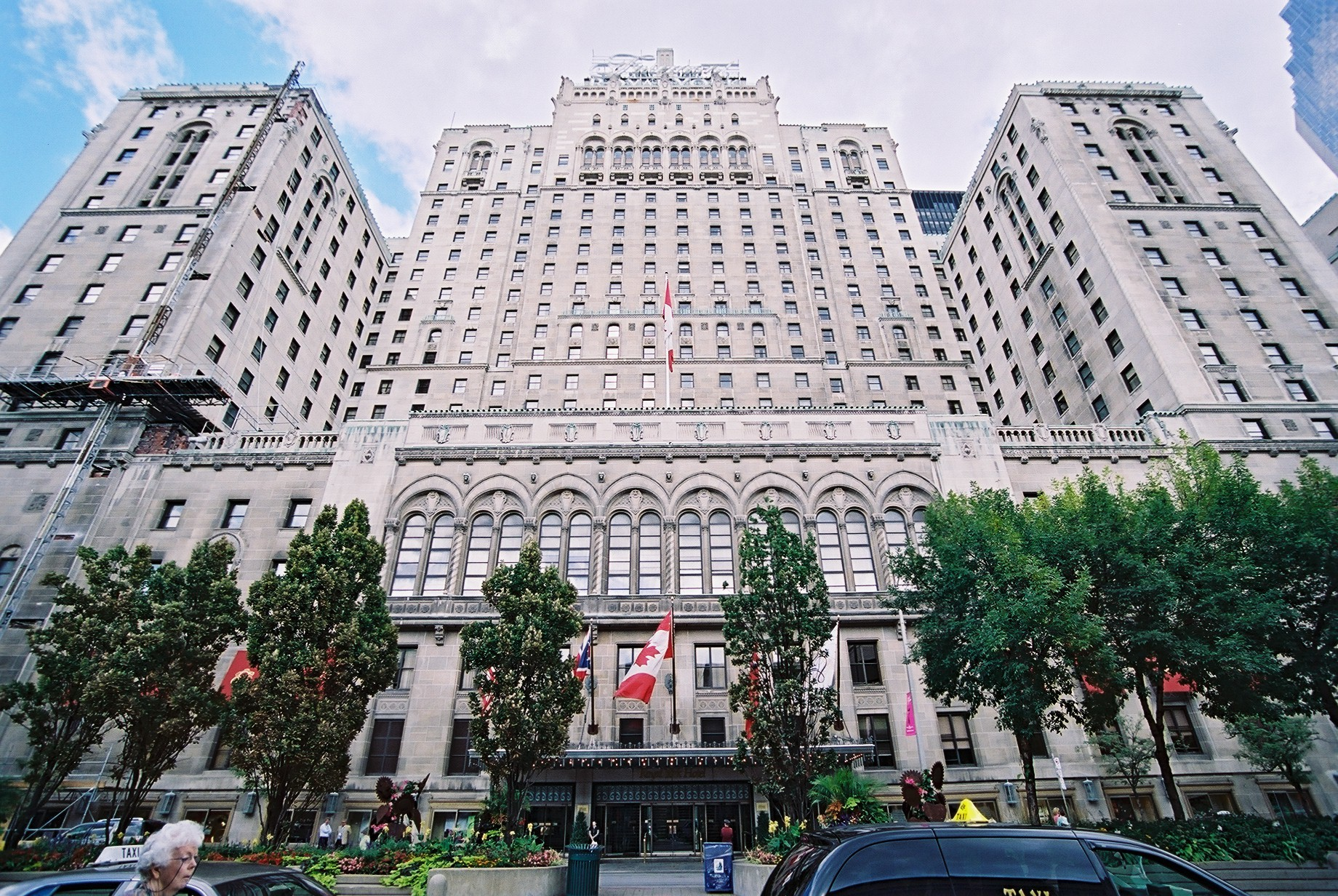
The Royal York Hotel, frequently the location of the Battalion Ball

Two secondary school student dances take place in the calendar year: The Battalion Ball originated out of the At Home, a UCC community-wide event similar to a modern homecoming and first held in 1887. The revival of the UCC Rifle Corps in 1891 resulted in students attending the At Home in their cadet uniforms and, by 1897, a dance was added to the festivities in the evening, known as the Rifle Corps Dance. By 1931, the dance became the Battalion Ball, after the Rifle Corps was renamed the UCC Cadet Battalion, and, in 1971, the colloquial nickname The Batt was devised, which later developed into "Batt Ball". The event was held off-campus for the first time in 1975, at the Royal York Hotel, and, after 1976, when the Cadet Corps was disbanded, school uniforms replaced military attire, rock bands played, and Batt Ball became more of a spring prom. Today, Batt Ball is reserved for students in grades 11 and 12, held at venues such as the Royal York Hotel or Arcadian Court, with attire being tuxedo for boys and evening gown or cocktail dress for girls, and music is provided by DJs.

Various sporting events occur annually: Hockey Night has been held by the college since 1933 as an evening where the First Hockey team would play a feature game against one of UCC's rival schools in competition for the Foster Hewitt Victory Trophy. The game was held at Maple Leaf Gardens, thanks to the generosity of the arena's builder, Conn Smythe, and its (as well as the then Toronto Maple Leafs) owner, Harold Ballard, both themselves Old Boys. After the closing of The Gardens in 2000, the event was moved to the Air Canada Centre and then the Ricoh Coliseum. Over the decades other games were added to the roster, including a game involving the school's Junior Varsity team, the final game of the house hockey tournament, and a game between Havergal College and Bishop Strachan School. By the early 1990s, pleasure skating and Prep School games had been added to the evening's schedule. Further, the Terry Fox Run is one of Upper Canada College's most successful events; the school is an official site for the run, acting as the start and end point, as well as part of the course, which ventures throughout Toronto's Belt-Line. UCC's Terry Fox Run is also the largest site and has raised the most money in the world since 2000.

== Affiliations ==
Upper Canada College is a member of the Conference of Independent Schools of Ontario (CIS), the Canadian Accredited Independent Schools (CAIS), the Secondary School Admission Test (SSAT) Board, the G30 Schools, the Association of Boarding Schools (TABS) and an associate member of the National Association of Independent Schools (NAIS), the International Boys' Schools Coalition (IBSC), the Toronto Boys' School Coalition (TBSC), and the college principal is a member of the Headmasters' and Headmistresses' Conference (HMC) in the UK. Along with St. Andrew's College, Ridley College, and Trinity College School, UCC also remains one of the Little Big Four, an athletic association of Ontario independent boys' schools established in the 19th century.

Bishop Strachan School (BSS) is located only two blocks from UCC, it is UCC's sister school. UCC students work on joint projects with students of other nearby girls' schools, including BSS, St. Clement's School, Havergal College, and Branksome Hall.

The school had, between 2008 and 2009, a relationship with an Ontario Junior Hockey League team, the Upper Canada Hockey Club, though the team and the school were not directly affiliated. Upper Canada College is also a member of the Ontario Tennis Association.

== People ==
=== Alumni ===
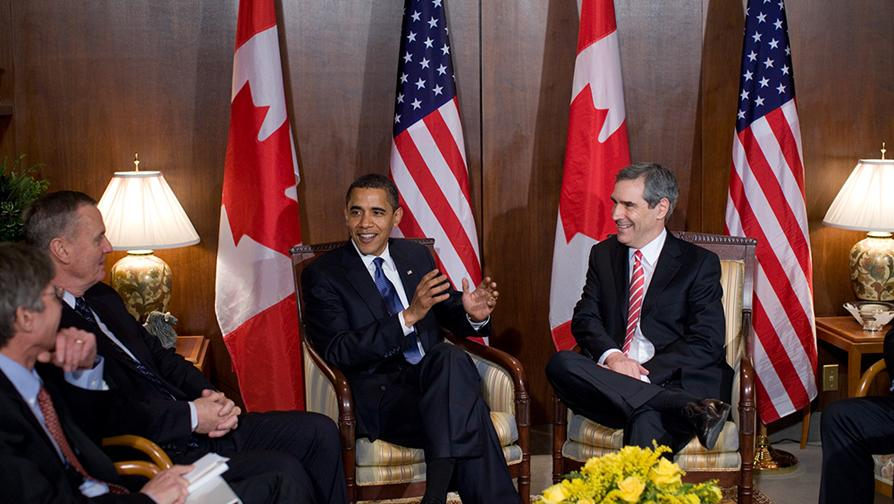
UCC Old Boy and then Leader of Her Majesty's Loyal Opposition Michael Ignatieff (right) meeting with President of the United States Barack Obama (centre), 2009

The college states that almost every UCC graduate, known as an Old Boy, goes on to post-secondary schooling. There are over 6,000 alumni worldwide. UCC has a reputation for educating many prominent and notable graduates.

The school has produced 26 Rhodes Scholars and five Loran Scholars. Six graduates became lieutenant governors, four were appointed as premiers, seven as chief justices, and four were elected as Mayor of Toronto. At least 18 Old Boys have been appointed to the Queen's/King's Privy Council for Canada and 18 were made Queen's/King's Counsel. Two were awarded the Victoria Cross, two were appointed to the Order of the Companions of Honour and three to the Royal Victorian Order, no less than 50 have been inducted into the Order of Canada since the honour's inception in 1967, 11 into the Order of Ontario, and at least 14 have been accepted as fellows of the Royal Society of Canada. Ten are Olympic medallists and eight have played in the National Hockey League.

=== Faculty ===
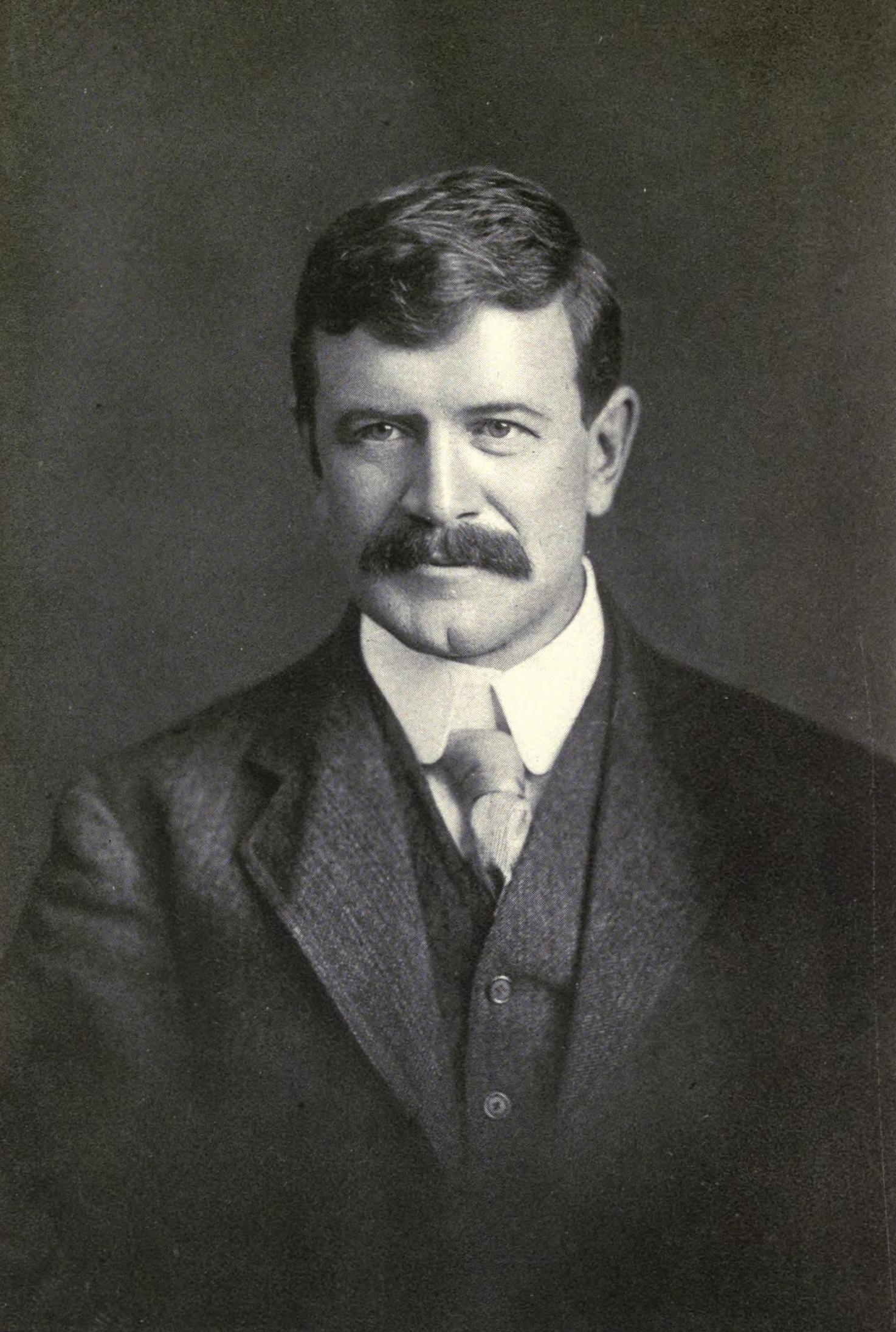
Stephen Leacock, who taught at Upper Canada College in the late 1800s

Notable faculty members of Upper Canada College have included:

- George Anthony Barber, Toronto's first school superintendent and founder of the Toronto Cricket Club
- Michael Barrett, physician and proponent and first dean of the Ontario Medical College for Women (later Women's College Hospital)
- John Colapinto, New Yorker staff writer, author of As Nature Made Him
- Robertson Davies, author
- Mike Eben, Hec Crighton Trophy recipient, three-time all-star wide receiver in the CFL, and radio and television narrator
- David Gilmour, author and broadcast journalist
- Rev. Dr. Charles Gordon, author
- Robert Sympson Jameson, Chief Justice of Dominica and Upper Canada, member of the Legislative Assembly of Upper Canada, Speaker of the Legislative Council of the Province of Canada, and chief superintendent of Education
- Stephen Leacock (1915—1925), most widely read English-speaking humourist in the world
- J.P.M.B. "Jock" de Marbois, appointee to the Légion d'honneur and Commodore of the Royal Navy and Royal Canadian Navy
- John McCaul, theologian, second president of U of T, and president of the Canadian Institute (later the Royal Canadian Institute)
- George Robert Parkin, leader of the Imperial Federation League and first secretary of the Rhodes Scholarship
- Edward Robert Peacock, Receiver General to the Duchy of Cornwall and the director of the Bank of England
- Henry Scadding, Canadian intellectual
- Goldwyn Smith, British historian and founding professor at Cornell University, administered exams in classics at UCC
- Arthur Sweatman, Archbishop of Toronto and Primate of the Anglican Church of Canada
- Arnold Walter, Austrian musician, founder of the Canadian Opera Company, and director of music at U of T

=== UCC Association ===
The Upper Canada College Old Boys' Association is a non-profit organization established in 1891, on the day of the closure of the college's Russell Square campus. The name was changed in 1969 to the Upper Canada College Association, when the association expanded its mandate to include parents, faculty, staff and friends of the college in matters relating to UCC, such as governance and advancement. Specific programs are also run by the association, including those that permit recent graduates to volunteer as mentors to students, and Old Boy reunions are set up around the world by the association's fifteen branches outside of Toronto: Calgary, Halifax, Kingston, London, Montreal, Ottawa, and Vancouver in Canada; Boston, Los Angeles, New York City, and San Francisco in the United States; London in the United Kingdom; Hong Kong in China; and Budapest in Hungary.

A 29-person board of directors, referred to as the Association Council, meets three times a year to discuss matters facing the college and plan association events; 21 of those on the council are elected by members of the association at its annual meeting, while the remaining eight are ex officio.

== Arms, motto, and emblem ==
UCC's emblem from 1916 to 1931

Upper Canada College's motto is palmam qui meruit ferat (Latin for 'let he who merited the palm bear it'), which was derived from a poem by John Jortin titled Ad Ventos—ante A.D. MDCCXXVII (Latin for 'To the Winds—Before AD 1727'). The words, attached to the arms of Lord Nelson in 1797, were first used in relation to UCC in 1833, as part of an emblem stamped on the inside of books given as prizes, showing the phrase written on a ribbon tying together two laurel leaves around the school's name. Around 1850, a crown replaced the school's name; John Ross Robertson stated this was at the insistence of Henry Scadding, who argued in favour of its use because the school had both been founded by a lieutenant governor and was at first a royal grammar school. The crown originally used was that of King George IV.

In 1889, Scadding produced the design for an emblem which can still be seen over the doors to Laidlaw Hall at the college's Upper School. L.C. Kerslake described this emblem in 1956:

The small wreath, crossed anchor and sword in the centre of the crest are found in Lord Nelson's coat of arms.

The open book in the upper left corner is symbolic of education which is the primary function of any school. The quadrant-shaped figure in the upper right corner is a section of the standard of St. George and signifies the school's connection with England and Great Britain, the native land of the founder, Lord Seaton.
Technically speaking, the crown should not be included in the crest, as the school was not instituted by royal charter. However, loyalty to the Crown is one of the fundamental traditions of UCC and is certain to endure as long as the school itself.

The cornua copiae just above the motto stands for the fullness of school life which is one of the distinctive marks of UCC.

This complex design, known as Scadding's Device, which was just the Seal of Upper Canada as authorised in 1820 with the college's motto and palm branches applied, was never widely used. Instead, the simple crown between laurel leaves tied with a ribbon bearing the school's motto became the standard emblem, although its appearance changed over time in reflection of current tastes.

It was not until the mid-1970s, as the college approached its sesquicentennial, that consideration was given to having the emblem authorised by the College of Arms (Canada's heraldic authority at that time). The Armorial Bearings Committee was established to oversee the project, and a petition was submitted to the Earl Marshal in 1981. The Board of Governors insisted that the school's traditional emblem be incorporated into the forthcoming achievement; however, as the emblem includes a royal crown, it was necessary to obtain the Canadian monarch's personal permission to use it officially. This was done via the Lieutenant Governor of Ontario, then John Black Aird (himself a UCC Old Boy), and Queen Elizabeth II consented to the request, making UCC the only institution of its kind in the Commonwealth of Nations to have the royal crown in its arms.

The letters patent granting UCC its heraldic standard (top left), arms (centre left), and badge (lower left)

The letters patent granting UCC its armorial devices, including a heraldic standard, were issued on 4 January 1985, the 155th anniversary of the college's first day of classes. The traditional emblem became the school's official badge. However, as text and numbers are normally not included in such badges, the motto was omitted, but the King of Arms made an exception to the rules by allowing the retention of the date 1829. The emblem also became the crest of the school's new arms, although without the number 1829, since heraldic rules dictate that the royal crown must sit directly on the helmet.

The escutcheon of the arms shows two deer's heads in the chief (one being the crest of the arms of the founder, Lord Seaton, and the other taken from the arms of Bishop John Strachan, the first chairman of the board of governors) while, below a line of division embattled as in Lord Seaton's arms, is the aforementioned Scadding's Device surmounted by another royal crown. The shield is supported by a master in academic gown (on the left) and a student in cricket uniform (on the right), both styled as figures from the mid-19th century. These armorial devices were registered with the Canadian Heraldic Authority in 2005.

== In media ==
In the 2006 film Bon Cop, Bad Cop, the main character of Martin Ward (Colm Feore) is a graduate of Upper Canada College. The school is also mentioned in Michael Ondaatje's In the Skin of a Lion as an institution into which the wealthy in Rosedale, Toronto, wished to enroll their eldest sons.

UCC was a filming location for the 1993 movie Searching for Bobby Fischer and was the focus of episode eight of season nine of the Rogers Television show Structures.

== See also ==
- Education in Ontario
- List of Canadian organizations with royal patronage
- Lower Canada College
