= David R. Beatty =

Canadian businessman and academic

David R. Beatty CM OBE

Personal details
- Born: David Ross Beatty; 1942 (age 83–84) Toronto, Ontario, Canada

David Ross Beatty (born 1942) is a Canadian businessman and academic. He serves as a Director of FirstService, Walter Energy and Canada Steamship Lines. He is currently the Conway Director at the Rotman School of Management at the University of Toronto. Over his career he has served on over 35 Boards of directors and been Chair of 8 publicly traded companies.

== Early life ==
Born in Toronto, Ontario, he was educated at Upper Canada College, the University of Trinity College (B.A. 1965) in Political Science and Economics, and Queens' College, Cambridge (M.A. 1967) in economics.

== Career ==
Beatty is currently an adjunct professor at The Rotman School of Management at the University of Toronto and the Conway Director of the Clarkson Centre for Business Ethics and Board Effectiveness.

He has been a director of a variety of corporations including: Bank of Montreal, FirstService, Garbell Holdings Limited, Goldcorp, Inmet Mining, Thistle Mining, Canadian Securities Institute, Gardiner Group Capital, and Ivanhoé Cambridge Shopping Centres Limited.

== Honours ==
He is a Member of the Order of Canada and an Officer of the Order of the British Empire. He is honorary Consul-General of Papua New Guinea. Past Chairman Upper Canada College, Toronto. Past Director of the Art Gallery of Ontario & The George R. Gardiner Museum of Ceramic Arts
