= Francis Assikinack =

19th-century Ojibwe historian

Francis Assikinack (c. 1824–1863) was a 19th-century Ojibwe historian. Assikinack was born on Manitoulin Island. He was raised learning only Ojibwe and did not learn English until after enrolling at Upper Canada College in 1840. His father Jean-Baptiste Assiginack was a prominent leader of the Ojibwe.

Assikinack had tried to get approval to study medicine but the government did not support him in this course. Assikinack worked for the Canadian Indian department. For a time he taught school at Wikwemikong.

He wrote three essays on the customs and culture of the Ojibwe.

== Sources ==
- Leighton, Douglas (1976). "Assikinack, Francis". In Halpenny, Francess G. (ed.). Dictionary of Canadian Biography. Vol. IX (1861–1870) (online ed.). University of Toronto Press.
- MacLeod, D. Peter (2009). "The Anishinabeg Point of View: The History of the Great Lakes Region to 1800 in Nineteenth-Century Mississauga, Odawa, and Obijwa Historiography". In Susan Sleeper-Smith (ed.). Rethinking the Fur Trade: Cultures of Exchange in an Atlantic World. University of Nebraska Press. p. 47. ISBN 978-0-8032-4329-3.
