= Charles Band (businessman) =

Canadian businessman (1885–1969)

Charles Shaw Band
- Born: December 14, 1885; Thorold, Ontario, Canada
- Died: May 27, 1969 (aged 83)
- Occupation(s): Businessperson, art collector, and philanthropist
- Awards: Order of Canada

Charles Shaw Band, CC (December 14, 1885 – May 27, 1969) was a Canadian businessperson, art collector, and philanthropist.

Born in Thorold, Ontario, Band was educated at Toronto's Upper Canada College. He held executive positions in companies such as Canadian Surety Company, Goderich Elevator and Transit Co. Ltd., Manufacturers Life Insurance, Toronto General Trusts, and Gutta Percha and Rubber Limited.

In 1914, he married Helen Huntington Warren whose mother, Sarah Trumbull Van Lennep Warren, was a founder of the Art Gallery of Toronto (now called the Art Gallery of Ontario). Band was friends with members of the Group of Seven, including Lawren Harris and Fred Varley. He was president of the Art Gallery of Ontario from 1945 to 1948 and again from 1964 to 1965.

He was also involved with many community organizations including the Canadian Chamber of Commerce, the Canadian National Institute for the Blind, the John Howard Society, the Red Cross, the Art Gallery of Ontario (AGO), and the National Film Board of Canada.

In early 1969, he was made a Companion of the Order of Canada "for his services to the arts and the community".

He died in 1969 and his art collection, including the 1929 Emily Carr painting The Indian Church, was donated to the Art Gallery of Ontario.
