= Shift (magazine) =

Canadian magazine

- Editor-in-Chief: Neil Morton
- Former editors: Evan Solomon; Laas Turnbull
- Staff writers: Clive Thompson; John Turner
- Categories: Technology, Culture
- Frequency: Monthly; Bi-monthly (2001)
- Circulation: 150,000
- Publisher: Andrew Heintzman
- Founded: 1992
- First issue: July 1992
- Final issue: 2003
- Country: Canada
- Based in: Toronto, Ontario
- Language: English
- ISSN: 1188-973X

Shift was a Canadian magazine, devoted to technology and culture. It has now ceased publication as a print magazine. Its website continued to publish new content for at least a year after the print title was discontinued, but is no longer in operation. The magazine was based in Toronto, Ontario.

== History and profile ==
Shift was founded as a quarterly publication in 1992 by Evan Solomon and Andrew Heintzman. The first issue was published in July 1992. It was originally an arts and literary journal, but evolved into a technology magazine with a special focus on Internet culture in 1994. Articles by regular writer Clive Thompson focused on the culture and theory behind new media. In 1997 the magazine was acquired by Montreal-based company BHVR. Solomon left the magazine in 1999 to devote more time to his writing and broadcasting career.

In the late 1990s and the early 2000s, the magazine attempted to expand its American presence in order to compete with similar magazines such as Wired. In 2000 the magazine was sold to its staff and the founder Andrew Heintzman again became the president of Shift Multimedia. Although magazine started its edition in the USA, it eventually ceased publishing. A television show inspired by the magazine was also unsuccessful.
