= Montgomery County, Ohio =

County in Ohio, United States

- County
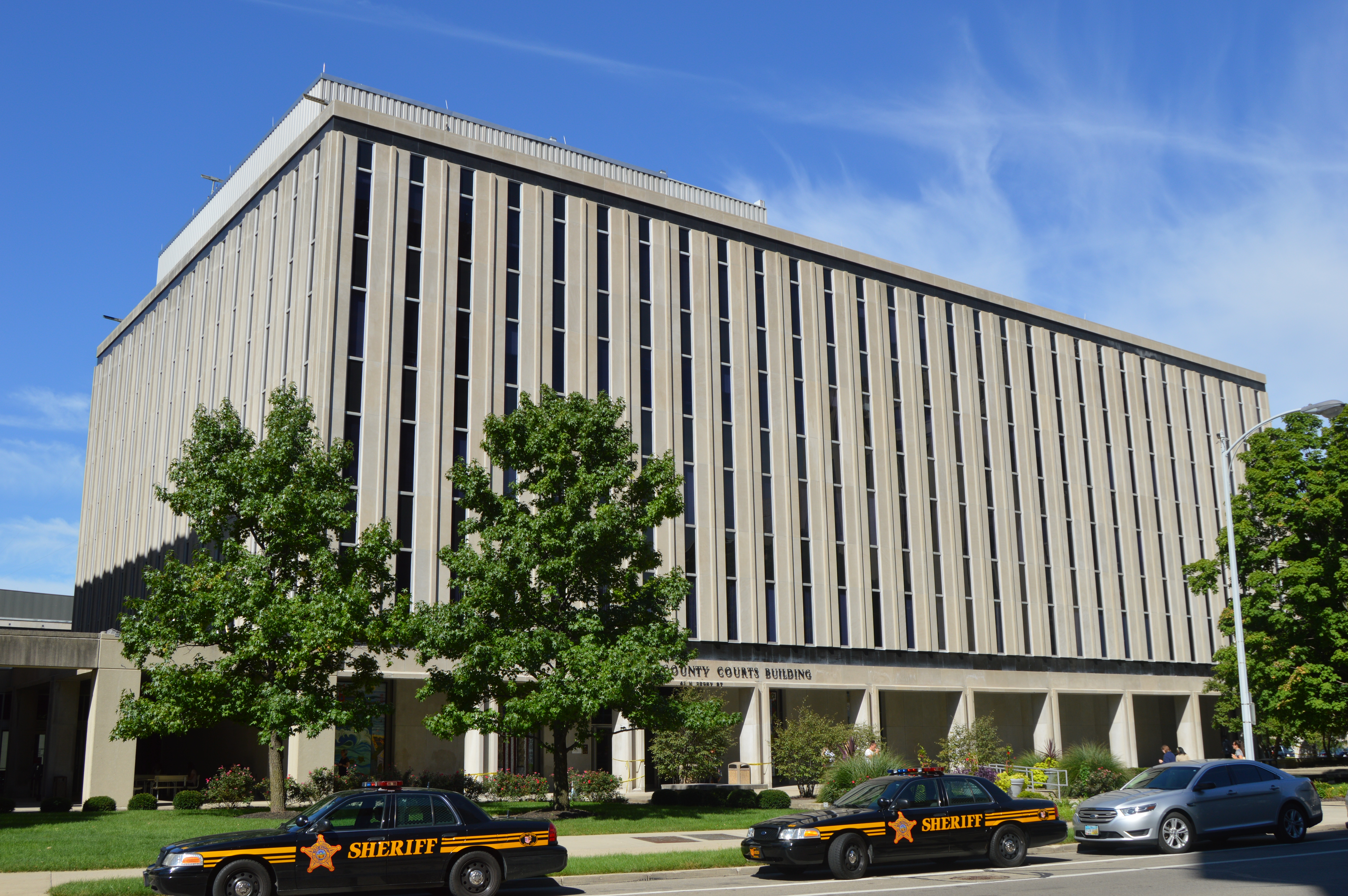
- Current Montgomery County Courthouse

- Flag Seal Logo

- Location within the U.S. state of Ohio
- Coordinates: 39°45′N 84°17′W
- Country: United States
- State: Ohio
- Founded: May 1, 1803
- Named for: Richard Montgomery
- Seat: Dayton
- Largest city: Dayton

Area
  - Total: 464 sq mi (1,200 km^{2})
  - Land: 462 sq mi (1,200 km^{2})
  - Water: 2.8 sq mi (7.3 km^{2}) 0.6%

Population (2020)
  - Total: 537,309
  - Estimate (2025): 539,598 ▲
  - Density: 1,160/sq mi (449/km^{2})
- Time zone: UTC−5 (Eastern)
  - Summer (DST): UTC−4 (EDT)
- Congressional district: 10th
- Website: www.mcohio.org

Montgomery County is in the southwestern part of the U.S. state of Ohio. At the 2020 census, the population was 537,309, making it the fifth-most populous county in Ohio. The county seat is Dayton. The county was named in honor of Richard Montgomery, an American Revolutionary War general, who was killed in 1775 while attempting to capture Quebec City, Canada. Montgomery County is part of the Dayton, Ohio, Metropolitan Statistical Area.

== Geography ==
The county has a total area of 464 square miles (1,200 km^{2}), of which 462 square miles (1,200 km^{2}) is land and 2.8 square miles (7.3 km^{2}) (0.6%) is water.

=== Adjacent counties ===
- Miami County (north)
- Clark County (northeast)
- Greene County (east)
- Warren County (south)
- Butler County (southwest)
- Preble County (west)
- Darke County (northwest)

=== Major highways ===
- Interstate 70
- Interstate 70 Alternate
- Interstate 75
- Interstate 675
- U.S. Route 25
- U.S. Route 35
- U.S. Route 40
- State Route 4
- State Route 48
- State Route 49
- State Route 123
- State Route 201
- State Route 202
- State Route 235
- State Route 444
- State Route 725
- State Route 741
- State Route 835

=== National protected area ===
- Dayton Aviation Heritage National Historical Park (part)

== Demographics ==
Historical population
Census	Pop.	Note	%±
1810	7,722		—
1820	15,999		107.2%
1830	24,362		52.3%
1840	31,938		31.1%
1850	38,218		19.7%
1860	52,230		36.7%
1870	64,006		22.5%
1880	78,550		22.7%
1890	100,552		28.0%
1900	130,146		29.4%
1910	163,763		25.8%
1920	209,532		27.9%
1930	273,481		30.5%
1940	295,480		8.0%
1950	398,441		34.8%
1960	527,080		32.3%
1970	606,148		15.0%
1980	571,697		−5.7%
1990	573,809		0.4%
2000	559,062		−2.6%
2010	535,153		−4.3%
2020	537,309		0.4%
2025 (est.)	539,598	▲	0.4%
U.S. Decennial Census; 1790-1960 1900-1990; 1990-2000 2010-2020

=== 2020 census ===
As of the 2020 census, the county had a population of 537,309. The median age was 39.6 years. 21.7% of residents were under the age of 18 and 18.5% of residents were 65 years of age or older. For every 100 females there were 93.3 males, and for every 100 females age 18 and over there were 90.5 males age 18 and over.

The racial makeup of the county was 67.9% White, 21.2% Black or African American, 0.3% American Indian and Alaska Native, 2.4% Asian, <0.1% Native Hawaiian and Pacific Islander, 1.9% from some other race, and 6.3% from two or more races. Hispanic or Latino residents of any race comprised 3.9% of the population.

94.5% of residents lived in urban areas, while 5.5% lived in rural areas.

There were 228,536 households in the county, of which 27.0% had children under the age of 18 living in them. Of all households, 38.6% were married-couple households, 21.5% were households with a male householder and no spouse or partner present, and 32.5% were households with a female householder and no spouse or partner present. About 34.3% of all households were made up of individuals and 13.8% had someone living alone who was 65 years of age or older.

There were 251,523 housing units, of which 9.1% were vacant. Among occupied housing units, 60.2% were owner-occupied and 39.8% were renter-occupied. The homeowner vacancy rate was 1.5% and the rental vacancy rate was 8.4%.

=== Racial and ethnic composition ===
Montgomery County, Ohio – Racial and ethnic composition Note: the US Census treats Hispanic/Latino as an ethnic category. This table excludes Latinos from the racial categories and assigns them to a separate category. Hispanics/Latinos may be of any race.
Race / Ethnicity (NH = Non-Hispanic)	Pop 1980	Pop 1990	Pop 2000	Pop 2010	Pop 2020	% 1980	% 1990	% 2000	% 2010	% 2020
White alone (NH)	468,421	460,568	424,183	388,917	360,396	81.94%	80.27%	75.87%	72.67%	67.07%
Black or African American alone (NH)	94,025	101,421	110,454	111,105	112,818	16.45%	17.68%	19.76%	20.76%	21.00%
Native American or Alaska Native alone (NH)	669	1,019	1,182	1,096	937	0.12%	0.18%	0.21%	0.20%	0.17%
Asian alone (NH)	3,214	5,757	7,267	9,195	12,714	0.56%	1.00%	1.30%	1.72%	2.37%
Native Hawaiian or Pacific Islander alone (NH)	x	x	176	163	244	x	x	0.03%	0.03%	0.05%
Other race alone (NH)	1,209	505	949	924	2,588	0.21%	0.09%	0.17%	0.17%	0.48%
Mixed race or Multiracial (NH)	x	x	7,755	11,576	26,433	x	x	1.39%	2.16%	4.92%
Hispanic or Latino (any race)	4,159	4,539	7,096	12,177	21,179	0.73%	0.79%	1.27%	2.28%	3.94%
Total	571,697	573,809	559,062	535,153	537,309	100.00%	100.00%	100.00%	100.00%	100.00%

=== 2010 census ===
As of the 2010 census, there were 535,153 people, 223,943 households, and 138,060 families living in the county. The population density was 1,159.5 inhabitants per square mile (447.7/km^{2}). There were 254,775 housing units at an average density of 552.0 per square mile (213.1/km^{2}). The racial makeup of the county was 73.9% white, 20.9% black or African American, 1.7% Asian, 0.2% American Indian, 0.8% from other races, and 2.4% from two or more races. Those of Hispanic or Latino origin made up 2.3% of the population. In terms of ancestry, 24.9% were German, 12.8% were Irish, 9.7% were American, and 8.8% were English.

Of the 223,943 households, 29.7% had children under the age of 18 living with them, 41.6% were married couples living together, 15.3% had a female householder with no husband present, 38.4% were non-families, and 32.2% of all households were made up of individuals. The average household size was 2.33, and the average family size was 2.94. The median age was 39.2 years.

The median income for a household in the county was $43,965, and the median income for a family was $56,559. Males had a median income of $45,680 versus $34,991 for females. The per capita income for the county was $24,828. About 11.7% of families and 15.7% of the population were below the poverty line, including 22.7% of those under age 18 and 8.7% of those aged 65 or over.

=== 2000 census ===
As of the census of 2000, there were 559,062 people, 229,229 households, and 146,935 families living in the county. The population density was 1,211 people per square mile (468 people/km^{2}). There were 248,443 housing units at an average density of 538 per square mile (208/km^{2}). The racial makeup of the county was 76.57% White, 19.86% Black or African American, 0.23% Native American, 1.31% Asian, 0.04% Pacific Islander, 0.49% from other races, and 1.51% from two or more races. 1.27% of the population were Hispanic or Latino of any race.

There were 229,229 households, out of which 29.60% had children under the age of 18 living with them, 46.30% were married couples living together, 13.80% had a female householder with no husband present, and 35.90% were non-families. 30.40% of all households were made up of individuals, and 10.10% had someone living alone who was 65 years of age or older. The average household size was 2.37, and the average family size was 2.96.

In the county, the population was spread out, with 24.70% under the age of 18, 9.70% from 18 to 24, 29.00% from 25 to 44, 22.90% from 45 to 64, and 13.70% who were 65 years of age or older. The median age was 36 years. For every 100 females, there were 92.30 males. For every 100 females age 18 and over, there were 88.60 males.

The median income for a household in the county was $40,156, and the median income for a family was $50,071. Males had a median income of $38,710 versus $27,297 for females. The per capita income for the county was $21,743. About 8.30% of families and 11.30% of the population were below the poverty line, including 15.60% of those under age 18 and 8.20% of those age 65 or over.

== Politics ==
Montgomery County has been a slightly Democratic-leaning swing county since the Civil War. After voting consistently Democratic in presidential elections from 1992 to 2012, Republican Donald Trump narrowly defeated Democrat Hillary Clinton in the county in 2016. The last Democrat to win the county by double digits was Lyndon B. Johnson in 1964, while the last Republican to do so was George H. W. Bush in 1988.

United States presidential election results for Montgomery County, Ohio
Year	Republican		Democratic		Third party(ies)	
Year	No.	%	No.	%	No.	%
1856	4,038	46.34%	4,285	49.17%	391	4.49%
1860	4,974	50.07%	4,710	47.41%	251	2.53%
1864	5,554	51.21%	5,291	48.79%	0	0.00%
1868	6,502	51.54%	6,113	48.46%	0	0.00%
1872	6,998	49.17%	7,183	50.47%	50	0.35%
1876	7,921	46.82%	8,971	53.02%	27	0.16%
1880	9,726	48.28%	10,332	51.28%	89	0.44%
1884	11,524	50.12%	11,326	49.26%	143	0.62%
1888	12,491	47.89%	13,142	50.38%	451	1.73%
1892	13,197	46.88%	14,067	49.97%	888	3.15%
1896	18,333	53.56%	15,540	45.40%	359	1.05%
1900	19,606	53.55%	16,236	44.34%	772	2.11%
1904	22,144	58.70%	13,933	36.93%	1,648	4.37%
1908	20,069	47.09%	20,566	48.26%	1,980	4.65%
1912	10,341	26.15%	15,544	39.31%	13,653	34.53%
1916	19,683	41.99%	24,339	51.92%	2,853	6.09%
1920	46,493	51.67%	38,433	42.72%	5,049	5.61%
1924	50,845	62.61%	21,860	26.92%	8,505	10.47%
1928	71,279	64.53%	38,517	34.87%	665	0.60%
1932	49,267	46.60%	51,270	48.50%	5,180	4.90%
1936	44,742	35.02%	76,430	59.81%	6,606	5.17%
1940	57,866	40.20%	86,084	59.80%	0	0.00%
1944	63,336	43.47%	82,367	56.53%	0	0.00%
1948	60,048	43.48%	76,879	55.66%	1,187	0.86%
1952	91,905	53.51%	79,860	46.49%	0	0.00%
1956	107,278	58.45%	76,270	41.55%	0	0.00%
1960	109,602	52.71%	98,325	47.29%	0	0.00%
1964	71,979	36.24%	126,633	63.76%	0	0.00%
1968	84,766	40.93%	96,082	46.39%	26,272	12.68%
1972	120,998	58.02%	82,231	39.43%	5,323	2.55%
1976	100,223	47.40%	106,468	50.35%	4,745	2.24%
1980	101,443	45.49%	105,110	47.13%	16,456	7.38%
1984	137,053	58.97%	94,016	40.45%	1,333	0.57%
1988	131,596	57.48%	95,737	41.82%	1,610	0.70%
1992	104,751	40.02%	108,017	41.27%	48,952	18.70%
1996	95,391	41.30%	115,469	50.00%	20,097	8.70%
2000	109,792	47.53%	114,597	49.61%	6,598	2.86%
2004	138,371	48.97%	142,997	50.60%	1,216	0.43%
2008	128,679	46.12%	145,997	52.32%	4,355	1.56%
2012	124,841	46.81%	137,139	51.42%	4,727	1.77%
2016	123,909	47.68%	122,016	46.95%	13,951	5.37%
2020	129,034	47.94%	135,064	50.18%	5,066	1.88%
2024	125,566	48.95%	126,767	49.41%	4,211	1.64%

United States Senate election results for Montgomery County, Ohio1
Year	Republican		Democratic		Third party(ies)	
Year	No.	%	No.	%	No.	%
2024	112,324	44.58%	130,464	51.78%	9,146	3.63%

== Government ==
=== Montgomery County Officials ===
Office	Officeholder	Party
Montgomery County Commissioner	Judy Dodge	Democratic
Montgomery County Commissioner	Mary McDonald	Republican
Montgomery County Commissioner	Carolyn Rice	Democratic
Auditor	Karl Keith	Democratic
Clerk of Courts	Mike Foley	Republican
Coroner	Kent Harshbarger	Republican
Engineer	Andrew Shahan	Democratic
Prosecutor	Mathias Heck Jr.	Democratic
Recorder	Lori Kennedy	Republican
Sheriff	Rob Streck	Republican
Treasurer	John McManus	Republican

=== Ohio House of Representatives ===
District	Representative	Party
36	Andrea White	Republican
37	J. Thomas Young	Republican
38	Desiree Tims	Democratic
39	Phil Plummer	Republican
40	Rodney Creech	Republican

=== Ohio State Senate ===
District	Senator	Party
5	Stephen Huffman	Republican
6	Willis Blackshear	Democratic

=== United States House of Representatives ===
District	Representative	Party
10	Mike Turner	Republican

=== United States Senate ===
Senator	Party
Bernie Moreno	Republican
Jon Husted	Republican

== Education ==
=== Post-secondary institutions ===
==== Public ====
- Air Force Institute of Technology (actually located in Wright-Patterson AFB, Ohio).
- Sinclair Community College
- Wright State University (actually located in neighboring Greene County, Ohio, but uses a Dayton address).

==== Private ====
- University of Dayton
- Kettering College of Medical Arts
- The Miami Valley School

=== Public schools ===
The following public school districts are located partially or entirely in Montgomery County:

- Local School Districts
  - Brookville Local School District
    - Brookville High School, Brookville (the Blue Devils)
  - Carlisle Local School District
    - Carlisle High School, Carlisle (the Indians)
  - Jefferson Township Local School District
    - Jefferson Township High School, Dayton (the Broncos)
  - Mad River Local School District
    - Stebbins High School
  - New Lebanon Local School District
    - Dixie High School, Dixie (the Greyhounds)
  - Northridge Local School District
    - Northridge High School (the Polar Bears)
  - Preble Shawnee Local School District
  - Tri-County North Local School District
  - Valley View Local School District
    - Valley View High School, Germantown (the Spartans)
- City School Districts
  - Beavercreek City School District
    - Beavercreek High School
  - Centerville City School District
    - Centerville High School, Centerville (the Elks)
  - Dayton Public Schools
    - Belmont High School for Computer Technology/Engineering, Dayton (the Bison)
    - Thurgood Marshall High School for the Arts, Dayton (the Cougars)
    - Dayton Early College Academy, Dayton
    - Dunbar High School for Professional Studies, Dayton (the Wolverines)
    - Meadowdale High School for Cultural Studies/International Baccalaureate, Dayton (the Lions)
    - Stivers School for the Arts, Dayton (Tigers)
  - Fairborn City School District
  - Huber Heights City School District
    - Wayne High School, Huber Heights (the Warriors)
  - Kettering City School District
    - Fairmont High School, Kettering (the Firebirds)
      - (merger of the former Fairmont East and Fairmont West high schools (the East Falcons and the West Dragons)
  - Miamisburg City School District
    - Miamisburg High School, Miamisburg (the Vikings)
  - Northmont City School District
    - Northmont High School, Clayton (the Thunderbolts)
  - Oakwood City School District
    - Oakwood High School, Oakwood (the Lumberjacks)
  - Springboro Community City School District
  - Trotwood-Madison City School District
    - Trotwood-Madison High School, Trotwood (the Rams)
  - Vandalia-Butler City School District
    - Butler High School, Vandalia (the Aviators)
  - West Carrollton City School District
    - West Carrollton High School, West Carrollton (the Pirates)

There is also a public independent (not a part of any school district) STEM school:

- The Dayton Regional STEM School

=== Private schools ===
The following private high schools are located in Montgomery County:

- Archbishop Alter High School, Kettering (the Knights) (Roman Catholic)
- Carroll High School, Dayton (the Patriots) (Roman Catholic)
- Chaminade Julienne High School, Dayton (Eagles) (Roman Catholic/Marianist)
- Dayton Christian High School, Dayton (the Warriors) (nondenominational Christian)
- Dominion Academy, Dayton (the Sabers) (Christ the King Anglican Church)
- The Miami Valley School, Dayton (the Rams) (nonsectarian)
- Salem Christian Academy, Clayton
- Spring Valley Academy, Centerville (Seventh-day Adventist)

== Communities ==
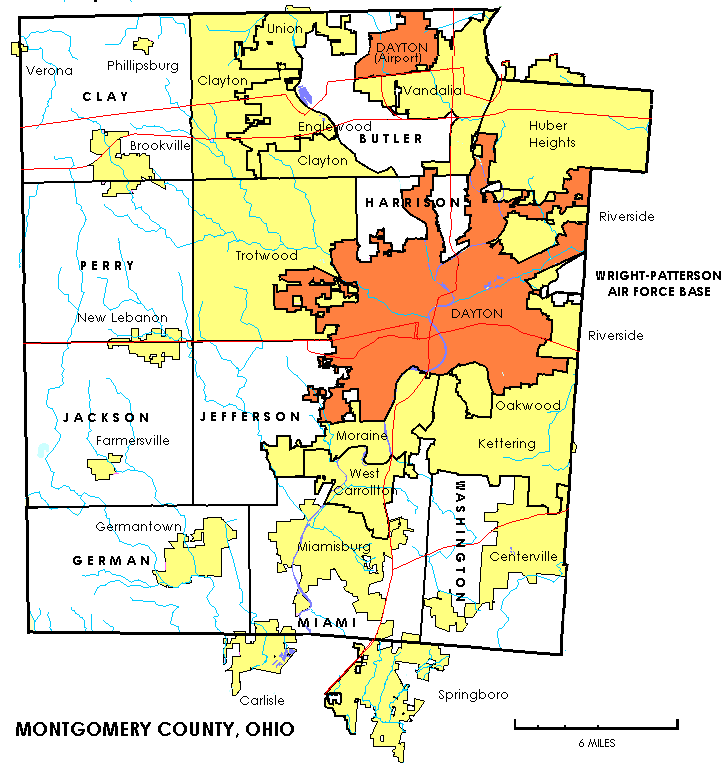

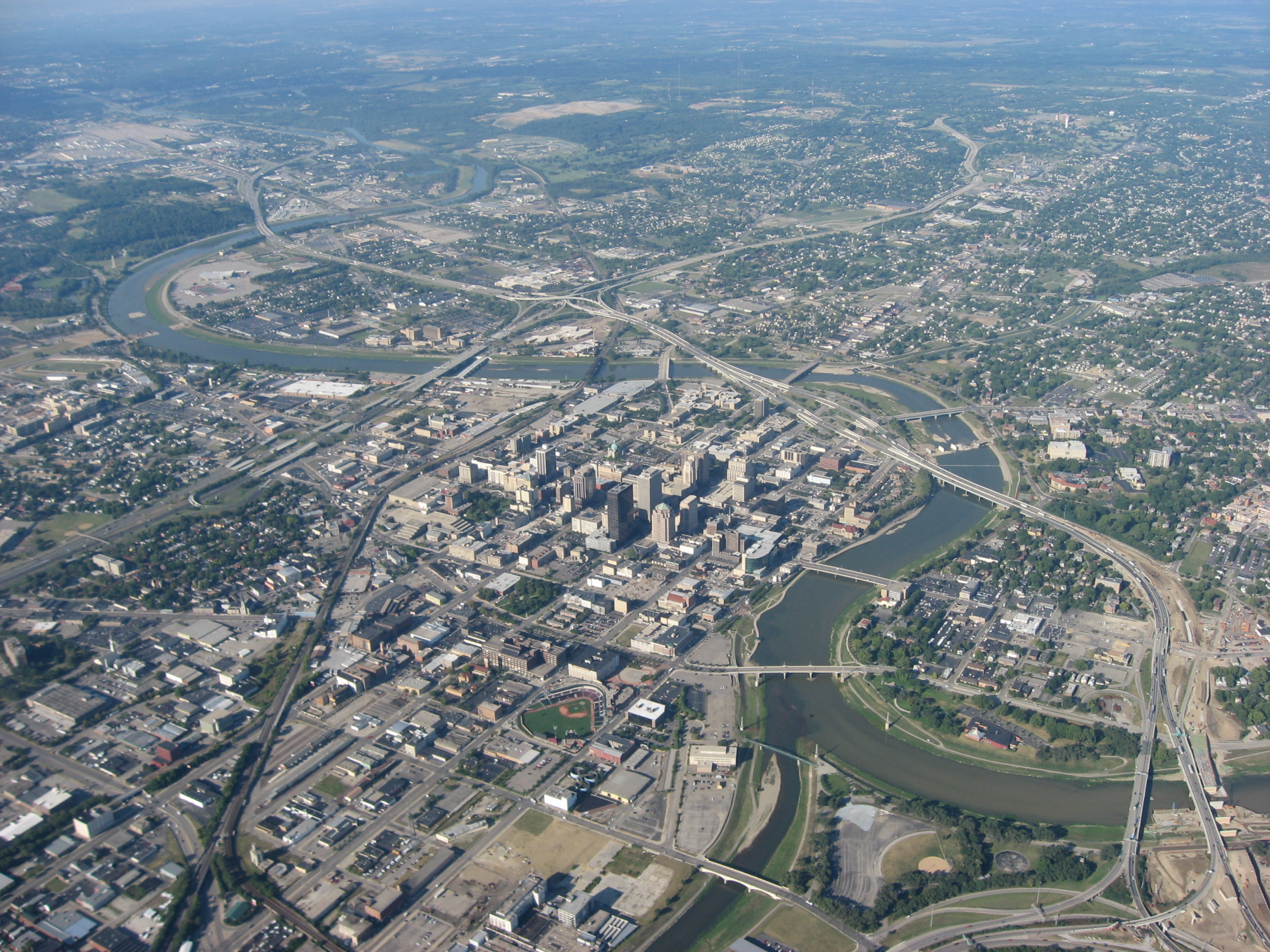
Downtown Dayton, the largest city in Montgomery County

=== Cities ===
- Brookville
- Carlisle (mostly in Warren County)
- Centerville (partly in Greene County)
- Clayton
- Dayton (county seat)
- Englewood
- Germantown
- Huber Heights (partly in Miami County)
- Kettering (partly in Greene County)
- Miamisburg
- Moraine
- Oakwood
- Riverside
- Springboro (mostly in Warren County)
- Trotwood
- Union (mostly in Montgomery County)
- Vandalia
- West Carrollton

=== Villages ===
- Farmersville
- New Lebanon
- Phillipsburg
- Verona (mostly in Preble County)

=== Townships ===
- Butler
- Clay
- German
- Harrison
- Jackson
- Jefferson
- Miami
- Perry
- Washington

=== Defunct townships ===
- Dayton
- Mad River (remnant merged with the Village of Riverside in 1994)
- Madison (remnant merged with the Village of Trotwood in 1996)
- Randolph (remnant merged with the Village of Clayton in 1998)
- Van Buren (partitioned between the municipalities of Kettering and Moraine in 1952–1953)
- Wayne (incorporated as Huber Heights in 1981)

=== Census-designated place ===
- Drexel
- Fort McKinley
- Shiloh

=== Unincorporated communities ===
- Airhill
- Amity
- Arlington
- Bachman
- Chautauqua
- Dodson
- Harries
- Kinsey
- Liberty
- Little York
- Miami Villa
- Morgan Place
- Murlin Heights
- New Chicago
- Northridge
- Pyrmont
- Spanker
- Swanktown
- Taylorsburg
- Wengerlawn
- Woodbourne-Hyde Park

== See also ==
- National Register of Historic Places listings in Montgomery County, Ohio
