= Dayton Metro Library =

Public library system in Ohio, United States

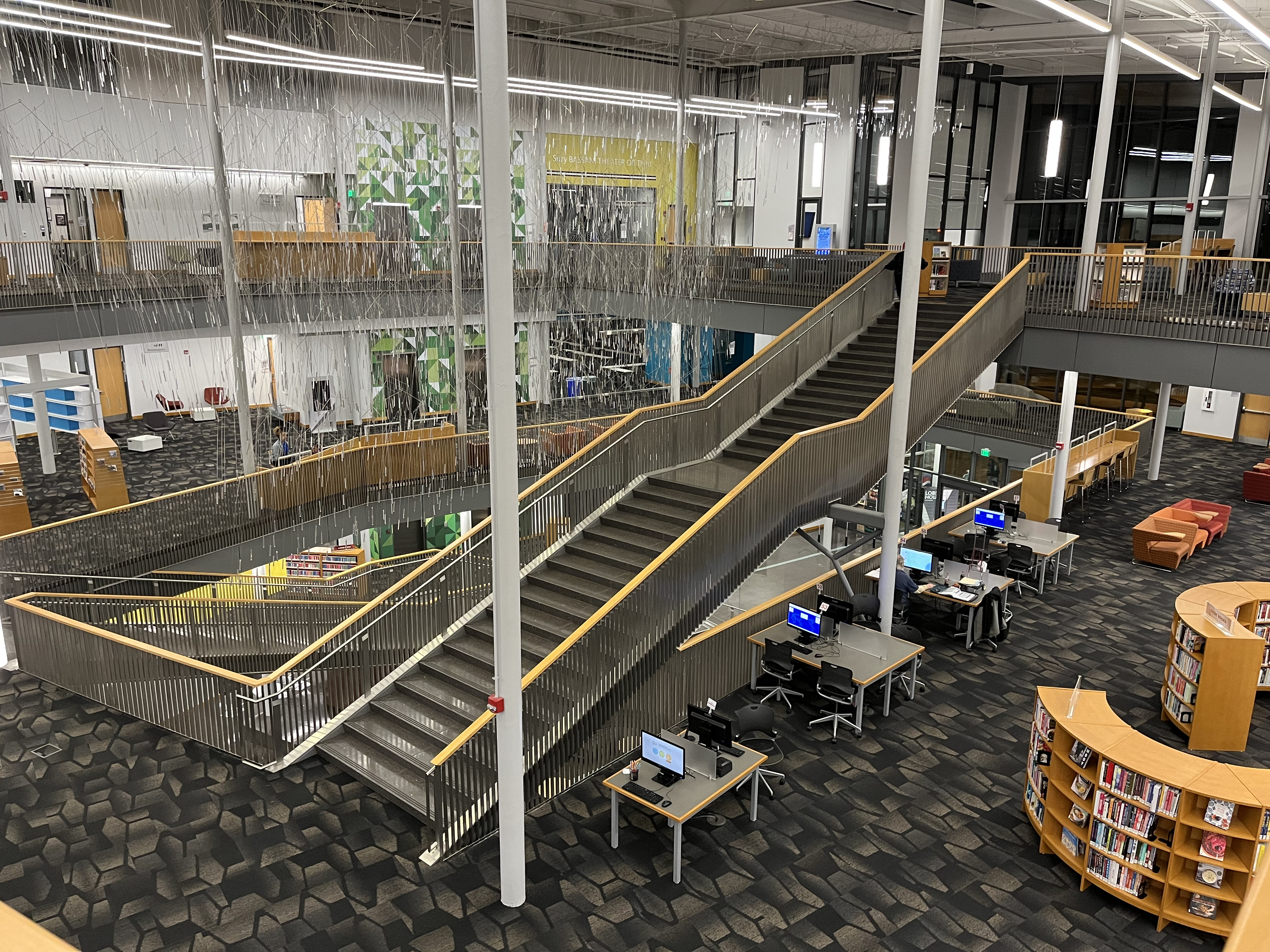
- Interior of Main Library in 2023
- 39°45′38″N 84°11′16″W
- Location: 215 E. 3rd St, Dayton, Ohio 45402, United States
- Type: Public library
- Established: 1860 (Dayton Library Association established 1847 and Dayton Public School Library established 1855; merged into Dayton Public Library 1860)
- Branches: Main Library and 18 branches

Collection
- Size: 873,871 physical items (2024)
- Legal deposit: Selective federal depository library

Access and use
- Circulation: 4,815,979
- Population served: 452,238
- Members: 379,934

Other information
- Budget: $48,621,907
- Interim Executive Director: Rachel Gut
- Employees: 400 staff (326.79 FTE)
- Website: daytonmetrolibrary.org

Dayton Metro Library is a multi-branch library system serving 531,687 residents of the Dayton Metropolitan Area. It has 18 locations across the area (including the Main Library, 16 branch libraries, and Outreach Services with a bookmobile). Around 4.8 million items were borrowed in 2024. In 2010, the Dayton Metro Library ranked in the top ten best libraries in the United States serving a population of over 250,000 by HAPLR. The Dayton Metro Library system is considered a county system with branches in cities and towns throughout Montgomery County, Ohio, but does not have branches in Centerville, Germantown, Oakwood, Riverside or Washington Township. All are serviced by libraries of their own, save Riverside, various parts of which are geographically close to Dayton Metro Library locations, including Burkhardt, Electra C. Doren and Huber Heights.

== History ==
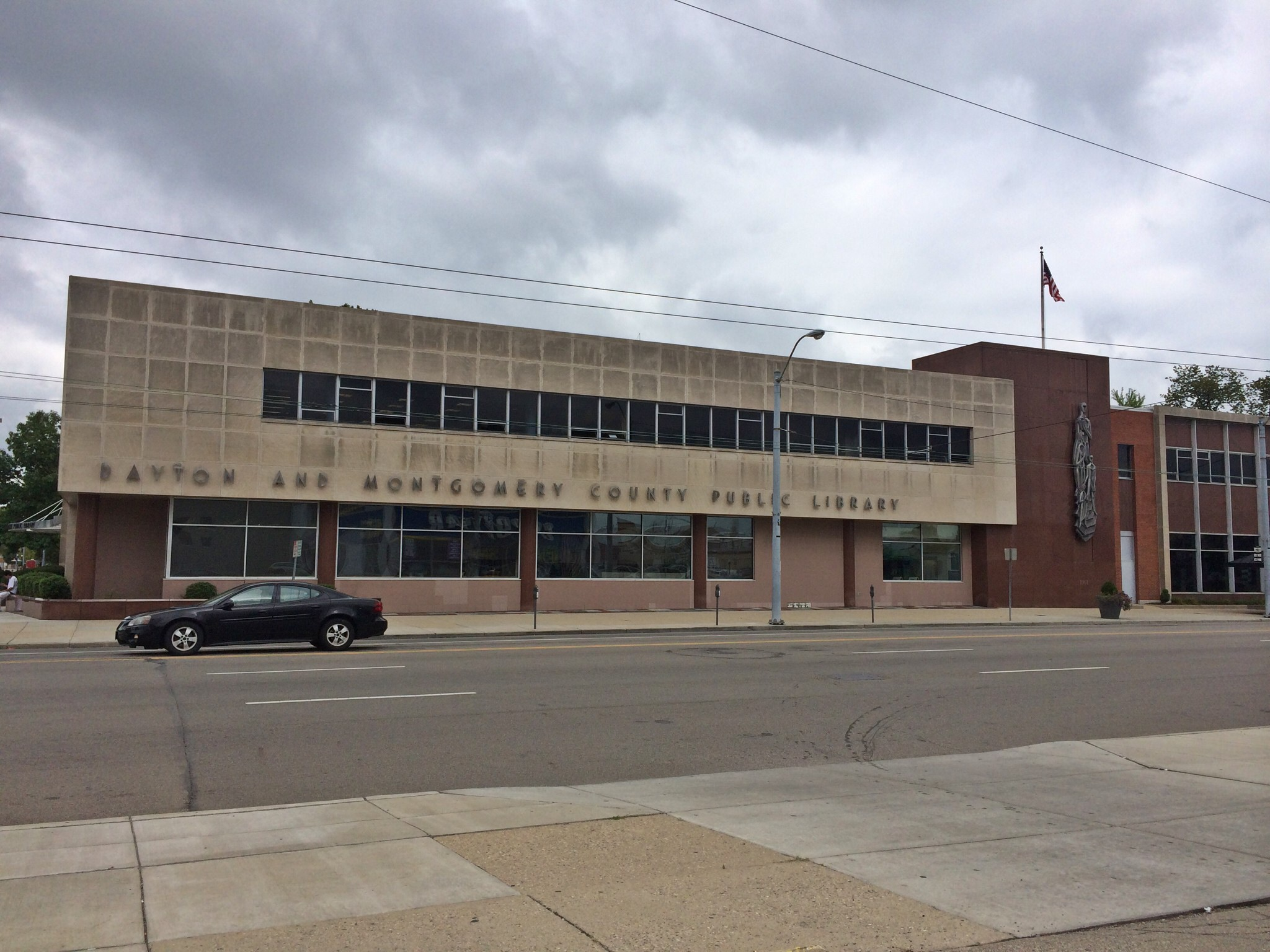
Former Main Library in Downtown Dayton in 2015

Library service in Dayton began in 1805 with the Social Library Society of Dayton. The Society was also the first library to be incorporated in Ohio. The Society was dissolved in 1821 and books were sold at auction.

In 1847, the Dayton Library Association was established. This lasted until 1860 when it merged with the Public School Library, founded in 1855. After this merger, the Dayton Public Library's affairs were overseen by three members of the Library Committee of the Dayton Board of Education. In 1887, the Dayton Public Library was organized as a school district library operating under an independent non-partisan Library Board. A new building was opened in Cooper Park in January 1888. A museum of natural history was opened inside the building in 1893, at which point the library's name was changed to the Dayton Public Library and Museum. Bookmobile service began in October 1923. Paul North Rice served as director from 1927-1936. In 1948, the library changed in legal form from a school district library to a county district library.

In November 1956, after the museum collections were officially transferred from the library to the recently established Dayton Society of Natural History, the library officially changed its name to the Dayton and Montgomery County Public Library. A new $2.3 million building was constructed for the Main Library in 1960, with groundbreaking taking place on August 29. The new building, adjacent to the old building (since razed), opened on March 26, 1962, and is still in use today (albeit with renovations done in 1987, 1998–2000, and 2015-2017). The Dayton and Montgomery County Public Library name stayed on until June 19, 2002, when it officially changed its name to the Dayton Metro Library. A new logo and website were unveiled in January 2003. Another new website was unveiled in December 2014, featuring a new library logo, overall new design and a number of new functionalities.

== Reconstruction ==
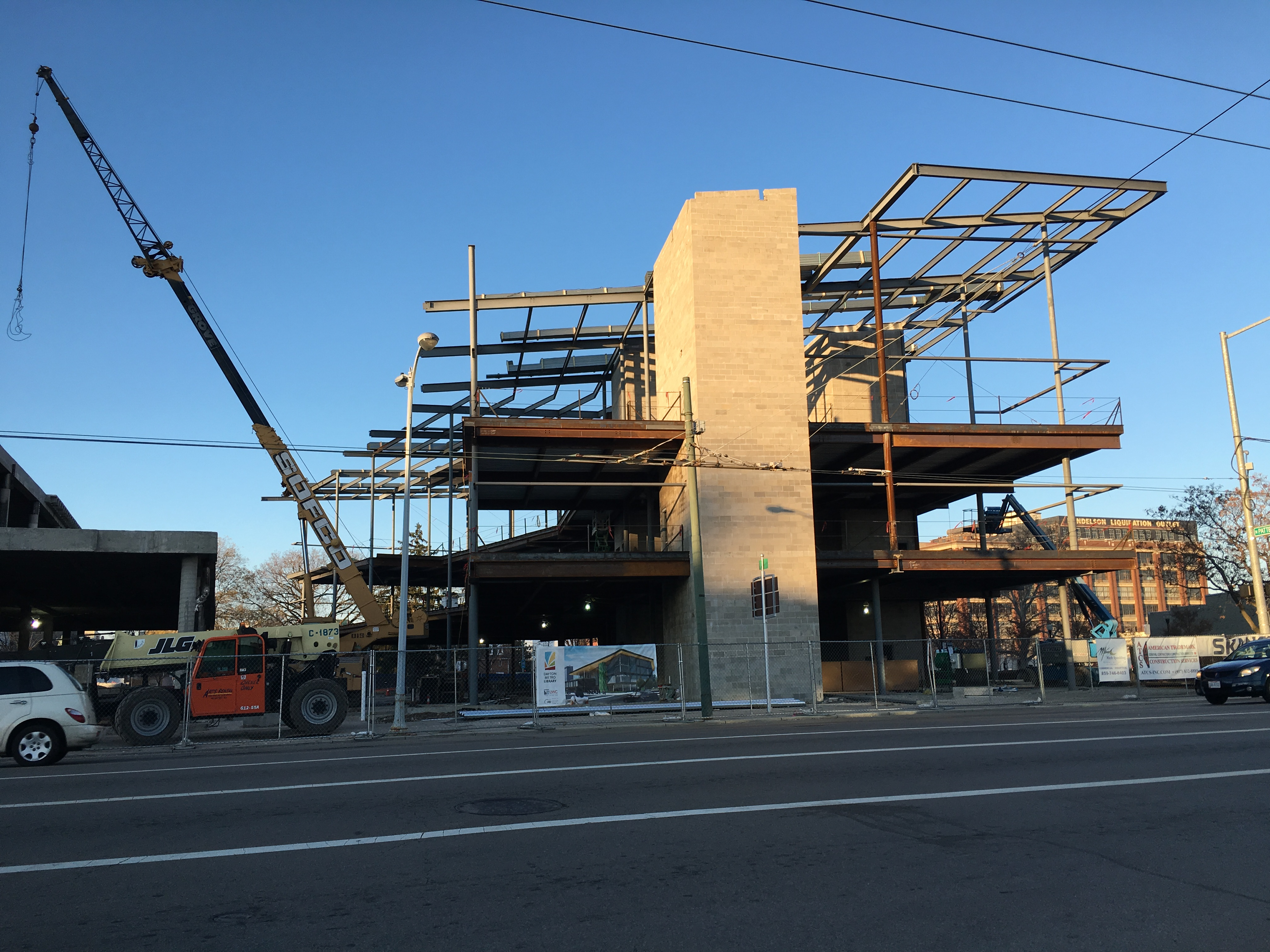
New Library Facility under construction

In November 2012, Dayton, Ohio area voters passed Issue 70, a $187 million bond issue covering building and renovation, with a vote of over 60% support. The project allowed for a completely renovated main branch of the library, expansion and/or remodeling and renovation on a number of existing branches, entirely new facilities for certain locations, and the consolidation of certain underperforming and outdated facilities with larger, modernized branches. The Dayton Daily News reported on this levy and said "the plan would change libraries from 'books and bricks' into community centers designed to provide traditional library services, as well as the latest technology."

On March 20, 2013, it was announced that a re-examination of the plan had determined that in certain cases new libraries could be built rather than expanding or renovating certain branches, without increasing the cost of the plan. As such, it was determined that the Brookville, Miamisburg, New Lebanon, Northmont and Trotwood Branches would all be moved to new buildings, rather than being renovated/expanded. The renovated and new facilities were originally expected to be completed by year-end 2017, though delays in construction and property acquisition moved this back to June 2023, when the new Huber Heights Branch Library officially opened.

== Branches ==
- Brookville Branch, 120 Blue Pride Drive, Brookville
- Burkhardt Branch, 4704 Burkhardt Ave.
- Electra C. Doren Branch, 701 Troy St.
- Huber Heights Branch, 6243 Brandt Pike, Huber Heights
- Kettering Moraine Branch, 3496 Far Hills Ave., Kettering
- Main Library, 215 E. 3rd St.
- Miami Township Branch, 2718 Lyons Rd., Miamisburg
- Miamisburg Branch, 545 E. Linden Ave., Miamisburg
- New Lebanon Branch, 715 W. Main St., New Lebanon
- Northmont Branch, 700 W. National Rd., Englewood
- Northwest Branch, 2410 Philadelphia Dr.
- Operations Center, 120 S. Patterson Blvd. (Not open to public)
- Outreach Services, 120 S. Patterson Blvd. (Not open to public)
- Southeast Branch, 21 Watervliet Ave.
- Trotwood Branch, 855 E. Main St., Trotwood
- Vandalia Branch, 330 S. Dixie Dr., Vandalia
- West Branch, 300 Abbey Ave.
- West Carrollton Branch, 300 E. Central Ave., West Carrollton
- Wilmington-Stroop Branch, 3980 Wilmington Pike, Kettering

=== Past Branches ===
- Belmont Branch, 1041 Watervliet Ave. (Permanently closed Friday, July 26, 2019, and replaced by Southeast Branch)
- Brookville Branch, 425 Rona Parkway, Brookville (Permanently closed Saturday, July 30, 2016, and replaced by new building)
- Burkhardt Branch, 4680 Burkhardt Ave. (Permanently closed Saturday, March 26, 2022, and replaced by new building)
- Dayton Mall Mini-Branch Library (Discontinued in the early 2000s)
- Dayton View Branch, 1515 Salem Ave. (Opened October 1930 after previously being housed in the Community House of the congregation of K. K. B'nai Yeshurun on Salem Avenue. Permanently closed Wednesday, March 30, 2016, and replaced by Northwest Branch)
- East Branch, 2008 Wyoming St. (Permanently closed Saturday, July 6, 2019, and replaced by Southeast Branch)
- East Carnegie Branch, 2160 E Fifth St. (Dedicated February 27, 1914, in use until the fall of 1969. After closing, the collection was moved to the new East Branch. The structure remains and was used for meetings of Dayton's Southeast Priority Board from 1999 to 2012. In 2008 it received an Ohio Historic Preservation Merit Award. It currently serves as the administrative offices for the St. Mary Development Corporation.)
- Ft. McKinley Branch, 3735 Salem Ave. (Built on land donated by Elizabeth B. Doren [the former Vice-Librarian and Head of Acquisition for Dayton Public Library, and the sister of Electra C. Doren, the long-time chief librarian of Dayton Public Library, and the namesake of the Electra C. Doren Branch]. Opened in April 1955 and permanently closed Wednesday, March 30, 2016, and replaced by Northwest Branch)
- Genealogy Center, 359 Maryland Ave. (This was a temporary branch from 2015 to 2017 while the Main Library was being renovated)
- Hills and Dales Branch, Kettering. (This was a branch located in a shopping plaza on Route 25 and Dorothy Lane in the 1970s)
- Huber Heights Branches, Huber Heights. (Originally opened in May 1962 in the Huber Heights Shopping Center on Chambersburg Rd. Moved to a new location on Brandt Pike in 1967, expanded in 1979. Moved to a new location (6160 Chambersburg Rd.) in the Huber Centre Shopping Center on November 4, 1996. Permanently closed Saturday, May 6, 2023, and replaced by a new building on Brandt Pike.)
- Madden Hills Branch, 2542 Germantown St. (Permanently closed Friday, January 14, 2022, and replaced by West Branch)
- Miamisburg Branch, 35 S. Fifth St., Miamisburg (Permanently closed Saturday, January 28, 2017, and replaced by new building)
- New Lebanon Branch, 715 W. Main St., New Lebanon (Opened in 1955 as the "Johnsville-New Lebanon Branch" with the cooperation of the local Mothers' Club. Joined the Dayton Public Library system in 1957. Permanently closed Saturday, July 2, 2016, and replaced by new building. The structure was torn down to become the parking lot for the new building.)
- Northmont Branch, 333 W. National Rd., Englewood (Was located in the Englewood Government Center. Permanently closed Saturday, November 26, 2022, and replaced by new building)
- Northtown-Shiloh Branch, 35 Bennington Dr. (Plans were drawn in 1957 for land donated by the Beerman Corporation. Permanently closed Tuesday, March 29, 2016, and replaced by Northwest Branch)
- Outreach Services, 2293 Arbor Blvd. (Permanently closed Tuesday, November 12, 2024, and moved into the first floor of the Operations Center, 120 S. Patterson Blvd.)
- Temporary Main, 120 S. Patterson Blvd (first floor). (This was the temporary Main branch from 2015 to 2017 while the Main Library was being renovated)
- Trotwood Branch, 651 E. Main St., Trotwood (Permanently closed Saturday, February 22, 2020, and replaced by new building)
- Vandalia Branch, 500 S. Dixie Dr., Vandalia (Permanently closed Wednesday, October 26, 2016, and replaced by new building. The old Vandalia Branch Library was converted into the new Board of Education building for the Vandalia-Butler City School District, while the old Board of Education building was torn down and the new Vandalia Branch Library was built on its site.)
- West Carnegie Branch, 1612 West Fifth Street (corner of Euclid and West Fifth). (Dedicated February 25, 1914, in use until the fall of 1969. After closing, the collection was temporarily housed at Wogaman Elementary School before being moved to the new Madden Hills Branch. The building itself was later destroyed by a fire in 1979)
- Westwood Branch, 3207 Hoover Ave. (Opened November 30, 1938. Permanently closed Saturday, January 15, 2022, and replaced by West Branch)

=== Issue 70 Branch changes ===
Under the ten-year bond issue, Issue 70 (also known as "Libraries for Tomorrow"), passed by voters, the branch structure will be modified as follows:

- Main Library, Kettering-Moraine Branch, Miami Township Branch, West Carrollton Branch, Wilmington-Stroop Branch (Fully renovated and expanded)
- Belmont Branch & East Branch (Combined and replaced with Southeast Branch)
- Electra C. Doren Branch (Updated and renovated, the Electra C. Doren branch was eponymously renamed from "E.C. Doren Branch" and re-opened January 3, 2015)
- Brookville Branch, Burkhardt Branch, Huber Heights Branch, Miamisburg Branch, New Lebanon Branch, Northmont Branch, Trotwood Branch, Vandalia Branch (Replaced with larger and modernized facilities in new locations)
- Dayton View Branch, Ft. McKinley Branch, Northtown-Shiloh Branch (Combined and replaced with Northwest Branch)
- Madden Hills Branch, Westwood Branch (Combined and replaced with West Branch)

== Information technology ==
At one time, borrower's cards used at Dayton Metro Library use the nearly 40-year-old Codabar barcode format, with the symbol 'A' preceding and following the account number in the barcode proper. As of at least the early 2000s, all cards issued begin with the sequence 10060 or 10061, followed by 8 digits, with the exception of online-only cards (eCards), which begin with the sequence 10065 or 10066.

As of 2012, the Dayton Metro Library's catalog operates under the Polaris system, but had previously used Horizon from 2003 to 2012, which was no longer offering software updates. Prior to this, it had used DRA from 1985.

The Library offers a unique Dial-A-Story services that provides 24/7 access to recorded content. Patrons can call 937-250-7500 from any phone and use the menu to navigate to various recordings. Children will especially enjoy story time on Dial-A-Story as it requires no internet access to use.
