= David Freeman Engstrom =

American legal scholar

- Born: Andrews Air Force Base, MD
- Education: Yale University (PhD); Stanford Law School (JD); Oxford University (MSc); Dartmouth College (BA)
- Occupation: American legal scholar
- Employer: Stanford Law School

David Freeman Engstrom is a legal academic and academic administrator whose work focuses on the design and implementation of litigation and regulatory regimes, access to courts, and law and technology. He is the LSVF Professor in Law, as well as Co-Director of the Deborah L. Rhode Center on the Legal Profession, at Stanford Law School, where he has taught since 2009.

== Education and early career ==
Engstrom grew up an air force kid in Dayton, Ohio. He graduated from Walter E. Stebbins High School in 1989, and from Dartmouth College in 1993 with an A.B., magna cum laude, in History. After college, Engstrom joined the Mississippi Teacher Corps and taught high school English and coached football. He then attended Oxford University as a Fulbright Scholar, earning an M.Sc. in Economic and Social History in 1997. In 2002, Engstrom graduated with a J.D., Order of the Coif and with honors, from Stanford Law School, where he edited the Stanford Law Review. He also holds a Ph.D. in Political Science from Yale University.

== Academic career ==
Engstrom joined the Stanford Law School faculty in 2009. He became Professor of Law in 2014. From 2018 to 2021, he served as Associate Dean, and in 2021, he became the LSVF Professor. He teaches, among other courses, Civil Procedure, Administrative Law, and Access to Justice.

Engstrom is a scholar of public law, complex organizations, and political economy whose research and teaching explore problems in administrative law and legislation, artificial intelligence and the law, constitutional law, civil rights, and access to courts. His scholarly work has been frequently cited by courts and litigants. He also frequently authors or co-authors litigation and amicus briefs filed in courts.

In 2020, Engstrom was a principal adviser to the Administrative Conference of the United States and co-author of a major report with Mariano-Florentino Cuellar, Daniel Ho, and Catherine Sharkey on the use of artificial intelligence by federal agencies. In 2023, Engstrom published a book, Legal Tech and the Future of Civil Justice. In 2021, Engstrom co-founded the Filing Fairness Project, a collaboration between Stanford Law School and six states to improve court filing processes for self-represented litigants. In 2021, Engstrom was named the Co-Director, with his colleague and spouse, Nora Freeman Engstrom, of the Deborah L. Rhode Center on the Legal Profession, named for their former colleague, Deborah Rhode. In 2022, the American Law Institute appointed Engstrom the Reporter for the project, Principles of the Law, High-Volume Civil Adjudication.

Engstrom is an appointed member of the Administrative Conference of the United States and an elected member of the American Law Institute.

Engstrom has published legal commentaries in the New York Times, Slate, Bloomberg, and CNN. His history of a novel lawsuit against General Motors for sex discrimination in the 1930s was featured in Smithsonian Magazine in 2022.

== Publications ==
Engstrom's scholarship has been published in the Stanford Law Review, Yale Law Journal, Columbia Law Review, and University of Pennsylvania Law Review, including:

- Agencies as Litigation Gatekeepers, 123 Yale L.J. 616 (2013)
- Digital Civil Procedure, 169 U. Pa. L. Rev. 2243 (2021)
- Legal Tech, Civil Procedure, and the Future of Adversarialism, 169 U. Pa. L. Rev. 1001 (2021) (with Jonah Gelbach)
- Legal Tech and the Future of Civil Justice (editor) (Cambridge University Press 2023)
- Legal Innovation After Reform: Evidence from Regulatory Change, Report of the Deborah L. Rhode Center on the Legal Profession (2022) (with Graham Ambrose, Lucy Ricca, and Maddie Walsh)
- Disparate Limbo: How Administrative Law Erased Antidiscrimination, 131 Yale L.J. 370 (2021) (with Cristina Ceballos and Daniel Ho)
- Government by Algorithm: Artificial Intelligence in Federal Administrative Agencies (report to the Administrative Conference of the United States) (with Mariano-Florentino Cuéllar, Daniel Ho, and Catherine Sharkey) (2020)
- The Lost Origins of American Fair Employment Law: Regulatory Choice and the Making of Modern Civil Rights, 1943-72, 63 Stan. L. Rev. 1071 (2011)
- The Twiqbal Puzzle and Empirical Study of Civil Procedure, 65 Stan. L. Rev. 1203 (2013)
- Harnessing the Private Attorney General: Evidence from Qui Tam Litigation, 112 Colum. L. Rev. 1244 (2012)
- Regulating Government AI and the Challenge of Sociotechnical Design, 19 Ann. Rev. L. & Soc. Sci. 277 (2023)

== Awards ==
In 2012, Engstrom won the William Nelson Cromwell Foundation Cromwell Article Prize from the American Society of Legal History.

== Personal life ==
Engstrom is married to fellow Stanford Law Professor Nora Freeman Engstrom.
