= Oscar Davis (baseball) =

American baseball player

- Outfielder
- Born: March 6, 1896; Harshmanville, Ohio, U.S.
- Died: May 28, 1958 (aged 62); Dayton, Ohio, U.S.

Negro league baseball debut
- 1926, for the Dayton Marcos

Last appearance
- 1926, for the Dayton Marcos

Teams
- Dayton Marcos (1926)

Oscar Davis (March 6, 1896 – May 28, 1958) was an American Negro league outfielder in the 1920s.

A native of Harshmanville, Ohio, Davis played for the Dayton Marcos in 1926. In five recorded games, he posted one hit in 17 plate appearances. Davis died in Dayton, Ohio in 1952 at age 68.
