= Dave Coleman (outfielder) =

American baseball player (born 1950)

- Outfielder
- Born: October 26, 1950 (age 75); Dayton, Ohio, U.S.
- Batted: Right Threw: Right

MLB debut
- April 3, 1977, for the Boston Red Sox

Last MLB appearance
- May 27, 1977, for the Boston Red Sox

MLB statistics
- Batting average: .000
- RBI: 0
- Runs: 1
- Stats at Baseball Reference

Teams
- Boston Red Sox (1977)

David Lee Coleman (born October 26, 1950) is an American former outfielder in Major League Baseball who played briefly for the Boston Red Sox during the 1977 season. He batted and threw right-handed.

Coleman attended Stebbins High School in Riverside, a suburb of Dayton.

Listed at 6-3, 195 lb., Coleman played in just eleven major league games. In those games, he scored one run and went hitless in twelve at-bats.

In 1979, Coleman was traded by Boston to the Minnesota Twins for Larry Wolfe, but he never appeared in a major league game again. From 1979 through 1981, he played in the minor leagues on affiliates of the Twins and the New York Yankees, retiring from baseball after the 1981 season.
