= Spanker =

Spanker may refer to:

- One who administers a spanking
- Spanker (horse), an 18th-century thoroughbred race horse
- Spanker, Ohio, an unincorporated community
- SS-17 Spanker, the NATO reporting name for the MR-UR-100 Sotka intercontinental ballistic missile
- Spanker (sail), a sail
