= Jefferson Township Local School District =

School district in Ohio

Coordinates: 39°43′25″N 84°17′59″W

Jefferson Township Local Schools is a school district in Ohio serving Jefferson Township in Montgomery County, Ohio. The School District includes Jefferson Junior/Senior High School and Blairwood Elementary School.
