= Adreian Payne =

American basketball player (1991–2022)

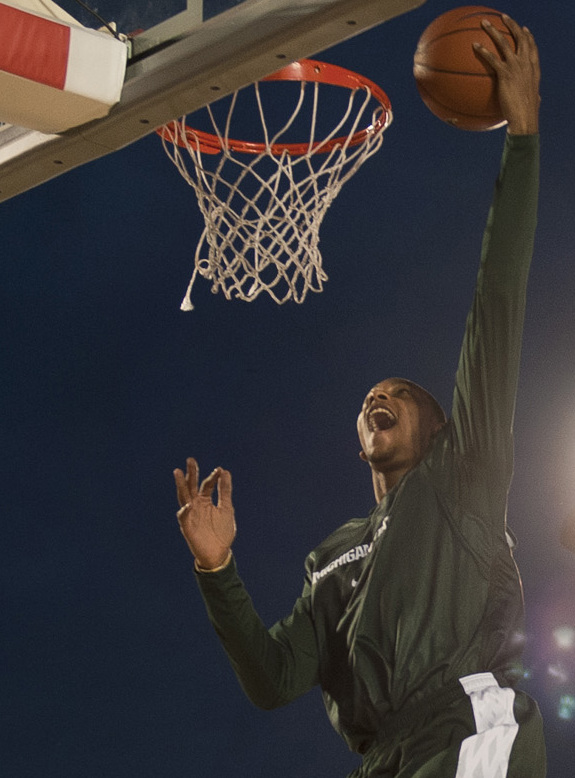
- Payne during practice on the USS Carl Vinson in 2011.

Personal information
- Born: February 19, 1991 Dayton, Ohio, U.S.
- Died: May 9, 2022 (aged 31) Orlando, Florida, U.S.
- Listed height: 6 ft 10 in (2.08 m)
- Listed weight: 237 lb (108 kg)

Career information
- High school: Jefferson Township (Dayton, Ohio)
- College: Michigan State (2010–2014)
- NBA draft: 2014: 1st round, 15th overall pick
- Drafted by: Atlanta Hawks
- Playing career: 2014–2022
- Position: Center / power forward
- Number: 33, 6, 3, 5, 55

Career history
- 2014–2015: Atlanta Hawks
- 2014: →Fort Wayne Mad Ants
- 2014–2015: →Austin Spurs
- 2015–2017: Minnesota Timberwolves
- 2016: →Erie BayHawks
- 2017–2018: Orlando Magic
- 2017–2018: →Lakeland Magic
- 2018: Panathinaikos
- 2018–2019: Nanjing Monkey King
- 2019: Panathinaikos
- 2019–2020: ASVEL
- 2021: Ormanspor
- 2021–2022: Juventus Utena

Career highlights
- Pro A champion (2019); French Cup winner (2019); Greek League champion (2018); Greek Basketball Cup winner (2019); 2× Second-team All-Big Ten (2013, 2014); Fourth-team Parade All-American (2010)

Career NBA statistics
- Points: 429 (4.0 ppg)
- Rebounds: 315 (2.9 rpg)
- Assists: 66 (0.6 apg)
- Stats at NBA.com
- Stats at Basketball Reference

Adreian DeAngleo Payne (February 19, 1991 – May 9, 2022) was an American professional basketball player. He played in the National Basketball Association (NBA) for the Atlanta Hawks, Minnesota Timberwolves, and Orlando Magic as well as for several European and Asian teams. Payne played college basketball for the Michigan State Spartans.

== High school career ==
Payne played high school basketball for Jefferson High School. He posted averages of 15.6 points, 11.3 rebounds and 4.0 blocks as a senior. As a senior, he led Jefferson to a Division IV state championship and a 19–5 record. The Dayton Daily News named him first-team All-Area. He was named a fourth-team Parade All-American.

College recruiting
Name	Hometown	School	Height	Weight	Commit date
Adreian Payne; C	Dayton, OH	Jefferson	6 ft 10 in (2.08 m)	215 lb (98 kg)	Oct 29, 2009
Adreian Payne; C	Recruit ratings: Scout: Rivals: (95)				
Overall recruit ranking: Scout: 8 Rivals: 5
Note: In many cases, Scout, Rivals, 247Sports, On3, and ESPN may conflict in their listings of height and weight.; In these cases, the average was taken. ESPN grades are on a 100-point scale.; Sources: "Michigan State Commit List for 2010". Rivals.; "Men's Basketball Recruiting". Scout.; "ESPN – Michigan State Spartans Basketball Recruiting 2010". ESPN.; "Scout.com Team Recruiting Rankings". Scout.; "2010 Team Ranking". Rivals.

== College career ==
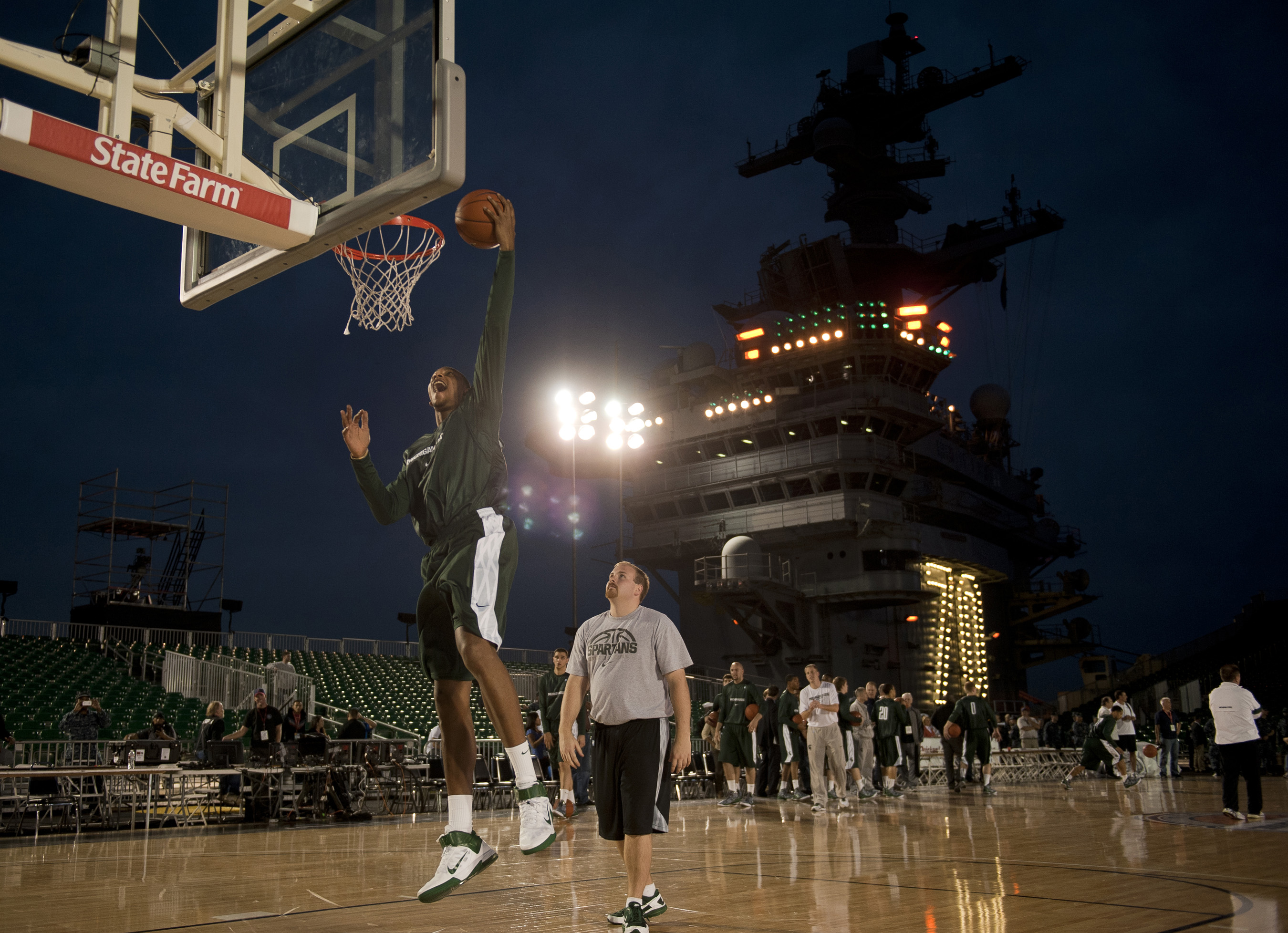
Adreian Payne practicing before the 2011 Carrier Classic

As a freshman at Michigan State University, Payne averaged 2.5 points and 2.4 rebounds per game, playing in 34 games. During that year he was diagnosed with permanent reduced lung capacity, an ailment which affected his stamina.

In his sophomore season, he led the Spartans in blocks (39) and finished seventh in the Big 10. In 37 games (36 starts), he averaged 7.0 points and 4.2 rebounds per game. He was an Academic All-Big Ten selection.

As a junior, Payne led the Big Ten in free-throw percentage (.848) and blocked a total of 46 shots, good for sixth all-time for a Michigan State player. In 36 games (24 starts), he averaged 10.5 points and 7.6 rebounds in 25.6 minutes per game. Payne was named to the Second Team All Big Ten, along with Michigan State teammates Keith Appling and Gary Harris.

Coming into his senior year, Payne was on the preseason Naismith and Wooden Award watchlists. CBS Sports selected him to the preseason Third Team All-America. He was named to the Midseason Wooden Award Top 25 watchlist. Payne was twice named Big Ten Player of the Week. He missed seven games due to an ankle injury. At the conclusion of the regular season Payne was named second-team All-Big Ten.

=== NCAA Tournament ===
The Michigan State big man scored 41 points in a 93–78 win over Delaware, setting the pace for the 2014 NCAA Tournament. Moreover, Payne shot 17 of 17 from the free-throw line, which set an NCAA Tournament record for most free throws made in a game without a miss.

=== Friendship with Lacey Holsworth ===
During the 2013–14 college basketball season, Payne's friendship with Lacey Holsworth, an 8-year-old cancer patient, gained national media attention. Their friendship started when Payne met Holsworth during a team-sponsored hospital visit in 2011 and the two began to text and talk frequently afterward. Holsworth, who had neuroblastoma, accompanied Payne at center court on Senior Night and helped him cut down the nets after 2013–14 Michigan State Spartans men's basketball team won the Big Ten men's basketball tournament. Holsworth, also known as "Princess Lacey", died from her cancer on April 8, 2014.

== Professional career ==
=== Atlanta Hawks (2014–2015) ===
On June 26, 2014, Payne was selected with the 15th overall pick in the 2014 NBA draft by the Atlanta Hawks. On July 25, he signed his rookie scale contract with the Hawks after averaging 12.5 points and 7.0 rebounds during the 2014 NBA Summer League. After managing five preseason games for the Hawks, he was ruled out for the start of the regular season with plantar fasciitis in his left foot. He subsequently missed the first ten games of the season with the injury, and upon his return, he was assigned to the Fort Wayne Mad Ants of the NBA Development League on November 20. He was recalled by the Hawks on November 23, reassigned on November 28, and recalled again on December 6.

With the maximum allowance of four NBA players already being on assignment to the Mad Ants, the flexible assignment rule was used on December 9 so the Hawks could assign Payne to the Austin Spurs, the San Antonio Spurs' one-to-one D-League affiliate. On December 22, he was recalled by the Hawks, going on to make his long-awaited NBA debut four days later against the Milwaukee Bucks. He recorded 2 points and 3 rebounds in 13 minutes of action as the Hawks lost 107–77. On December 30, the flexible assignment rule was again used to assign Payne to Austin. He was recalled again on January 12, 2015.

=== Minnesota Timberwolves (2015–2017) ===
On February 10, 2015, Payne was traded to the Minnesota Timberwolves in exchange for a protected future first-round pick. On March 9, 2015, while starting in place of Kevin Garnett, he had a season-best game with 16 points, and 15 rebounds in an 89–76 loss to the Los Angeles Clippers.

On October 21, 2015, the Timberwolves exercised their third-year team option on Payne's rookie scale contract, extending the contract through the 2016–17 season. On January 25, 2016, using the flexible assignment rule, he was assigned to the Erie BayHawks, the D-League affiliate of the Orlando Magic. He was recalled by the Timberwolves on February 1.

On February 7, 2017, Payne was ruled out indefinitely with a blood condition, having been treated for low platelet counts. He returned to action in late March.

=== Orlando Magic (2017–2018) ===
On August 21, 2017, Payne signed a two-way contract with the Orlando Magic. Under the stipulations of the deal, he spent the majority of the 2017–18 season with Orlando's NBA G League affiliate, the Lakeland Magic. On January 26, 2018, he was waived by Orlando after his name surfaced in an alleged sexual assault dating back to his freshman year in college. After an investigation, no charges were filed.

=== Panathinaikos (2018) ===
On February 5, 2018, Payne signed with the Panathinaikos of the Greek Basketball League for the remainder of the 2017–18 season. His best game was against Spanish club Valencia recording 12 points and grabbing 8 rebounds in 17 minutes. In the last game of the EuroLeague regular season, against Olimpia Milano, he started for the first time. He finished the regular season averaging 3.5 points and 4 rebounds a game in a total of eight matches played.

=== Nanjing Tongxi Monkey King (2018–2019) ===
Payne started the season 2018–19 with the Nanjing Tongxi Monkey King of the Chinese Basketball Association, where he averaged 16.9 points and 8.6 rebounds per game.

=== Return to Panathinaikos (2019) ===
On January 12, 2019, Payne and Panathinaikos reached an agreement that would bring the player back in Greece for a second stint with the EuroLeague club. On January 13, 2019, Panathinaikos signed the center to a deal for the remainder of the season. On February 17, 2019, Payne helped Panathinaikos BC to win the Greek Basketball Cup title against PAOK BC (79–73). The final was held in Heraklion, Sports Indoor Arena, Crete. Payne's second stint with the Greek club proved to be briefer than his first, as he was released on March 13, 2019.

=== ASVEL (2019–2020) ===
On March 19, 2019, ASVEL Basket of the French LNB Pro A announced that they had signed Payne. With ASVEL, Payne won the 2019 Pro A championship as well as the French Cup that year.

=== Ormanspor (2021) ===
On February 25, 2021, Payne signed with OGM Ormanspor of the Turkish Basketbol Süper Ligi (BSL).

=== Juventus (2021–2022) ===
In December 2021, Payne signed with the Juventus Utena of the Lithuanian Basketball League. He averaged 8.6 points, 4.6 rebounds and 1.1 steals per game. Payne parted ways with the team on February 17, 2022.

== Career statistics ==
Legend
GP	Games played	GS	Games started	MPG	Minutes per game
FG%	Field goal percentage	3P%	3-point field goal percentage	FT%	Free throw percentage
RPG	Rebounds per game	APG	Assists per game	SPG	Steals per game
BPG	Blocks per game	PPG	Points per game	**Bold**	Career high

=== NBA ===
Year	Team	GP	GS	MPG	FG%	3P%	FT%	RPG	APG	SPG	BPG	PPG
2014–15	Atlanta	3	0	6.3	.286	.000	.500	1.3	.0	.3	.0	1.7
2014–15	Minnesota	29	**22**	**24.8**	.418	.125	.659	**5.4**	**1.0**	**.6**	.3	**7.2**
2015–16	Minnesota	**52**	2	9.3	.366	.281	.654	2.1	.6	.3	.2	2.5
2016–17	Minnesota	18	0	7.5	.426	.200	.737	1.8	.4	.4	**.4**	3.5
2017–18	Orlando	5	0	8.6	**.700**	**.667**	**.833**	1.8	.0	.4	.0	4.2
Career		107	24	13.1	.406	.254	.680	2.9	.6	.4	.3	4.0

=== EuroLeague ===
Year	Team	GP	GS	MPG	FG%	3P%	FT%	RPG	APG	SPG	BPG	PPG	PIR
2017–18	Panathinaikos	12	1	9.5	.579	.000	.542	2.8	0.2	0.3	0.3	4.8	4.2
Career		12	1	9.5	.579	.000	.542	2.8	0.2	0.3	0.3	4.8	4.2

== Death ==
On May 9, 2022, Payne was fatally shot in Orlando, Florida, after he and his girlfriend had travelled to the home of Lawrence Dority in an attempt to prevent a domestic dispute. Payne was transported to a hospital where he was pronounced dead. Dority claimed he felt threatened by Payne's 6'10" height and believed Payne was reaching for a weapon, but he was arrested and charged with first-degree murder after police determined that Payne had not posed a threat. Dority was convicted of second-degree murder and sentenced to life in prison.

== See also ==
- List of basketball players who died during their careers
