= Ohio Library Council =

Professional association for librarians in Ohio

- Formation: February 27, 1895; 131 years ago
- Tax ID no.: 31-1366188
- Headquarters: Columbus, Ohio
- Parent organization: American Library Association
- Website: olc.org

The Ohio Library Council (OLC) is a professional organization for Ohio's librarians and library workers. It is headquartered in Columbus, Ohio. It was founded originally as the Ohio Library Association on February 27, 1895, by William Howard Brett, Electra Collins Doren and Linda Eastman. The first OLA conference was held the same year in Cleveland, Ohio. The Ohio Library Council was incorporated as a federated organization consisting of the Ohio Library Association, Ohio Library Trustees Association (est. 1930), and Ohio Friends of the Library Association (est. 1973).

OLC is run by a board of directors made up of three degreed library employees, three current library trustees, and seven at-large members. OLC is also governed by members who participate in the activities of the association’s Committees and Divisions.

OLC's Teen Division created the James Cook Book Award: Celebrating Diversity in Teen Literature, awarded annually since 2007.

== Publications ==
- Standards for Public Library Service in Ohio (2010)
- Ohio Public Library Accounting Handbook – Fifth Edition (2014)
- Ohio Public Library Administrator’s Handbook – Fifth Edition (2014)
- Ballot Issues Handbook – Volume I, Campaigns 101: The Nuts and Bolts (2017)
- Friends Across Ohio (2017)
- Ohio Public Library Trustees’ Handbook – Fourth Edition (2017)

== See also ==
- List of libraries in the United States
