= Electra Collins Doren =

Suffragette and library scientist

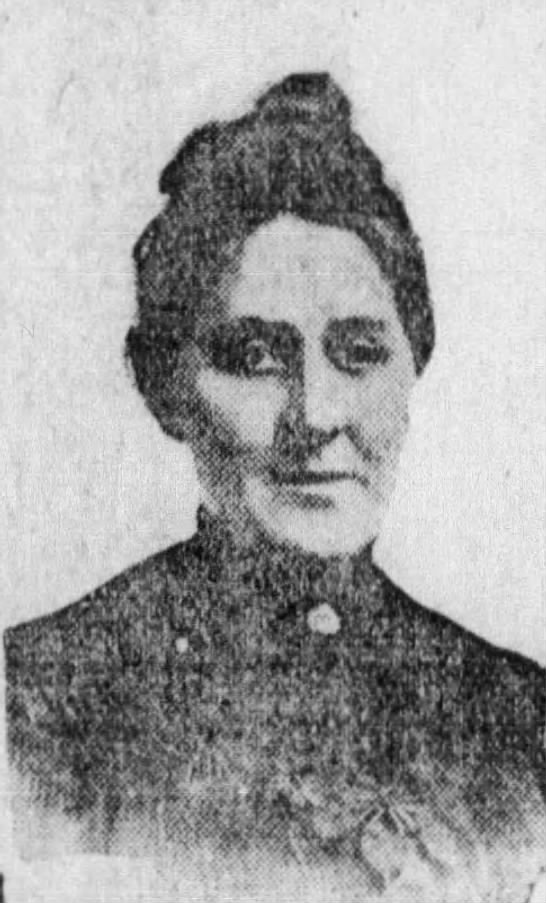
- Born: December 4, 1861; Georgetown, Ohio
- Died: March 4, 1927 (aged 65)
- Education: Cooper Female Seminary, Library School of Albany, New York
- Occupations: Librarian, Suffragist

Electra Collins Doren (December 4, 1861 – March 4, 1927) was a suffragist and library scientist who started the United States' first book wagon service. She was the longtime director of the Dayton Public Library and Museum in the early 20th century.

== Early life and education ==
Electra Collins Doren, often referred to as Electra C. Doren, was born on December 4, 1861, in Georgetown, Ohio, to John Gates and Elizabeth (Bragdon) Doren. She graduated from the Cooper Female Seminary in Dayton, Ohio, and studied at the Library School of Albany, New York.

== Career ==
Doren began work at the Dayton Public Library (later known as the Dayton Public Library and Museum, and now known as Dayton Metro Library) in 1879. In 1897, she became the library's director ("Librarian") and instituted a number of new programs, including a school library department, a library training school and a reorganization that saw titles for the first time filed using the Dewey Decimal System. The institution of the Dewey Decimal System opened the library for public use for the first time and allowed for the country's first book wagon service, which took books to rural areas of the community.

Doren left Dayton in 1905 and became the first director of the Western Reserve University Library School. Following the Great Dayton Flood (part of the Great Flood of 1913), she returned to Dayton as head Librarian, where she aided library staff in recovering items damaged by the flood, allowing the library to reopen just three months after the flood waters receded. During her two terms as head Librarian, a position she held until her death in 1927, she expanded the collection from 36,000 books to 185,000 and increased the budget from $64,000 to $225,000.

From 1917-1920 she served as a member of the American Library Association Executive Board. She also served on the ALA's War Service Committee, where she chose books that soldiers at home and in active duty could read, as well as being in charge of the financing and general direction of camp library service in America and overseas. Doren later founded the Ohio Library Association, serving for a year as its president, and was a vice president with the American Library Association.

== Death and legacy ==
She died on March 4, 1927. Upon her death, her younger sister, Elizabeth B. Doren (DPL's Head of Acquisition), took over as Acting Librarian until a new Librarian was hired (Paul North Rice).

The Electra C. Doren branch library of the Dayton Metro Library system (once shortened as "E.C. Doren") is named in her honor. The branch was renovated starting in 2014 as a result of a community support bond passed in 2012.

As a suffragette, Doren collected materials related to women's suffrage for her library work, which later formed the basis for the Dayton Metro Library's Women's Suffrage Collection, which hosts the largest collection of materials on the topic in the United States. For her efforts related to suffrage and libraries, she was inducted into the Ohio Women's Hall of Fame, the Ohio Library Hall of Fame and the Dayton Walk of Fame.

== Writing ==
- "Public Library Work for Public Schools", Journal of Proceedings and Addresses of the Forty-Second Annual Meeting Held at Boston, Massachusetts July 6–10, 1903. National Education Association (1903).
- "The Library and the School: Work Now Done", Papers and Proceedings of the Twenty-Fifth General Meeting of the American Library Association held at Niagara Falls, NY June 22–26, 1903. American Library Association (1903).
