= Jefferson Township High School (Dayton, Ohio) =

High school in Ohio, United States

Coordinates: 39°42′24″N 84°18′36″W

Location
- 2701 South Union Road; Dayton, (Montgomery County), Ohio 45417; United States

Information
- Type: Public high school
- School district: Jefferson Township Local School District
- Principal: Chris Caldwell
- Staff: 7.00 (FTE)
- Enrollment: 128 (2024-2025)
- Student to teacher ratio: 18.29
- Colors: Royal blue and gold
- Nickname: Broncos
- Website: https://jrsr.jeffersontwp.k12.oh.us/

Jefferson Township High School is a public high school located near Dayton, Ohio. It is the only high school in the Jefferson Township Local School District. Their nickname is the Broncos.

The school was mentioned in the Kurt Vonnegut novel Breakfast of Champions.

== Ohio High School Athletic Association State Championships ==
- Basketball - 1979,1998,2010
- Boys Track and Field – 1957,1977,1980,1983,1986,1987,1988,1994,2004
- Girls Track and Field – 1976,1977,1979

== Notable alumni ==
- John W. Griffin, perennial candidate for various local, state, and federal offices in Ohio
- Cody Latimer, NFL wide receiver
- Manning Marable, professor, columnist, and Pulitzer Prize winning author of Malcolm X: A Life of Reinvention
- Adreian Payne, professional basketball player (NBA)
- Al Tucker, former professional basketball player (NBA)
- Jeffrey Graves, hall of famer. Retired FAA manager (FAA)
