= Butler High School (Vandalia, Ohio) =

Coordinates: 39.885°N 84.197°W

Location
- 600 S. Dixie Dr. Vandalia, Montgomery, Ohio 45377-2594; United States

Information
- Type: Public secondary
- School district: Vandalia-Butler City School District
- Principal: Matthew "Buck" Williamson
- Teaching staff: 48.00 (FTE)
- Grades: 9–12
- Enrollment: 903 (2023-2024)
- Student to teacher ratio: 18.81
- Colours: Purple and Gold
- Athletics conference: Miami Valley League
- Mascot: Aviator
- Website: butler.vbcsd.com

Butler High School is a public high school in Vandalia, Ohio, a suburb of Dayton. The school is the only high school in the Vandalia-Butler City Schools district. The school mascot is the aviator. Butler has been rated as "Excellent" since 2005 by the Ohio Department of Education. The school met all 12 of the state indicators for the 2005–2006 school year. As of 2019–20, they are a part of the Miami Division of the Miami Valley League (MVL) athletic conference.

== History ==
On October 3, 2026, President Donald Trump held a rally in the Student Activity Center to campaign for Republican candidates ahead of the 2026 Ohio elections.

== Athletics ==
The Butler Aviators are a member of the Miami Valley League.

=== OHSAA State Championships ===
- Boys Bowling - 2019
- Girls Bowling - 2025

== Notable alumni ==
- Josh Betts - Former National Football League Quarterback
- Dan Carter - Former Member of Connecticut House of Representatives and 2016 Candidate for U.S. Senate
- Taylor Decker - Detroit Lions Offensive tackle, and 2016 NFL draft 1st round pick
- Kaden Echeman - professional baseball player
- John Goldsberry - retired professional basketball player
- Schellas Hyndman - Former Head Coach of Major League Soccer's FC Dallas
- Boston Smith - professional baseball player
- James Swearingen - American composer and arranger.
- Cory Vance - Former Major League Baseball Pitcher
