= Taylor Decker =

American football player (born 1993)

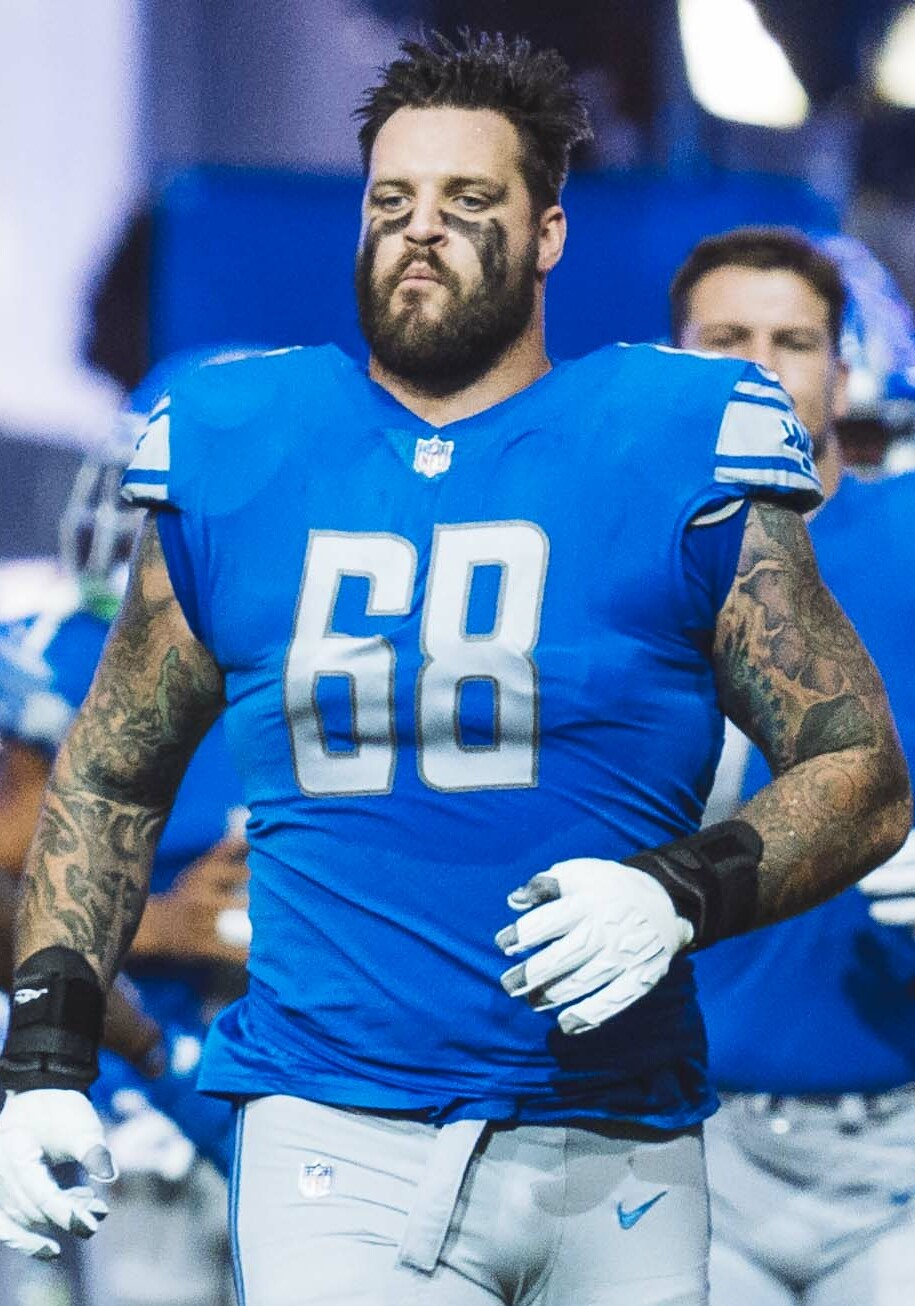
- Decker with the Detroit Lions in 2022

Profile
- Position: Offensive tackle

Personal information
- Born: August 23, 1993 (age 33); Vandalia, Ohio, U.S.
- Listed height: 6 ft 7 in (2.01 m)
- Listed weight: 324 lb (147 kg)

Career information
- High school: Butler (Vandalia)
- College: Ohio State (2012–2015)
- NFL draft: 2016: 1st round, 16th overall pick

Career history
- Detroit Lions (2016–2025)

Awards and highlights
- Pro Bowl (2024); PFWA All-Rookie Team (2016); CFP national champion (2014); Consensus All-American (2015); Big Ten Offensive Lineman of the Year (2015); First-team All-Big Ten (2015); Second-team All-Big Ten (2014)

Career NFL statistics as of 2025
- Games played: 140
- Games started: 140
- Receptions: 3
- Receiving yards: 15
- Receiving touchdowns: 2
- Stats at Pro Football Reference

Taylor Decker (born August 23, 1993) is an American professional football offensive tackle. He played college football for the Ohio State Buckeyes, where he was a consensus All-American. He was selected by the Detroit Lions in the first round of the 2016 NFL draft.

== Early life ==
Decker attended Butler High School in Vandalia, Ohio. He was a three-year starter for the football team as a left tackle. He was rated by Rivals.com as a four-star recruit and was ranked as the 23rd-best offensive tackle in his class. He originally committed to the University of Notre Dame to play college football but changed to Ohio State University. In addition to football, Decker played basketball in high school.

== College career ==
Decker played in all 12 games as a true freshman in the 2012 season. He played mostly special teams, but played 22 snaps on offense. Decker took over as a starter his sophomore season in the 2013 season, starting all 14 games at the right tackle position. Decker moved from right tackle to left tackle his junior year in 2014 and was the Buckeyes only returning starter on the offensive line. He started all 15 games, including the 2015 College Football Playoff National Championship victory over Oregon.

== Professional career ==
Pre-draft measurables
Height	Weight	Arm length	Hand span	Wingspan	40-yard dash	10-yard split	20-yard split	20-yard shuttle	Three-cone drill	Vertical jump	Broad jump	Bench press
6 ft 7 in (2.01 m)	310 lb (141 kg)	33 3/4 in (0.86 m)	10 in (0.25 m)	6 ft 8 1/8 in (2.04 m)	5.23 s	1.80 s	3.02 s	4.76 s	7.70 s	29.0 in (0.74 m)	8 ft 5 in (2.57 m)	22 reps
All values from NFL Combine/Pro Day

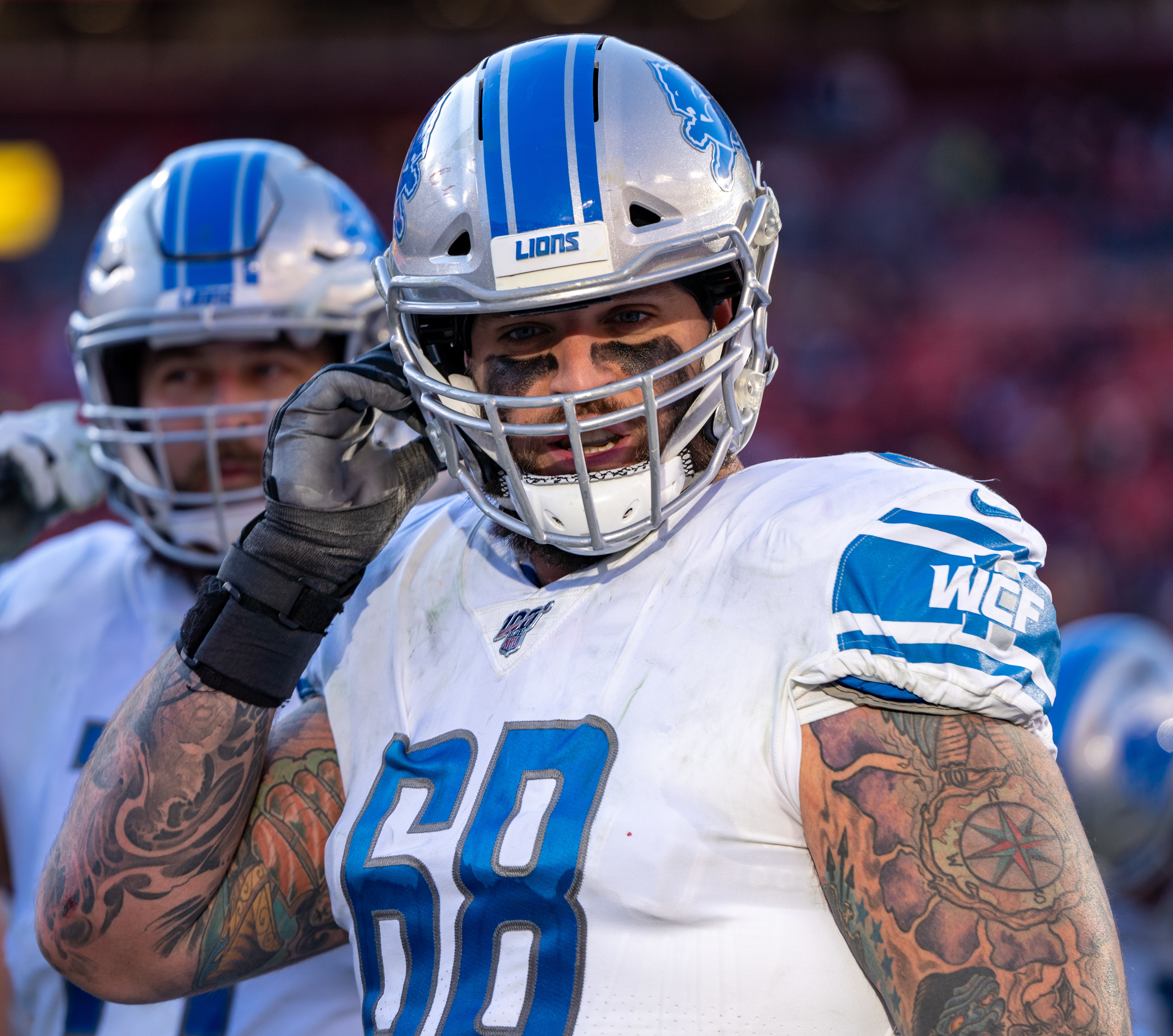
Decker in 2019

Decker was selected in the first round with the 16th overall pick by the Detroit Lions in the 2016 NFL draft.

On May 6, 2016, the Lions signed Decker to a fully guaranteed four-year, $10.96 million contract with a signing bonus of $6.17 million. Decker started all 16 games at the left tackle position in his rookie season and was the only player besides quarterback Matthew Stafford to play every snap on offense for the Lions. He was named to the PFWA All-Rookie Team. Decker was named the Lions Rookie of the Year for 2016 in voting by the Detroit Sports Broadcasters Association.

On June 6, 2017, it was revealed that Decker had undergone shoulder surgery, and was ruled out for four to six months. He was placed on the physically unable to perform (PUP) list to start the 2017 season. He was activated off PUP on November 11, 2017, and started the final eight games of the season at left tackle.

On December 2, 2018, Decker caught a touchdown pass from Matthew Stafford, when celebrating for the touchdown he threw the football into the stands. After the game Decker tweeted that this touchdown was his first touchdown ever, and he had been playing football since the first grade, and requested that he could get in contact with the fan who caught it. On December 3, 2018, Decker was put in contact with the fan that caught it and got his first ever touchdown ball back.

On April 29, 2019, the Lions exercised the fifth-year option on Decker's contract.

On September 1, 2020, Decker signed a five-year, $70.35 million contract extension with the Lions. Decker revealed in an interview with Pardon My Take, that he played the start of the 2020 season with appendicitis.

On September 11, 2021, Decker was placed on injured reserve after undergoing finger surgery. He was activated on November 2, 2021. He appeared in and started nine games in the 2021 season.

On January 2, 2022, in a game against the Seattle Seahawks, Decker scored his second career touchdown on a pass from Tim Boyle. Decker was awarded the 2022 media-friendly Good Guy Award by the Detroit Sports Media Association and Detroit chapter of the Pro Football Writers Association. In the 2022 season, he started in all 17 games. In the 2023 season, he appeared in and started 15 games.

On July 29, 2024, Decker and the Lions agreed to a three–year, $60 million contract extension. In the 2024 season, he appeared in and started 14 games.

In the 2025 season, Decker appeared in and started 14 games.

On March 6, 2026, Decker requested the Lions release him and released a statement explaining his reasoning on his personal Instagram account, "Things change, 145 games started, 3 playoff appearances, 2 division titles, a decade carrying the shield. I fully intended to do it once again, but my time as a Lion is coming to an end. In the weeks since notifying the team of my return there have been numerous discussions. Many of which were a surprise to me, and we could not find common ground. Therefore I decided to request my release." He was officially released on March 9.

=== NFL career statistics ===
Year	Team	Games		Offense						
Year	Team	GP	GS	Snaps	Pct	Holding	False start	Decl/Pen	Acpt/Pen	TD
2016	DET	16	16	1,037	100%	3	3	2	6	0
2017	DET	8	8	471	97%	1	2	3	3	0
2018	DET	16	16	1,062	99%	2	3	2	5	1
2019	DET	15	15	1,017	100%	5	3	2	8	0
2020	DET	16	16	1,046	100%	1	5	0	6	0
2021	DET	9	9	529	95%	2	4	1	6	1
2022	DET	17	17	1,142	100%	2	4	0	6	0
2023	DET	15	15	1,042	100%	1	4	0	7	0
2024	DET	14	14	895	96%	0	1	2	1	0
2025	DET	14	14	893	97%	1	3	1	4	0
Career		140	140	9,134	98%	18	32	13	52	2
