= Harries, Ohio =

Community in Ohio, United States

Coordinates: 39°46′41″N 84°8′20″W

Harries is a historic community in Montgomery County, in the U.S. state of Ohio.

== History ==
A mill was first built at Harries around 1820; the place was later called Smithville, after George W. Smith bought the property.

Other early variant names were Harries Station, Harriesville, Harshman, Harshmansville, and Harshmanville. A post office called Harshmanville was established in 1850, the name was changed to Harshman in 1885, and the post office closed in 1914. Harries and Harshman were the names of the proprietors of local mills and other enterprises.

The community was located in Mad River Township, which incorporated as the city of Riverside in 1995.
