= New Lebanon, Ohio =

- Village
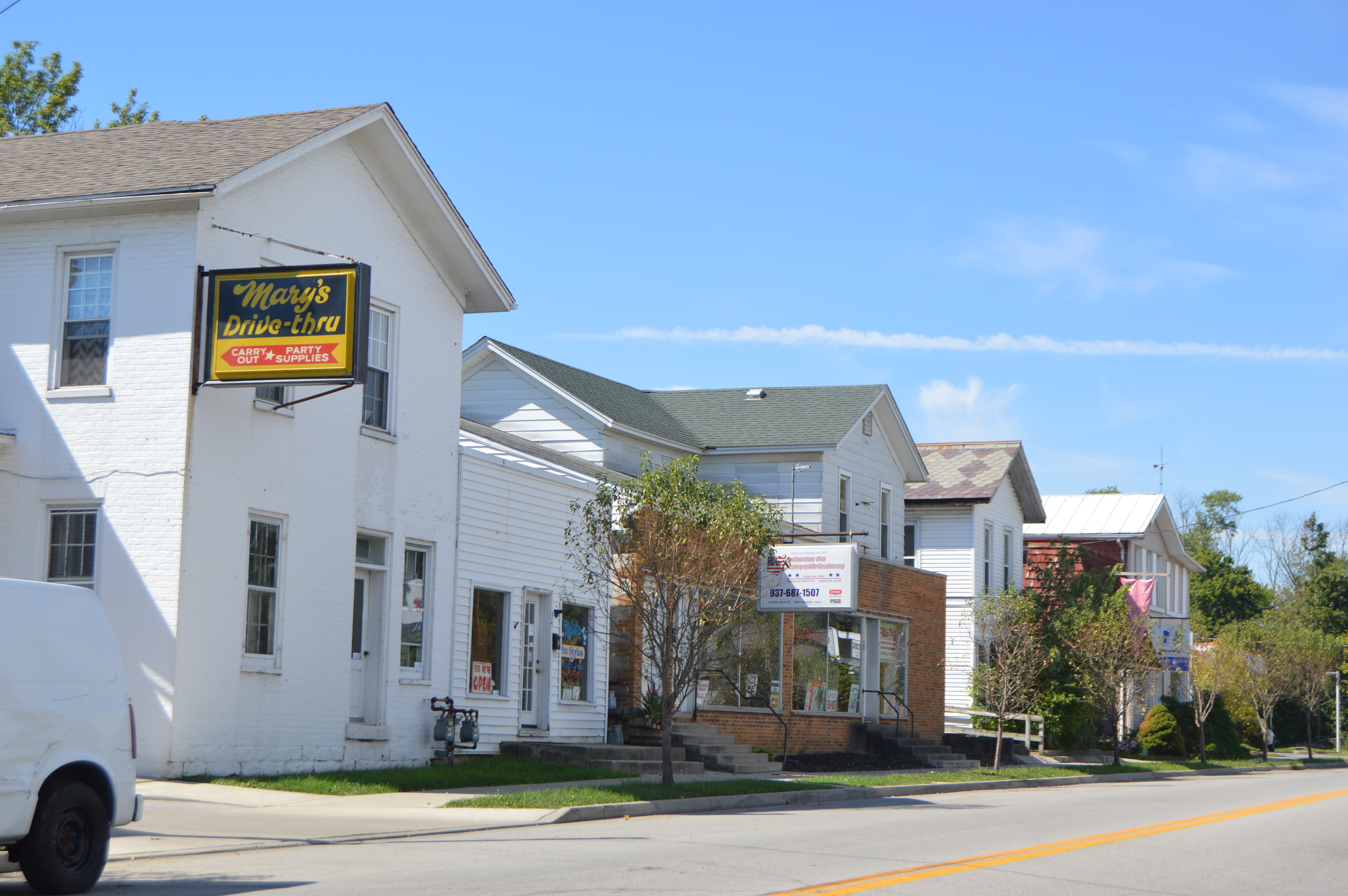
- Main Street

- Seal
- Motto: "A Caring and Sharing Community"
- Location in Montgomery County and the state of Ohio.
- Coordinates: 39°44′45″N 84°23′37″W
- Country: United States
- State: Ohio
- County: Montgomery

Government
  - Mayor: David Nickerson

Area
  - Total: 2.05 sq mi (5.30 km^{2})
  - Land: 2.05 sq mi (5.30 km^{2})
  - Water: 0 sq mi (0.00 km^{2})
- Elevation: 922 ft (281 m)

Population (2020)
  - Total: 3,796
  - Density: 1,856.3/sq mi (716.74/km^{2})
- Time zone: UTC-5 (Eastern (EST))
  - Summer (DST): UTC-4 (EDT)
- ZIP code: 45345
- Area codes: 937, 326
- FIPS code: 39-54852
- GNIS feature ID: 2399469
- Website: https://www.newlebanonoh.org/

New Lebanon is a village in Montgomery County, Ohio, United States. The population was 3,796 at the 2020 census. It is part of the Dayton Metropolitan Statistical Area.

== History ==
New Lebanon was platted in 1843. A post office called Medill was established in 1847, and the name was changed to New Lebanon in 1849. New Lebanon was incorporated as a village in 1878, though its village charter didn't go into effect until January 1, 1979, officially establishing it as a municipality.

== Geography ==
According to the United States Census Bureau, the village has a total area of 2.05 square miles (5.31 km^{2}), all land.

== Demographics ==
Historical population
| Census | Pop. | Note | %± |
|---|---|---|---|
| 1880 | 76 | | — |
| 1890 | 149 | | 96.1% |
| 1900 | 145 | | −2.7% |
| 1910 | 202 | | 39.3% |
| 1920 | 273 | | 35.1% |
| 1930 | 509 | | 86.4% |
| 1940 | 534 | | 4.9% |
| 1950 | 696 | | 30.3% |
| 1960 | 1,459 | | 109.6% |
| 1970 | 4,248 | | 191.2% |
| 1980 | 4,501 | | 6.0% |
| 1990 | 4,323 | | −4.0% |
| 2000 | 4,231 | | −2.1% |
| 2010 | 3,995 | | −5.6% |
| 2020 | 3,796 | | −5.0% |
U.S. Decennial Census

=== 2020 census ===
As of the 2020 census, New Lebanon had a population of 3,796. The median age was 38.8 years. 24.2% of residents were under the age of 18 and 19.3% of residents were 65 years of age or older. For every 100 females there were 95.4 males, and for every 100 females age 18 and over there were 89.8 males age 18 and over.

0.0% of residents lived in urban areas, while 100.0% lived in rural areas.

There were 1,548 households in New Lebanon, of which 31.8% had children under the age of 18 living in them. Of all households, 42.1% were married-couple households, 19.1% were households with a male householder and no spouse or partner present, and 29.5% were households with a female householder and no spouse or partner present. About 29.6% of all households were made up of individuals and 14.2% had someone living alone who was 65 years of age or older.

There were 1,652 housing units, of which 6.3% were vacant. The homeowner vacancy rate was 2.1% and the rental vacancy rate was 5.6%.

Racial composition as of the 2020 census
| Race | Number | Percent |
|---|---|---|
| White | 3,510 | 92.5% |
| Black or African American | 30 | 0.8% |
| American Indian and Alaska Native | 7 | 0.2% |
| Asian | 18 | 0.5% |
| Native Hawaiian and Other Pacific Islander | 1 | 0.0% |
| Some other race | 29 | 0.8% |
| Two or more races | 201 | 5.3% |
| Hispanic or Latino (of any race) | 46 | 1.2% |

=== 2010 census ===
As of the census of 2010, there were 3,995 people, 1,527 households, and 1,057 families living in the village. The population density was 1,948.8 inhabitants per square mile (752.4/km^{2}). There were 1,659 housing units at an average density of 809.3 per square mile (312.5/km^{2}). The racial makeup of the village was 96.2% White, 1.2% African American, 0.1% Native American, 0.4% Asian, 0.1% from other races, and 2.0% from two or more races. Hispanic or Latino of any race were 0.7% of the population.

There were 1,527 households, of which 36.7% had children under the age of 18 living with them, 48.7% were married couples living together, 14.5% had a female householder with no husband present, 6.0% had a male householder with no wife present, and 30.8% were non-families. 26.5% of all households were made up of individuals, and 11.3% had someone living alone who was 65 years of age or older. The average household size was 2.55 and the average family size was 3.08.

The median age in the village was 36.9 years. 26.3% of residents were under the age of 18; 9.1% were between the ages of 18 and 24; 24.5% were from 25 to 44; 24.9% were from 45 to 64; and 15.2% were 65 years of age or older. The gender makeup of the village was 48.3% male and 51.7% female.

=== 2000 census ===
As of the census of 2000, there were 4,231 people, 1,574 households, and 1,166 families living in the village. The population density was 2,117.0 inhabitants per square mile (817.4/km^{2}). There were 1,655 housing units at an average density of 828.1 per square mile (319.7/km^{2}). The racial makeup of the village was 98.46% White, 0.33% African American, 0.09% Native American, 0.17% Asian, 0.24% from other races, and 0.71% from two or more races. Hispanic or Latino of any race were 0.76% of the population.

There were 1,574 households, out of which 37.2% had children under the age of 18 living with them, 56.9% were married couples living together, 13.0% had a female householder with no husband present, and 25.9% were non-families. 23.0% of all households were made up of individuals, and 9.5% had someone living alone who was 65 years of age or older. The average household size was 2.61 and the average family size was 3.07.

In the village, the population was spread out, with 28.4% under the age of 18, 7.2% from 18 to 24, 29.8% from 25 to 44, 20.3% from 45 to 64, and 14.3% who were 65 years of age or older. The median age was 35 years. For every 100 females there were 89.6 males. For every 100 females age 18 and over, there were 87.1 males.

The median income for a household in the village was $40,801, and the median income for a family was $44,063. Males had a median income of $32,188 versus $25,057 for females. The per capita income for the village was $16,718. About 3.3% of families and 5.4% of the population were below the poverty line, including 3.2% of those under age 18 and 9.3% of those age 65 or over.

== Education ==
New Lebanon has a public library, a branch of the Dayton Metro Library. New Lebanon is home to the New Lebanon Local School District, consisting of an Elementary, Middle, and High School (Dixie High School).
