= Taylorsburg, Ohio =

Coordinates: 39°49′51″N 84°17′34″W

Taylorsburg is a neighborhood of the city of Trotwood in northwestern Montgomery County, Ohio, United States.

== History ==
A post office called Taylorsburgh was established in 1880, the name was changed to Taylorsburg in 1893, and the post office closed in 1915. In 1909, Taylorsburg had 135 inhabitants.
