= Vandalia, Ohio =

- City
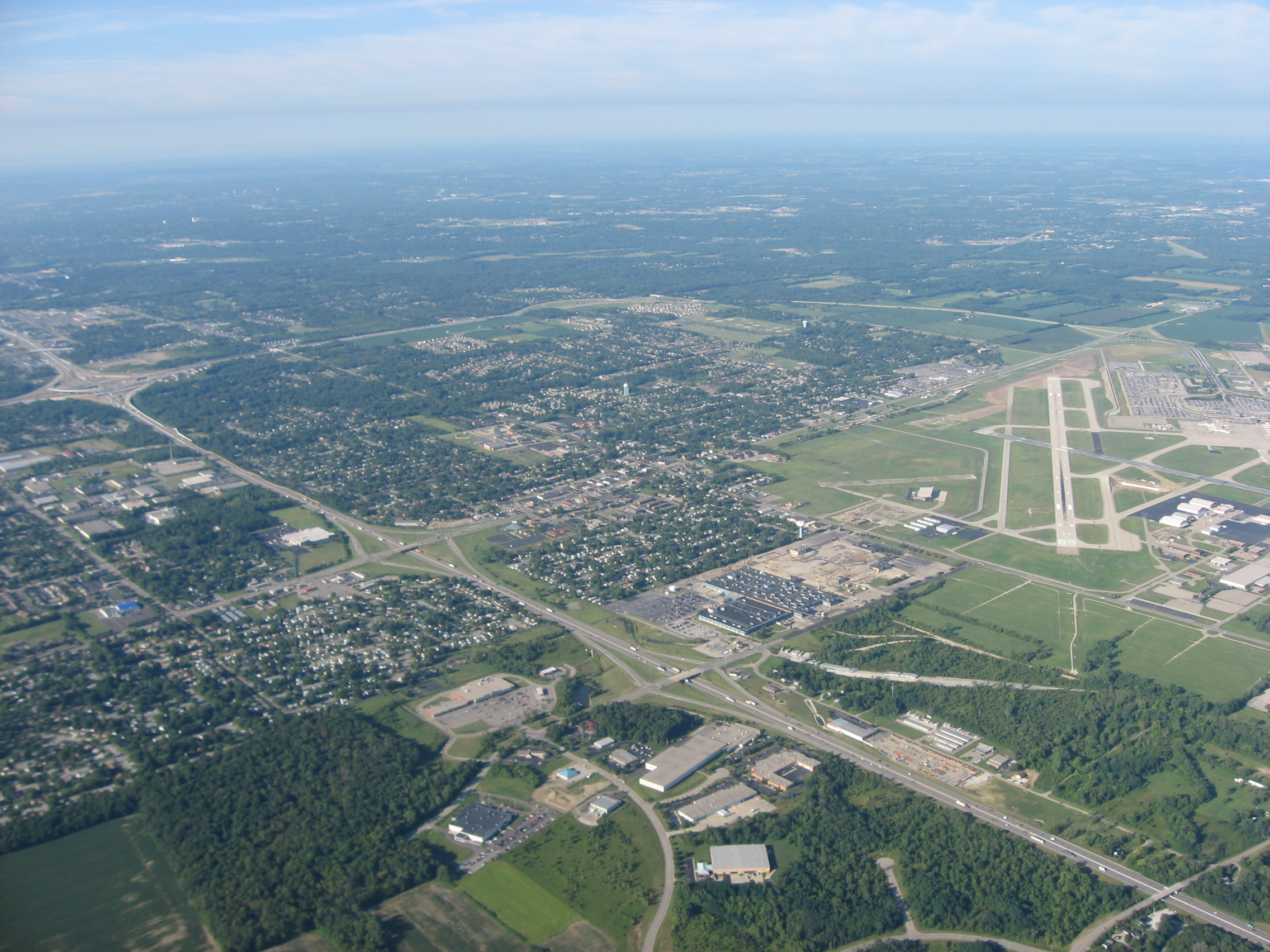
- Aerial view of Vandalia, with Dayton International Airport to the north

- Flag Seal Logo
- Interactive map of Vandalia, Ohio
- Location within Ohio Location within the United States
- Coordinates: 39°52′40″N 84°11′35″W
- Country: United States
- State: Ohio
- County: Montgomery

Area
  - Total: 12.39 sq mi (32.09 km^{2})
  - Land: 12.35 sq mi (31.98 km^{2})
  - Water: 0.042 sq mi (0.11 km^{2})
- Elevation: 955 ft (291 m)

Population (2020)
  - Total: 15,209
  - Density: 1,232/sq mi (475.6/km^{2})
- Time zone: UTC-5 (Eastern (EST))
  - Summer (DST): UTC-4 (EDT)
- ZIP code: 45377
- Area codes: 937, 326
- FIPS code: 39-79492
- GNIS feature ID: 1086680
- Website: vandaliaohio.org

Vandalia is a city in Montgomery County, Ohio, United States, and a suburb of Dayton. Its population was 15,209 during the 2020 census. In addition to being the city closest to Dayton International Airport, Vandalia lies at the crossroads of I-75 and I-70.

== History ==
On August 17, 1838, Benjamin Wilhelm, a settler from Pennsylvania, settled near what is now the intersection of U.S. Route 40 and US Route 25-A. He built his home and a small general store as a stop and resting place for travelers heading west. The small town began to attract travelers and businessmen, and on February 7, 1848, the town was incorporated as "The Village of Vandalia" with Benjamin Wilhelm as its first mayor. The village was laid out in 38 lots including a church, hotels, blacksmiths shops, a steam sawmill, meat markets, and a carriage shop. It was named after Vandalia, Illinois.

By 1959, Vandalia was outgrowing its "village" status, and its citizens voted to make it a council-manager form of government, effectively making the village into a municipal corporation. On January 2, 1960, Vandalia became a Charter City of the State of Ohio.

The Delphi Automotive manufacturing plant in Vandalia, which opened in the 1930s, cut back operations in 2003. It continued to operate "through Delphi’s time in Chapter 11 bankruptcy protection, from October 2005 to October 2009," and was purchased by Mahle Behr in 2015.

Until 2005, Vandalia was home to the Amateur Trapshooting Association (ATA), which moved to Sparta, Illinois after an expansion of the Dayton International Airport.

=== Name ===
Some records indicate that Benjamin Wilhelm, the town's founder, settled in Vandalia on his way to Vandalia, Illinois. Instead, he stopped here and named his new town after his original destination. Others claim that the town was named Vandalia because the National Road was intended to extend to Vandalia, Illinois, but, for a time, it looked as though it would not do so. This doubt resulted in the name being used for a town along the Road in Ohio.

== Geography ==
Vandalia is about 10 miles (16 km) north of Dayton on Dixie Drive (former U.S. Highway 25). It is between the Great Miami River and the Stillwater River. The city has been called the "Crossroads of America" due to its location on the National Road and the Dixie Highway. These correspond to U.S. Route 40 and former U.S. Route 25, which in turn, have been supplanted by two major expressways: east-west Interstate 70 and north–south Interstate 75.

According to the United States Census Bureau, the city has a total area of 12.41 square miles (32.14 km^{2}), of which, 12.34 square miles (31.96 km^{2}) is land and 0.07 square miles (0.18 km^{2}) is water.

== Demographics ==
Historical population
Census	Pop.	Note	%±
1850	228		—
1870	313		—
1880	315		0.6%
1890	265		−15.9%
1900	284		7.2%
1910	221		−22.2%
1920	257		16.3%
1930	331		28.8%
1940	378		14.2%
1950	927		145.2%
1960	6,342		584.1%
1970	10,796		70.2%
1980	13,161		21.9%
1990	13,882		5.5%
2000	14,603		5.2%
2010	15,246		4.4%
2020	15,209		−0.2%
2025 (est.)	15,014		−1.3%

Vandalia is part of the Dayton Metropolitan Statistical Area.

=== 2020 census ===
As of the 2020 census, Vandalia had a population of 15,209. The median age was 42.3 years. 20.3% of residents were under the age of 18 and 20.1% of residents were 65 years of age or older. For every 100 females there were 95.6 males, and for every 100 females age 18 and over there were 92.7 males age 18 and over.

99.3% of residents lived in urban areas, while 0.7% lived in rural areas.

There were 6,805 households in Vandalia, of which 26.4% had children under the age of 18 living in them. Of all households, 41.9% were married-couple households, 20.7% were households with a male householder and no spouse or partner present, and 30.4% were households with a female householder and no spouse or partner present. About 34.6% of all households were made up of individuals and 14.1% had someone living alone who was 65 years of age or older.

There were 7,091 housing units, of which 4.0% were vacant. The homeowner vacancy rate was 1.1% and the rental vacancy rate was 4.4%.

Racial composition as of the 2020 census
Race	Number	Percent
White	12,911	84.9%
Black or African American	1,046	6.9%
American Indian and Alaska Native	39	0.3%
Asian	237	1.6%
Native Hawaiian and Other Pacific Islander	5	0.0%
Some other race	86	0.6%
Two or more races	885	5.8%
Hispanic or Latino (of any race)	312	2.1%

=== 2010 census ===
As of the census of 2010, there were 15,246 people, 6,571 households, and 4,166 families residing in the city. The population density was 1,235.5 inhabitants per square mile (477.0/km^{2}). There were 7,055 housing units at an average density of 571.7 per square mile (220.7/km^{2}). The racial makeup of the city was 91.5% White, 4.1% African American, 0.1% Native American, 1.4% Asian, 0.6% from other races, and 2.1% from two or more races. Hispanic or Latino of any race were 1.6% of the population.

There were 6,571 households, of which 30.0% had children under the age of 18 living with them, 46.5% were married couples living together, 12.3% had a female householder with no husband present, 4.7% had a male householder with no wife present, and 36.6% were non-families. 31.1% of all households were made up of individuals, and 10.2% had someone living alone who was 65 years of age or older. The average household size was 2.30 and the average family size was 2.88.

The median age in the city was 40.6 years. 23.1% of residents were under the age of 18; 8.3% were between the ages of 18 and 24; 24.2% were from 25 to 44; 28.7% were from 45 to 64, and 15.7% were 65 years of age or older. The gender makeup of the city was 48.4% male and 51.6% female.

=== 2000 census ===
As of the census of 2000, there were 14,603 people, 6,235 households, and 4,090 families residing in the city. As of 2009 there were 27,298 citizens. The population density was 1,236.5 inhabitants per square mile (477.4/km^{2}). There were 6,489 housing units at an average density of 549.5 per square mile (212.2/km^{2}). The racial makeup of the city was 96.08% White, 1.28% African American, 0.13% Native American, 1.23% Asian, 0.03% Pacific Islander, 0.35% from other races, and 0.90% from two or more races. Hispanic or Latino of any race were 0.89% of the population.

There were 6,235 households, out of which 30.1% had children under the age of 18 living with them, 52.0% were married couples living together, 10.3% had a female householder with no husband present, and 34.4% were non-families. 29.8% of all households were made up of individuals, and 8.5% had someone living alone who was 65 years of age or older. The average household size was 2.32 and the average family size was 2.88.

In the city, the population was spread out, with 23.6% under the age of 18, 8.1% from 18 to 24, 29.7% from 25 to 44, 25.0% from 45 to 64, and 13.6% who were 65 years of age or older. The median age was 38 years. For every 100 females, there were 94.4 males. For every 100 females age 18 and over, there were 90.9 males.

The median income for a household in the city was $44,463, and the median income for a family was $55,270. Males had a median income of $41,938 versus $26,853 for females. The per capita income for the city was $24,199. About 3.5% of families and 5.2% of the population were below the poverty line, including 6.2% of those under age 18 and 5.4% of those age 65 or over.

== Events ==
The City of Vandalia boasts several seasonal festivals and events, such as the annual Oktoberfest in the autumn, the Homecoming parade in the fall, and the Air Show & Parade in the summer. They also host a firework show, The Star-Spangled Celebration. Other events include "Taste of Vandalia", a culinary event, and the Vandalia Corporate Challenge.

== Parks and recreation ==
Vandalia is a top-rated parks and recreation community. Vandalia has over thirty parks in the area. Some of the larger ones include Helke Park and the Vandalia Sports Complex. It is also home to the Taylorsville Metropark, home to the historic village of Tadmor. Vandalia also is home to the Bruce Sucher Recreation Center, a highly popular recreational facility.

== Education ==
Vandalia-Butler City School District is one of only two districts to win the excellency rating every year since 2005. The schools have shown constant improvement. The school district has built a new middle school designed by SHP Leading Design based in Cincinnati, and the district has also renovated and enlarged Butler High School.

The Western Ohio Japanese Language School (オハイオ西部日本語学校 Ohio Seibu Nihongo Gakkō), a part-time Japanese supplementary school, previously held its classes at the Northridge / Vandalia-Butler Preschool in Vandalia.

Vandalia has a public library, a branch of the Dayton Metro Library.

== Media ==
Vandalia has its weekly community paper, the Vandalia Drummer. The city is also covered by the Dayton Daily News, the metropolitan area's main daily newspaper.

== Notable people ==
- Josh Betts, former CFL quarterback
- Roger Clemens, seven-time Cy Young Award winner, was born in Dayton and lived in Vandalia until he was 15
- Taylor Decker, football player for the Detroit Lions
- Matt Lepay, sports broadcaster for the Wisconsin Badgers and Milwaukee Brewers
- Cory Vance, former Major League Baseball player for the Colorado Rockies

== Sister cities ==
Vandalia has two sister cities, as designated by Sister Cities International:

- – Lichtenfels, Bayern, Germany
- – Prestwick, Scotland
