= Nora Freeman Engstrom =

American legal scholar

Nora Freeman Engstrom is a legal scholar whose work focuses on tort law, legal ethics, access to justice, and complex litigation. She is the Ernest W. McFarland Professor of Law at Stanford Law School and the co-director of the Deborah L. Rhode Center on the Legal Profession.

== Early life and education ==
Growing up in South Carolina, Engstrom graduated from Irmo High School in 1993 and then from Dartmouth College in 1997. She attended Stanford Law School, where she served as an editor of the Stanford Law Review and was elected to the Order of the Coif. Engstrom graduated from Stanford Law School in 2002 and went on to clerk for Judge Henry H. Kennedy Jr. of the U.S. District Court for the District of Columbia and, after that, then-Judge Merrick B. Garland of the U.S. Court of Appeals for the District of Columbia Circuit.

Engstrom practiced law at Wilmer Cutler Pickering Hale and Dorr LLP, and in 2007, she joined Georgetown University Law Center as a Research Dean's Scholar.

== Academic career ==
In 2009, Engstrom joined the Stanford Law School faculty. She served as the Associate Dean for Curriculum between 2016 and 2018, and in 2021 was named the Ernest W. McFarland Professor of Law. Also in 2021, Engstrom became the co-director of Stanford Law School's Deborah L. Rhode Center on the Legal Profession.

Engstrom is a Reporter for the American Law Institute Third Restatement of Torts: Miscellaneous Provisions, and she served as a Reporter for the Third Restatement of Torts: Medical Malpractice. She is also an Adviser for the Civil Liability for Artificial Intelligence project and the Third Restatement of Torts: Remedies. Engstrom had previously served as Chair of the Torts and Compensation Systems Section of the American Association of Law Schools.

== Scholarship ==
Engstrom's scholarship examines the design and the operation of the civil justice system, with a particular emphasis on tort law and legal ethics. One strand of her scholarship addresses common concerns about illegitimate or fraudulent claims. Her Yale Law Journal article, The Lessons of Lone Pine, explores the use of Lone Pine orders in multidistrict litigation (MDLs) to cull illegitimate claims. Engstrom argues that, despite their popularity and perceived efficiency, there are numerous drawbacks to these case management tools that must be considered before deploying them in litigation. She has created and maintains a database of Lone Pine orders from state and federal courts to bring transparency to these often-unpublished orders. A related strand of Engstrom's scholarship considers the broader social utility of mass tort litigation, in which public health outcomes, policy and law changes, and social benefits are achieved through litigation on discrete legal issues.

Engstrom's work in legal ethics often explores the access to justice implications of the current regulatory framework governing lawyers. Much of her recent scholarship in this area is critical of the lawyer monopoly over legal services. Engstrom's 2025 article Auto Clubs and the Lost Origins of the Access to Justice Crisis, calls into question the motivations of bar association efforts in the 1930s and beyond to establish a monopoly on the delivery of legal services. Her research suggests that historical records suggesting trade protection played at least some role in the modern restrictions on who can practice law.

Engstrom co-authors three law school casebooks: Legal Ethics (now in its 8th edition); Tort Law and Alternatives (now in its 11th edition); and Legal Ethics: The Plaintiffs' Lawyers.

== Recognition ==
In 2021, Engstrom's article The Lessons of Lone Pine received Berkeley Law School Civil Justice Research Initiative's inaugural Best Article prize, and her article The Trouble with Trial Time Limits was recognized by the National Civil Justice Institute. In 2022, the American Law Institute awarded Engstrom the R. Ammi Cutter Reporter's Chair in 2022. She received a Complex Litigation Ethics Award in 2024. In 2025, the American Association of Law Schools (AALS) awarded Engstrom the William L. Prosser Award, and AALS recognized her article Auto Clubs and the Lost Origins of the Access to Justice Crisis. In 2026, the National Civil Justice Institute awarded her and her co-authors the Civil Justice Scholarship Award for their "groundbreaking" article, Shedding Light on Secret Settlements: An Empirical Study of California’s STAND Act.

== Personal life ==
Engstrom is married to fellow Stanford Law School professor David Freeman Engstrom. They have two children.
