= Morgan Place, Ohio =

- Former unincorporated community
- Location within Ohio Location within the United States
- Coordinates: 39°51′49″N 84°17′07″W
- Country: United States
- State: Ohio
- County: Montgomery
- City: Englewood
- Elevation: 830 ft (250 m)
- Time zone: UTC-5 (Eastern (EST))
  - Summer (DST): UTC-4 (EDT)
- ZIP Code: 45322 (Englewood)
- GNIS feature ID: 1048985

Morgan Place is a location within the city of Englewood in Montgomery County, in the U.S. state of Ohio.
