= Airhill, Ohio =

Unincorporated community in Ohio, U.S.

Coordinates: 39°49′10″N 84°22′3″W

Airhill is an unincorporated community in Montgomery County, in the U.S. state of Ohio.

== History ==
A post office called Air Hill was established in 1865, the name was changed to Airhill in 1895, and the post office closed in 1900. Besides the post office, Airhill had a railroad station.
