= Spanker, Ohio =

Unincorporated community in Ohio, U.S.

Coordinates: 39°51′33″N 84°14′42″W

Spanker is an unincorporated community in Montgomery County, in the U.S. state of Ohio.

== History ==
A post office called Spanker was established in 1860, and remained in operation until 1904. The community was named on account of the spanker wagons which were once made here.
