= Stebbins High School =

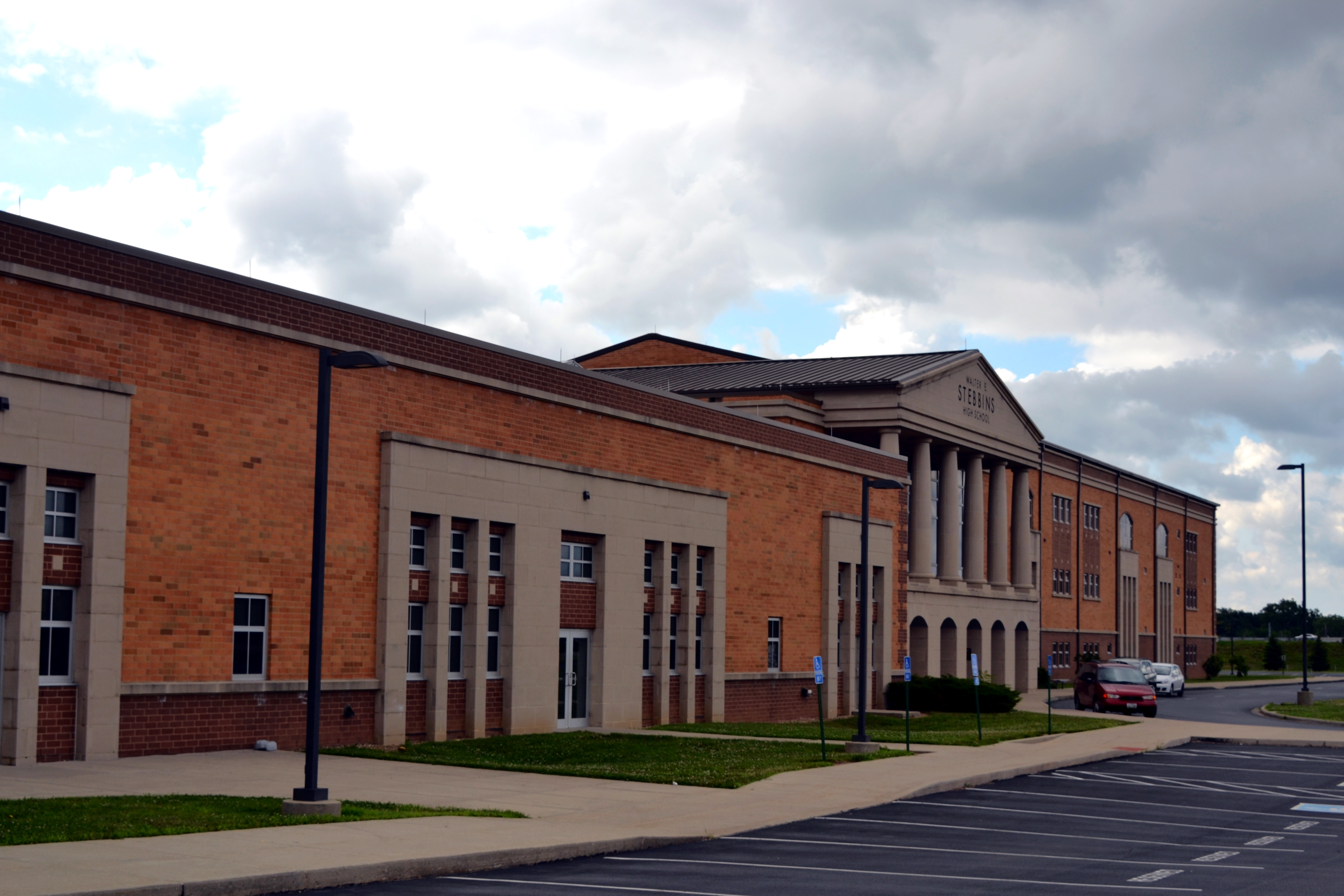
- Front of Stebbins High School

Location
- 1900 Harshman Rd. Riverside, Ohio 45424; United States; 39°47′48″N 84°07′40″W

Information
- Type: Public secondary
- Established: 1957
- School district: Mad River Local School District
- Principal: Tina Simpson
- Staff: 60.64 (FTE)
- Grades: 9-12
- Enrollment: 1,119 (2023-24)
- Student to teacher ratio: 18.45
- Colors: Scarlet and Grey
- Website: stebbinshs.madriverschools.org

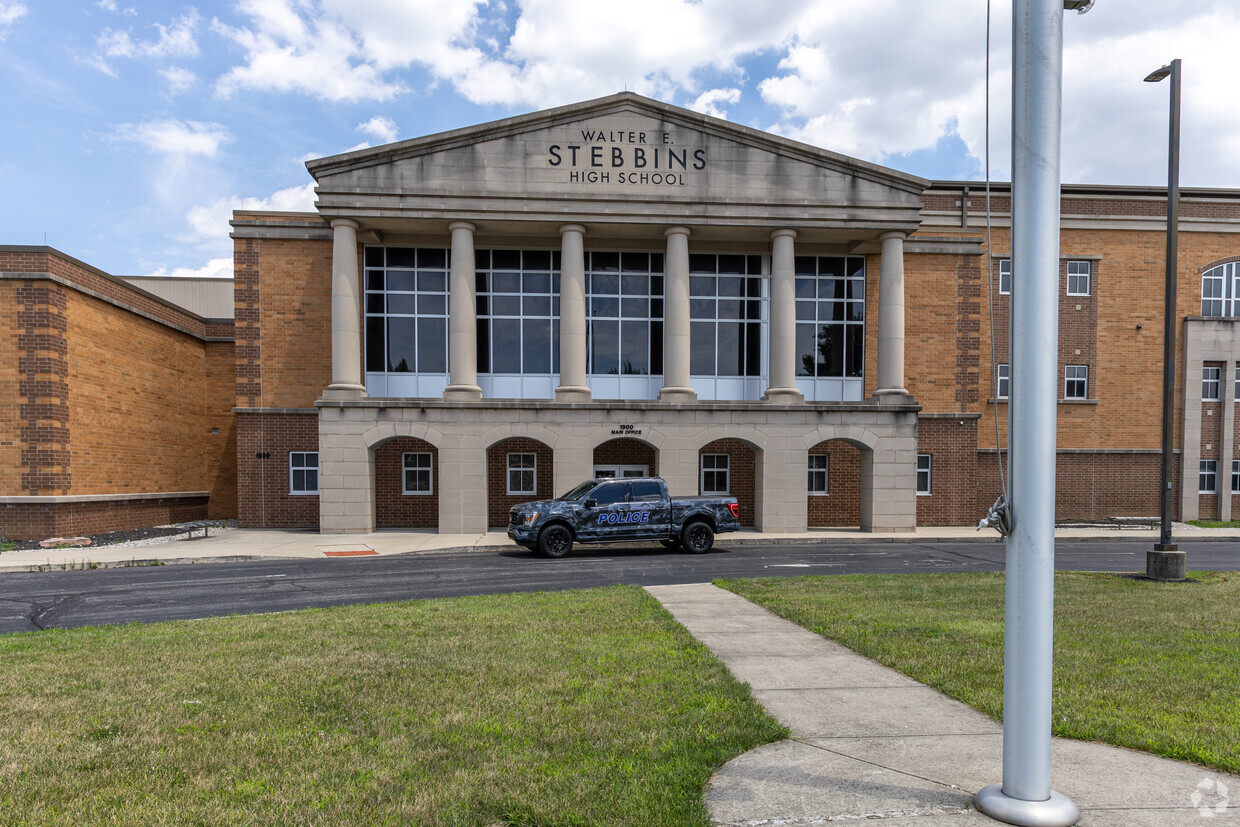

Walter E. Stebbins High School is part of the Mad River Local School District. The school is located in Riverside, Ohio, United States and serves over 1000 students. Stebbins's mascot is the Indian. The new school building was opened in August 2005. Stebbins is well known for its technical prep program, which offers a "major" for students in fields such as Graphic Design, HVAC, Construction, Manufacturing, Engineering, Nursing, Teacher Academy, Vet Science, and Sports Medicine Those who complete the two-year program also receive a scholarship to Sinclair Community College.

Stebbins met ten of the twelve state indicators for the 2010–2011 school year (missing the State targets for 10th and 11th Grade Science), earning it an "Effective" rating.

The AFJROTC red beret drill team won state titles for 18 years in a row, as well as four national titles.

On February 29, 2008, Stebbins won its first team Ohio High School Athletic Association state championship in any sport when the Boys' Bowling team beat Centerville 802–766. As of 2019–20, Stebbins is a member of the Miami Valley League (MVL).

== Notable alumni ==
- Larry Augustin, founder of VA Software
- Dave Coleman, former MLB outfielder
- David Freeman Engstrom, LSVF Professor in Law at Stanford Law School
- Joe Greene, two time Olympic bronze medalist long jumper
- Charles Michael Davis, actor
- Jamal Robertson, NFL and CFL running back
