= Dixie High School (Ohio) =

Coordinates: 39°44′31″N 84°24′06″W

Location
- 300 S. Fuls Rd. New Lebanon, Ohio 45345; United States

Information
- Type: Public secondary
- Administrator: Greg Williams
- Principal: Brad Wolgast
- Teaching staff: 24.00 (FTE)
- Grades: 9-12
- Enrollment: 301 (2023-2024)
- Student to teacher ratio: 12.54
- Colors: Scarlet & Gray
- Mascot: Greyhound
- Conference: Western Ohio Athletic Conference
- Website: https://www.newlebanonschools.org/dhs

Dixie High School is part of New Lebanon Local Schools in New Lebanon, Ohio, United States.

The school mascot is the greyhound. The stated goal at Dixie High School is to provide the instruction, technology, and resources necessary for students to acquire the knowledge and skills that enable them to become active, responsible citizens, successful employees, and informed decision makers who care and work toward a better society.

According to the Ohio Department of Education, Dixie met all 12 of the state indicators for the 2005–2006 school year, earning it a rating of "Excellent".

== Ohio High School Athletic Association State Championships ==
- Boys Basketball – 1962, 1966
