= Daniel E. Ho =

American lawyer and professor

- Education: University of California, Berkeley (BA); Harvard University (MA, PhD); Yale University (JD)
- Occupation: lawyer
- Known for: William Benjamin Scott and Luna M. Scott Professor of Law at Stanford Law School

Daniel E. Ho is an American legal scholar and political scientist who is currently the William Benjamin Scott and Luna M. Scott Professor of Law at Stanford Law School.

== Education and training ==
Ho earned his B.A. degree at the University of California, Berkeley, his Ph.D. in government at Harvard University in 2004, and his J.D. degree from Yale Law School in 2005.

== Professional experience ==
Ho clerked for Judge Stephen F. Williams, a judge on the United States Court of Appeals for the District of Columbia Circuit. He was also a postdoctoral fellow at the Institute for Quantitative Social Science at Harvard University.

== Awards and recognition ==
Ho earned the John Bingham Hurlbut Award for Excellence in Teaching and was made a Senior Fellow at the Stanford Institute for Economic Policy Research
