= New Lebanon Local School District =

School district in Ohio

New Lebanon Local Schools is a school district in New Lebanon, Ohio.

== Schools ==
- Dixie High School
- Dixie Middle School
- Dixie Elementary School
