= Mad River Local School District =

School district in Ohio

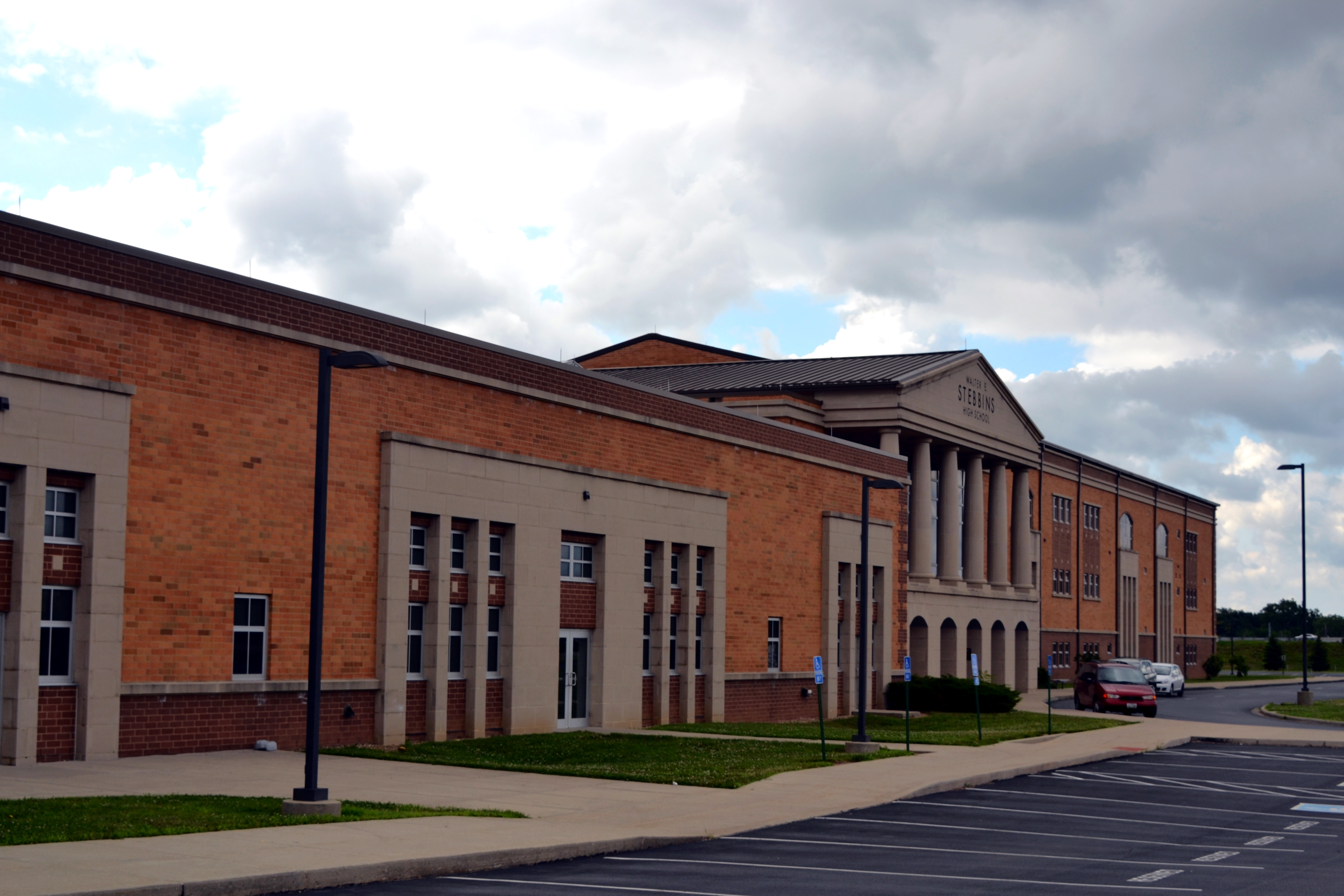
Stebbins High School

Mad River Local Schools is a school district in Riverside, Ohio.

== High schools ==
- Stebbins High School

== Middle schools ==
- Mad River Middle School
- Spinning Hills Middle School

Mad River Middle School is for grades 7 and 8 and is on Harshman Road across from Stebbins High School. The principal is Laurie Plank and the assistant principal is Brad Sims. The school is two stories with about 600 students. There is band, orchestra and chorus. All 8th-grade students take a comprehensive computer class.

Spinning Hills Middle School serves around 350 fifth and sixth graders and is on Eastman Road in Riverside, Ohio. Its principal is Mike Combs. The school features two stories and a very large playground. There is band, orchestra, chorus and general music.

== Elementary ==
The elementary schools in Mad River, which serve kindergarten through 4th grade, are:

- Beverly Gardens
- Saville
- Brantwood
- Virginia Stevenson

Each school serves 200-350 students.

== Other schools ==
- Mad River Early Childhood Center
