= Vandalia-Butler City School District =

School district in Ohio, United States

Address
- 500 South Dixie Dr Vandalia, Ohio, 45377; United States

District information
- Type: Public
- Grades: PK–12
- Schools: 6
- NCES District ID: 3904495

Students and staff
- Students: 2,880 (2025–2026)
- Teachers: 165.01 (on an FTE basis) (2025–2026)
- Staff: 356.57 (on an FTE basis) (2025–2026)
- Student–teacher ratio: 17.45 (2025–2026)

Other information
- Website: www.vbcsd.com

The Vandalia-Butler City School District serves Butler Township and Vandalia, in the U.S. state of Ohio, with an enrollment of about 3,500 students in 2005. The superintendent, as of 2017, is Robert O’Leary According to city-data.com the school system the second-strongest-rated district in the Dayton region, just behind Oakwood City Schools. The district has also won an excellent rating from the Ohio Department of Education every year since 2002 and received Excellent with Distinction, the highest rating possible for the 2008–2009 school year. The district was also named the best in Social Studies on standardized testing in the state of Ohio for 2005, 2006, 2007, 2008, 2009, 2010, and 2012.

== Schools ==
- Butler High School
- Morton Middle School
- Smith Intermediate School
- Demmitt Elementary
- Helke Early Learning Center

== See also ==
- List of school districts in Ohio
