= Riverside, Ohio =

- City
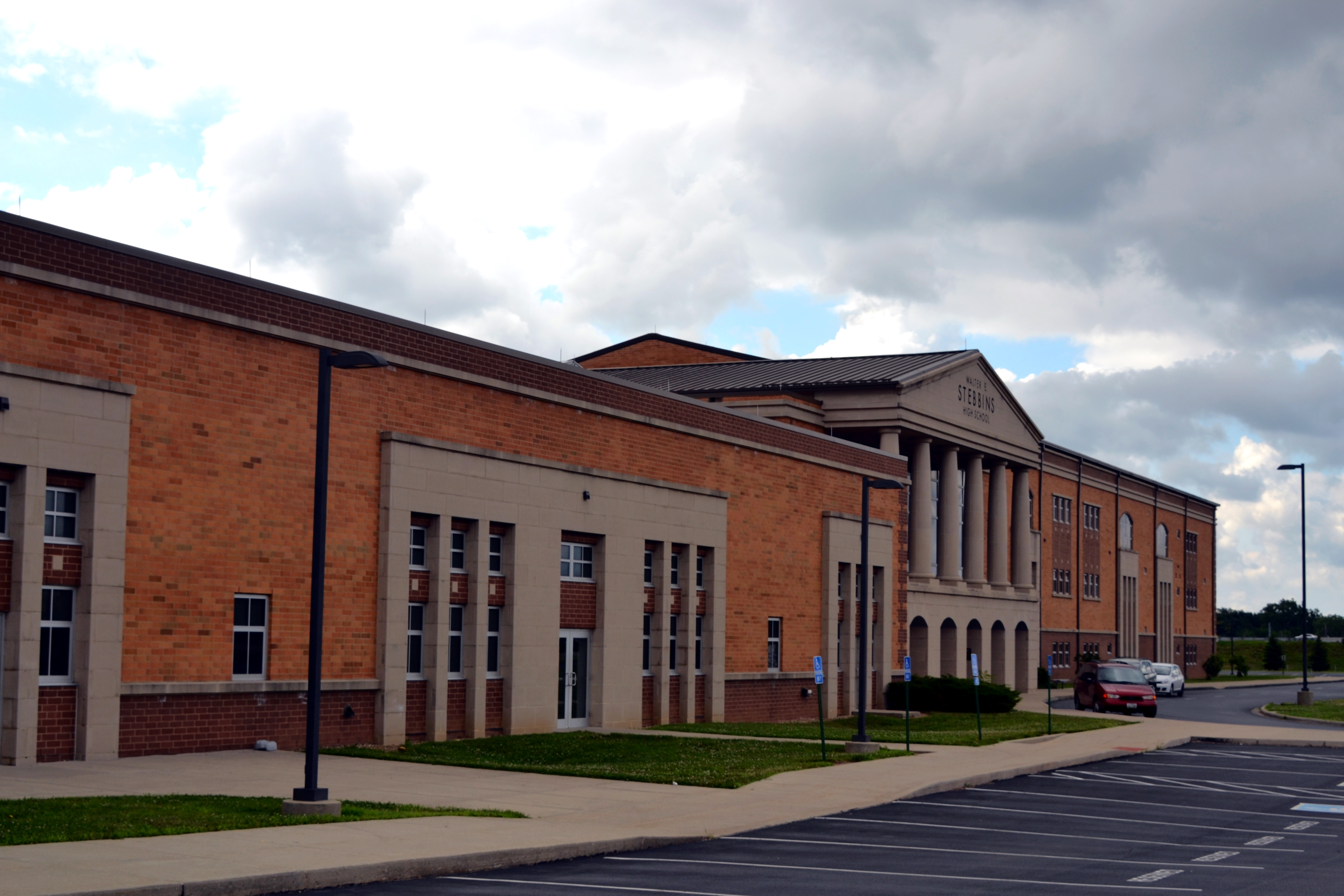
- Stebbins High School
- Motto: Pride. Progress. Possibilities.
- Interactive map of Riverside, Ohio
- Location within Ohio Location within the United States
- Coordinates: 39°46′44″N 84°07′35″W
- Country: United States
- State: Ohio
- County: Montgomery
- Incorporated: January 1, 1995

Government
  - Mayor: Pete Williams
  - City Manager: Joshua Rauch

Area
  - Total: 9.75 sq mi (25.24 km^{2})
  - Land: 9.73 sq mi (25.19 km^{2})
  - Water: 0.019 sq mi (0.05 km^{2})
- Elevation: 778 ft (237 m)

Population (2020)
  - Total: 24,474
  - Density: 2,516.5/sq mi (971.61/km^{2})
- Time zone: UTC-5 (Eastern (EST))
  - Summer (DST): UTC-4 (EDT)
- Postal codes: 45414, 45424
- Area code: 937
- FIPS code: 39-67468
- GNIS feature ID: 2399089
- Website: https://www.riversideoh.gov/

Riverside is a city in Montgomery County, Ohio, United States. The population was 24,474 at the 2020 census. A suburb of Dayton, it is part of the Dayton metropolitan area.

== Geography ==
According to the United States Census Bureau, the city has a total area of 9.76 square miles (25.28 km^{2}), of which 9.72 square miles (25.17 km^{2}) is land and 0.04 square miles (0.10 km^{2}) is water.

In 1994, Riverside merged with the surrounding Mad River Township. This merger resulted in the creation of several separated sections of the city in parts of the township that had experienced annexations by Dayton, Huber Heights, and Wright-Patterson Air Force Base. There are a total of six disconnected sections of the city. The southernmost section comprises four smaller sections that are attached solely by annexed roadways and not surrounding properties.

The city is adjacent to Dayton, Kettering, Huber Heights, Wright-Patterson and a small section of Harrison Township in Montgomery County. The city of Beavercreek, Bath Township and Beavercreek Township in Greene County border Riverside on the east.

== Demographics ==
Historical population
Census	Pop.	Note	%±
1930	224		—
1940	227		1.3%
1950	370		63.0%
1960	259		−30.0%
1970	1,576		508.5%
1980	1,475		−6.4%
1990	1,471		−0.3%
2000	23,545		1,500.6%
2010	25,201		7.0%
2020	24,474		−2.9%
2025 (est.)	24,706		0.9%

=== 2020 census ===
As of the 2020 census, Riverside had a population of 24,474. The median age was 35.5 years. 23.2% of residents were under the age of 18 and 15.5% of residents were 65 years of age or older. For every 100 females there were 96.9 males, and for every 100 females age 18 and over there were 94.7 males age 18 and over.

There were 10,310 households in Riverside, of which 28.8% had children under the age of 18 living in them. Of all households, 39.4% were married-couple households, 22.7% were households with a male householder and no spouse or partner present, and 29.2% were households with a female householder and no spouse or partner present. About 32.3% of all households were made up of individuals and 11.9% had someone living alone who was 65 years of age or older.

There were 11,427 housing units, of which 9.8% were vacant. The homeowner vacancy rate was 1.5% and the rental vacancy rate was 6.7%.

100.0% of residents lived in urban areas, while 0.0% lived in rural areas.

Racial composition as of the 2020 census
Race	Number	Percent
White	19,075	77.9%
Black or African American	2,072	8.5%
American Indian and Alaska Native	104	0.4%
Asian	714	2.9%
Native Hawaiian and Other Pacific Islander	11	0.0%
Some other race	493	2.0%
Two or more races	2,005	8.2%
Hispanic or Latino (of any race)	1,260	5.1%

=== 2010 census ===
As of the census of 2010, there were 25,201 people, 10,284 households, and 6,696 families living in the city. The population density was 2,592.7 inhabitants per square mile (1,001.0/km^{2}). There were 11,304 housing units at an average density of 1,163.0 per square mile (449.0/km^{2}). The racial makeup of the city was 87.2% White, 6.6% African American, 0.3% Native American, 1.9% Asian, 1.1% from other races, and 2.8% from two or more races. Hispanic or Latino of any race were 3.3% of the population.

There were 10,284 households, of which 33.5% had children under the age of 18 living with them, 44.2% were married couples living together, 15.0% had a female householder with no husband present, 5.9% had a male householder with no wife present, and 34.9% were non-families. 28.9% of all households were made up of individuals, and 10.6% had someone living alone who was 65 years of age or older. The average household size was 2.45 and the average family size was 3.01.

The median age in the city was 34.8 years. 24.7% of residents were under the age of 18; 10.9% were between the ages of 18 and 24; 26.8% were from 25 to 44; 23.8% were from 45 to 64; and 13.8% were 65 years of age or older. The gender makeup of the city was 48.5% male and 51.5% female.

=== 2000 census ===
As of the census of 2000, there were 23,545 people, 9,768 households, and 6,427 families living in the city. The population density was 2,996.6 inhabitants per square mile (1,157.0/km^{2}). There were 10,289 housing units at an average density of 1,309.5 per square mile (505.6/km^{2}). The racial makeup of the city was 91.45% White, 4.26% African American, 0.21% Native American, 1.76% Asian, 0.05% Pacific Islander, 0.61% from other races, and 1.66% from two or more races. Hispanic or Latino of any race were 1.55% of the population.

There were 9,768 households, out of which 28.3% had children under the age of 18 living with them, 49.3% were married couples living together, 12.2% had a female householder with no husband present, and 34.2% were non-families. 27.9% of all households were made up of individuals, and 10.1% had someone living alone who was 65 years of age or older. The average household size was 2.41 and the average family size was 2.95.

In the city, the population was spread out, with 23.5% under the age of 18, 10.3% from 18 to 24, 28.4% from 25 to 44, 23.0% from 45 to 64, and 14.9% who were 65 years of age or older. The median age was 37 years. For every 100 females, there were 94.5 males. For every 100 females age 18 and over, there were 91.6 males.

The median income for a household in the city was $37,034, and the median income for a family was $43,650. Males had a median income of $33,987 versus $23,525 for females. The per capita income for the city was $18,702. About 6.7% of families and 10.1% of the population were below the poverty line, including 12.4% of those under age 18 and 10.6% of those age 65 or over.

== Education ==
Riverside is served by the public Mad River Local School District, which includes four elementary schools, two middle schools and Stebbins High School.

== Notable people ==
- Charles Michael Davis, actor, best known for role on The CW television drama, The Originals
- Joe Greene, two time Olympic bronze medalist long jumper
