= List of school districts in Ohio =

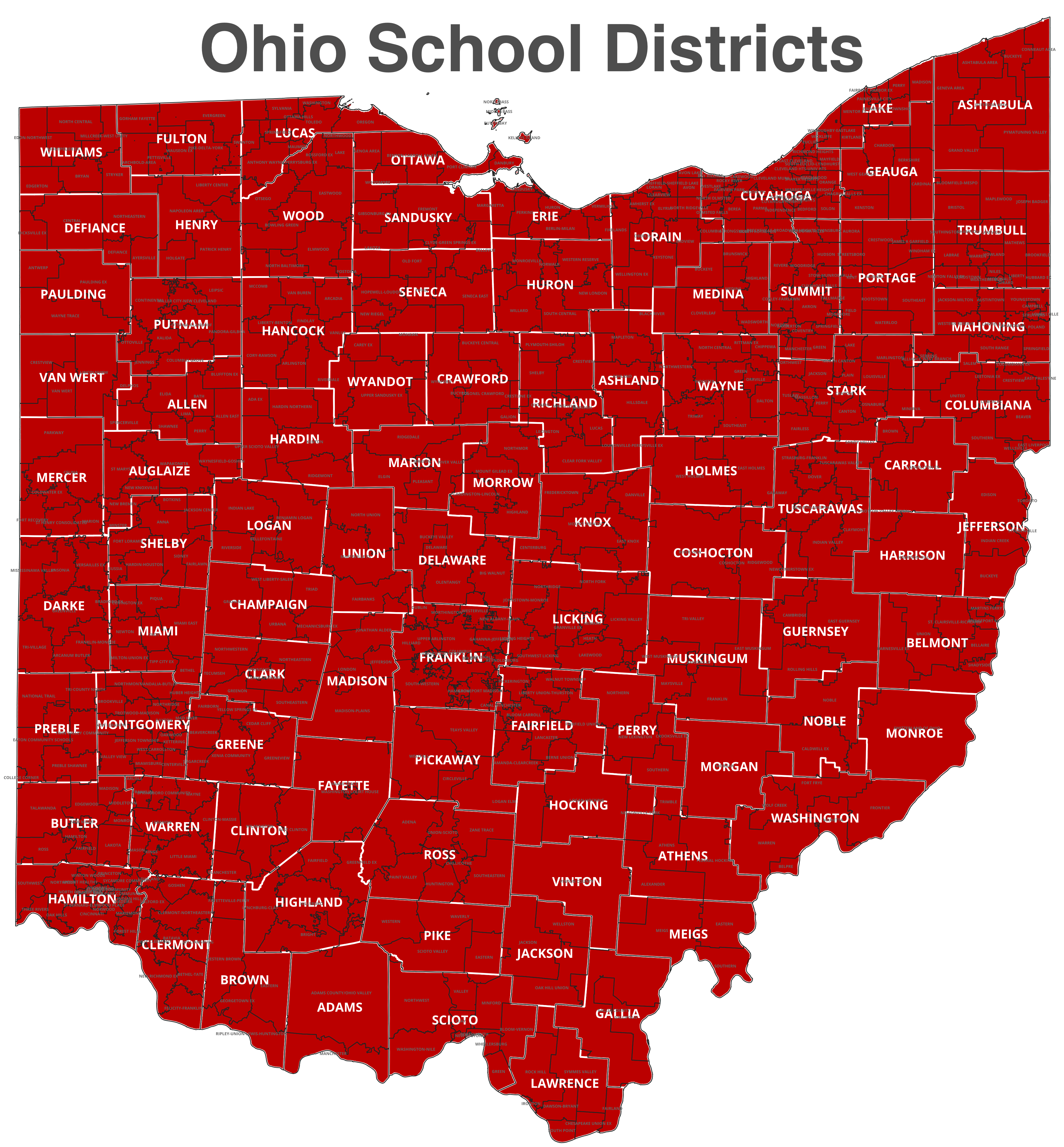
Ohio School Districts and County boundary lines

This is a list of school districts in the U.S. state of Ohio, sorted by the name of school district. Districts will often shorten their names; for example, Sandy Valley Local School District is often referred to as Sandy Valley Schools. Districts are listed by the name the district uses to refer to itself.

School districts in Ohio are classified as either city school districts, exempted village school districts, or local school districts. City and exempted village school districts are exempted from county boards of education, and local school districts remain under county school board supervision. In Ohio, community schools (charter schools) serve as their own independent school districts. School districts may combine resources to form a fourth type of school district, the joint vocational school district, which focuses on a technical based curriculum. There are currently 611 individual school districts in Ohio. In 1914, Ohio had 2,674 school districts.

The U.S. Census Bureau classifies Ohio school districts as independent governments. There are no Ohio K-12 public school systems dependent on another layer of government.

In southwestern Ohio, portions of Preble and Butler counties near College Corner are served by the Union County–College Corner Joint School District of Union County, Indiana. The State of Ohio reimburses the state of Indiana for the cost of educating Ohio students.

== A ==
- Ada Exempted Village School District, Ada
- Adams County Ohio Valley School District, West Union
- Adena Local School District, Frankfort
- Akron Public School District, Akron
- Alexander Local School District, Albany
- Allen East Local School District, Lafayette
- Alliance City School District, Alliance
- Amanda-Clearcreek Local School District, Amanda
- Amherst Exempted Village School District, Amherst
- Anna Local School District, Anna
- Ansonia Local School District, Ansonia
- Anthony Wayne Local School District, Whitehouse
- Antwerp Local School District, Antwerp
- Apollo Career Center, Lima
- Arcadia Local Schools, Arcadia
- Arcanum-Butler Local School District, Arcanum
- Archbold Area Local School District, Archbold
- Arlington Local Schools, Arlington
- Ashland City School District, Ashland
- Ashtabula Area City School District, Ashtabula
- Ashtabula County Technical & Career Campus, Jefferson
- Athens City School District, Athens
- Auburn Career Center, Painesville
- Aurora City School District, Aurora
- Austintown Local School District, Youngstown
- Avon Lake City School District, Avon Lake
- Avon Local School District, Avon
- Ayersville Local School District, Defiance

== B ==
- Barberton City School District, Barberton
- Barnesville Exempted Village School District, Barnesville
- Batavia Local School District, Batavia
- Bath Local School District, Lima
- Bay Village City School District, Bay Village
- Beachwood City School District, Beachwood
- Beaver Local School District, East Liverpool
- Beavercreek City School District, Beavercreek
- Bedford City School District, Bedford
- Bellaire Local School District, Bellaire
- Bellbrook-Sugarcreek Local School District, Bellbrook
- Bellefontaine City School District, Bellefontaine
- Bellevue City School District, Bellevue
- Belmont-Harrison Career Centers, St. Clairsville
- Belpre City School District, Belpre
- Benjamin Logan Local School District, Bellefontaine
- Benton-Carroll-Salem Local School District, Oak Harbor
- Berea City School District, Berea
- Berkshire Local School District, Burton
- Berne Union Local School District, Sugar Grove
- Bethel Local School District, Tipp City
- Bethel-Tate Local School District, Bethel
- Bexley City School District, Bexley
- Big Walnut Local School District, Sunbury
- Black River Local School District, Sullivan
- Blanchester Local Schools, Blanchester
- Bloom-Carroll Local School District, Carroll
- Bloomfield-Mespo School District, North Bloomfield
- Bloom-Vernon Local School District, South Webster
- Bluffton Exempted Village School District, Bluftton
- Boardman Local School District, Youngstown
- Botkins Local School District, Botkins
- Bowling Green City School District, Bowling Green
- Bradford Exempted Village School District, Bradford
- Brecksville-Broadview Heights City School District, Brecksville, Broadview Heights
- Bridgeport Exempted Village School District, Bridgeport
- Bright Local School District, Mowrystown
- Bristol Local School District, West Farmington
- Brookfield Local School District, Brookfield
- Brooklyn City School District, Brooklyn
- Brookville Local School District, Brookville
- Brown Local School District, Malvern
- Brunswick City School District, Brunswick
- Bryan City School District, Bryan
- Buckeye Career Center, New Philadelphia
- Buckeye Central Local School District, New Washington
- Buckeye Local School District, Ashtabula
- Buckeye Local School District, Dillonvale
- Buckeye Local School District, Medina
- Buckeye Valley Local School District, Delaware
- Bucyrus City School District, Bucyrus
- Butler Tech, Hamilton

== C ==
- Caldwell Exempted Village School District, Caldwell
- Cambridge City School District, Cambridge
- Campbell City School District, Campbell
- Canal Winchester Local School District, Canal Winchester
- Canfield Local School District, Canfield
- Canton City School District, Canton
- Canton Local School District, Canton
- Cardinal Local School District, Middlefield
- Cardington Lincoln Local Digital School, Cardington
- Cardington-Lincoln Local School District, Cardington
- Carey Exempted Village School District, Carey
- Carlisle Local School District, Carlisle
- Carrollton Exempted Village School District, Carrollton
- Cedar Cliff Local School District, Cedarville
- Celina City School District, Celina
- Center for Student Achievement, Jackson
- Centerburg Local School District, Centerburg
- Centerville City School District, Centerville
- Central Local School District, Sherwood
- Chagrin Falls Village Exempted School District, Chagrin Falls
- Champion Local School District, Warren
- Chardon Local School District, Chardon
- Chesapeake-Union Exempted Village School District, Chesapeake
- Chillicothe City School District, Chillicothe
- Chippewa Local School District, Doylestown
- Cincinnati Public Schools, Cincinnati
- Circleville City School District, Circleville
- Clark-Shawnee Local School District, Springfield
- Clay Local School District, Rosemount
- Claymont Local School District, Dennison
- Clear Fork Valley Local School District, Bellville, Butler
- Clearview Local School District, Lorain
- Clermont Northeastern Local School District, Batavia
- Cleveland Heights-University Heights City School District, Cleveland Heights, University Heights
- Cleveland Metropolitan School District, Cleveland
- Clinton-Massie Local School District, Clarksville
- Cloverleaf Local School District, Seville
- Clyde-Green Springs Exempted Village School District, Clyde
- Coldwater Exempted Village School District, Coldwater
- Collins Career Center (Joint Vocational Academy College, JVAC), Proctorville
- Colonel Crawford Local School District, North Robinson
- Columbia Local School District, Columbia Station
- Columbiana County Joint Vocational School District, Lisbon
- Columbiana Exempted Village School District, Columbiana
- Columbus City Schools, Columbus
- Columbus Grove Local School District, Columbus Grove
- Conneaut Area City School District, Conneaut
- Conotton Valley Union Local School District, Bowerston
- Continental Local School District, Continental
- Copley-Fairlawn Local School District, Fairlawn
- Cory-Rawson Local Schools, Rawson
- Coshocton City Schools District, Coshocton
- Coventry Local School District, Akron
- Covington Exempted Village School District, Covington
- Crestline Exempted Village School District, Crestline
- Crestview Local School District, Columbiana
- Crestview Local School District, Ashland
- Crestview Local School District, Convoy
- Crestwood Local School District, Mantua
- Crooksville Exempted Village Schools, Crooksville
- Cuyahoga Falls City School District, Cuyahoga Falls
- Cuyahoga Heights School District, Cuyahoga Heights

== D ==
- Dalton Local School District, Dalton
- Danbury Local School District, Marblehead
- Danville Local School District, Danville
- Dawson-Bryant Local School District, Coal Grove
- Dayton Public School District, Dayton
- Deer Park Community City School District, Deer Park
- Defiance City School District, Defiance
- Delaware City Local School District, Delaware
- Delphos City School District, Delphos
- Dover City School District, Dover
- Dublin City School District, Dublin

== E ==
- East Cleveland City School District, East Cleveland
- East Clinton Local School District, Sabina
- East Guernsey Local School District, Lore City
- East Holmes Local School District, Berlin
- East Knox Local School District, Howard
- East Liverpool City School District, East Liverpool
- East Muskingum Local School District, New Concord
- East Palestine City School District, East Palestine
- Eastern Local School District, Sardinia
- Eastern Local School District, Reedsville
- Eastern Local School District, Beaver
- Eastwood Local School District, Pemberville
- Eaton City School District, Eaton
- Edgerton Local School District, Edgerton
- Edgewood Local School District, Trenton
- Edison Local School District, Richmond
- Edon-Northwest Local School District, Edon
- Elgin Local School District, Marion
- Elida Digital Academy, Elida
- Elida Local School District, Elida
- Elmwood Local School District, Bloomdale
- Elyria City School District, Elyria
- Euclid City School District, Euclid
- Evergreen Local School District, Metamora

== F ==
- Fairbanks Local School District, Milford Center
- Fairborn City School District, Fairborn
- Fairfield City School District, Fairfield
- Fairfield Local School District, Leesburg
- Fairfield Union Local School District, West Rushville
- Fairland Local School District, Proctorville
- Fairlawn Local School District, Sidney
- Fairless Local School District, Navarre
- Fairport Harbor Exempted Village School District, Fairport Harbor
- Fairview Park City School District, Fairview Park
- Fayetteville-Perry Local School District, Fayetteville
- Federal Hocking Local School District, Coolville
- Felicity-Franklin Local School District, Felicity
- Field Local School District, Mogadore
- Findlay City School District, Findlay
- Finneytown Local School District, Finneytown
- Firelands Local School District, Oberlin
- Forest Hills Local School District, Newtown/Anderson Township
- Fort Frye Local School District, Beverly
- Fort Jennings Local School District, Fort Jennings
- Fort Loramie Local School District, Fort Loramie
- Fort Recovery Local School District, Fort Recovery
- Fostoria City School District, Fostoria
- Franklin City School District, Franklin
- Franklin Local School District, Duncan Falls
- Franklin-Monroe Local School District, Pitsburg
- Fredericktown Local School District, Fredericktown
- Fremont City School District, Fremont
- Frontier Local School District, New Matamoras

== G ==
- Gahanna-Jefferson City School District, Gahanna
- Galion City School District, Galion
- Gallia County Local School District, Gallipolis
- Gallipolis City School District, Gallipolis
- Garaway Local School District, Sugarcreek
- Garfield Heights City School District, Garfield Heights
- Geneva Area City School District, Geneva
- Genoa Area Local School District, Genoa
- Georgetown Exempted Village School District, Georgetown
- Gibsonburg Exempted Village School District, Gibsonburg
- Girard City School District, Girard
- Gorham Fayette Local School District, Fayette
- Goshen Local School District, Goshen
- Graham Local School District, Saint Paris
- Grand Valley Local School District, Orwell
- Grandview Heights City School District, Grandview Heights
- Granville Exempted Village School District, Granville
- Great Oaks Career Campuses, Sharonville
- Green Local School District, Franklin Furnace
- Green Local School District, Green
- Green Local Schools (Wayne County), Smithville
- Greeneview Local School District, Jamestown
- Greenfield Exempted Village School District, Greenfield
- Greenon Local School District, Enon
- Greenville City School District, Greenville
- Groveport-Madison Local School District, Groveport

== H ==
- Hamilton City School District, Hamilton
- Hamilton Local School District, Columbus
- Hardin Northern Local School District, Dola
- Hardin-Houston Local School District, Houston
- Harrison Hills City School District, Hopedale
- Heath City School District, Heath
- Heir Force Community School, Lima
- Hicksville Exempted Village School District, Hicksville
- Highland Local School District, Medina
- Highland Local School District, Sparta
- Hilliard City School District, Hilliard
- Hillsboro City School District, Hillsboro
- Hillsdale Local School District, Jeromesville
- Holgate Local School District, Holgate
- Hope Haven & JVAC District, Scioto County
- Hopewell-Loudon Local School District, Bascom
- Howland Local School District, Warren
- Hubbard Exempted Village School District, Hubbard
- Huber Heights City School District, Huber Heights
- Hudson City School District, Hudson
- Huntington Local School District, Chillicothe
- Huron City School District, Huron

== I ==
- Independence City School District, Independence
- Indian Creek Local School District, Wintersville
- Indian Hill Exempted Village School District, Village of Indian Hill
- Indian Lake Local School District, Lewistown
- Indian Valley Local School District, Gnadenhutten
- Ironton City School District, Ironton

== J ==
- Jackson Center Local School District, Jackson Center
- Jackson City School District, Jackson
- Jackson Local School District, Massillon
- Jackson-Milton Local School District, North Jackson
- James A. Garfield Local School District, Garrettsville
- Jefferson Area Local School District, Jefferson
- Jefferson Local School District, West Jefferson
- Jefferson Township Local School District, Dayton
- Johnstown-Monroe Local School District, Johnstown
- Jonathan Alder Local School District, Plain City

== K ==
- Kalida Local School District, Kalida
- Kelleys Island Local School District, Kelleys Island
- Kenston Local School District, Chagrin Falls
- Kent City School District, Kent
- Kenton City School District, Kenton
- Kettering City School District, Kettering
- Keystone Local School District, Lagrange
- Kings Local School District, Kings Mills
- Kirtland Local School District, Kirtland

== L ==
- Lake Local School District, Uniontown
- Lake Local School District, Millbury
- Lakeview Local School District, Cortland
- Lakewood City School District, Lakewood
- Lakewood Local Schools, Hebron
- Lakota Local School District, West Chester
- Lakota Local School District, Kansas
- Lancaster City School District, Lancaster
- Lebanon City School District, Lebanon
- Leetonia Exempted Village School District, Leetonia
- Leipsic Local School District, Leipsic
- Lexington Local School District, Lexington
- Liberty Center Local School District, Liberty Center
- Liberty Local School District, Girard
- Liberty Union Local School District, Baltimore
- Liberty-Benton Local School District, Findlay
- Licking Heights Local School District, Pataskala
- Licking Valley Local School District, Hanover
- Lima City School District, Lima
- Lincolnview Local School District, Van Wert
- Lisbon Exempted Village School District, Lisbon
- Little Miami Local School District, Morrow
- Lockland City School District, Lockland
- Logan Elm Local School District, Circleville
- Logan-Hocking Local School District, Logan
- London City School District, London
- Lorain City School District, Lorain
- Loudonville-Perrysville Exempted Village School District, Loudonville
- Louisville City School District, Louisville
- Loveland City School District, Loveland
- Lowellville Local School District, Lowellville
- Lucas Local School District, Lucas
- Lynchburg-Clay Local School District, Lynchburg

== M ==
- Mad River Local School District, Riverside
- Madeira City School District, Madeira
- Madison Local School District, Madison
- Madison Local School District, Mansfield
- Madison Local School District, Middletown
- Madison-Plains Local School District, London
- Manchester Local School District, Manchester
- Manchester Local School District, Akron
- Mansfield City School District, Mansfield
- Maple Heights City School District, Maple Heights
- Mapleton Local School District, Ashland
- Maplewood Local School District, Cortland
- Margaretta Local School District, Castalia
- Mariemont City School District, Mariemont
- Marietta City School District, Marietta
- Marion City School District, Marion
- Marion Local School District, Maria Stein
- Marlington Local School District, Alliance
- Martins Ferry City School District, Martins Ferry
- Marysville Exempted Village Schools District, Marysville
- Mason City School District, Mason
- Massillon City School District, Massillon
- Maumee City School District, Maumee
- Mayfield City School District, Mayfield Heights, Highland Heights, Mayfield Village, Gates Mills
- Maysville Local School District, Zanesville
- McComb Local School District, McComb
- Mechanicsburg Exempted Village School District, Mechanicsburg
- Medina City School District, Medina
- Meigs Local School District, Pomeroy
- Mentor Exempted Village School District, Mentor
- Miami East Local School District, Casstown
- Miami Trace Local School District, Washington Court House
- Miamisburg City School District, Miamisburg
- Middle Bass Local School District, Middle Bass
- Middletown City School District, Middletown
- Middletown Fitness & Preparatory Academy, Middletown
- Midview Local School District, Grafton
- Milford Exempted Village School District, Milford
- Millcreek-West Unity Local School District, West Unity
- Miller City-New Cleveland Local School District, Miller City
- Milton-Union Exempted Village School District, West Milton
- Minerva Local School District, Minerva
- Minford Local School District, Minford
- Minster Local School District, Minster
- Mississinawa Valley Local School District, Union City
- Mogadore Local School District, Mogadore
- Mohawk Local School District, Sycamore
- Monroe Local School District, Monroe
- Monroeville Local School District, Monroeville
- Montpelier Exempted Village School District, Montpelier
- Morgan Local School District, McConnelsville
- Mount Gilead Exempted Village School District, Mount Gilead
- Mount Vernon City School District, Mount Vernon
- Mt Healthy City Schools, Mount Healthy

== N ==
- Napoleon City School District, Napoleon
- National Trail Local School District, New Paris
- Nelsonville-York City School District, Nelsonville
- New Albany-Plain Local School District, New Albany
- New Boston Local School District, New Boston
- New Bremen Local School District, New Bremen
- New Knoxville Local School District, New Knoxville
- New Lebanon Local School District, New Lebanon
- New Lexington City School District, New Lexington
- New London Local School District, New London
- New Miami Local School District, Hamilton
- New Philadelphia City School District, New Philadelphia
- New Richmond Exempted Village School District, New Richmond
- New Riegel Local School District, New Riegel
- Newark City School District, Newark
- Newcomerstown Exempted Village School District, Newcomerstown
- Newton Falls City School District, Newton Falls
- Newton Local School District, Pleasant Hill
- Niles City School District, Niles
- Noble Local School District, Sarahsville
- Nordonia Hills City School District, Northfield
- North Baltimore Local School District, North Baltimore
- North Bass Local School District, North Bass
- North Canton City School District, North Canton
- North Central Local School District, Creston
- North Central Local School District, Pioneer
- North College Hill City School District, North College Hill
- North Fork Local School District, Utica
- North Olmsted City School District, North Olmsted
- North Ridgeville City School District, North Ridgeville
- North Royalton City School District, North Royalton, Broadview Heights
- North Union Local School District, Richwood
- Northeastern Local School District (Springfield), Springfield
- Northeastern Local School District, Defiance
- Northern Local School District, Thornville
- Northmont City School District, Clayton
- Northmor Local School District, Galion
- Northridge Local School District (Johnstown, Ohio), Johnstown
- Northridge Local School District, Dayton
- Northwest Local School District, Colerain
- Northwest Local School District, McDermott
- Northwest Local School District, Canal Fulton
- Northwestern Local School District, Springfield
- Northwestern Local School District, West Salem
- Northwood Local School District, Northwood
- Norton City School District, Norton
- Norwalk City School District, Norwalk
- Norwayne Local School District, Crestion
- Norwood City School District, Norwood

== O ==
- Oak Hill Union Local School District, Oak Hill
- Oak Hills Local School District, Delhi Township/Green Township
- Oakwood City School District, Oakwood
- Oberlin City School District, Oberlin
- Old Fort Local School District, Old Fort
- Olentangy Local School District, Lewis Center
- Olmsted Falls City School District, Olmsted Falls, Olmsted Township
- Ontario Local School District, Ontario
- Orange City School District, Pepper Pike, Orange, Moreland Hills, Hunting Valley, and Woodmere
- Oregon City School District, Oregon
- Orrville City School District, Orrville
- Osnaburg Local School District, East Canton
- Otsego Local School District, Tontogany
- Ottawa Hills Local School District, Ottawa Hills
- Ottawa-Glandorf Local School District, Ottawa
- Ottoville Local School District, Ottoville

== P ==
- Painesville City Local School District, Painesville
- Paint Valley Local School District, Bainbridge
- Pandora-Gilboa Local School District, Pandora
- Parkway Local School District, Rockford
- Parma City School District, Parma
- Patrick Henry Local School District, Hamler
- Paulding Exempted Village Schools, Paulding
- Perkins Local School District, Sandusky
- Perry Local School District, Lima
- Perry Local School District, Perry
- Perry Local School District, Massillon
- Perrysburg Exempted Village School District, Perrysburg
- Pettisville Local School District, Pettisville
- Pickerington Local School District, Pickerington
- Pike-Delta-York Local School District, Delta
- Piqua City School District, Piqua
- Plain Local School District, Canton
- Pleasant Local School District, Marion
- Plymouth-Shiloh Local School District, Plymouth, Shiloh
- Poland Local School District, Poland
- Port Clinton City School District, Port Clinton
- Portsmouth City School District, Portsmouth
- Preble Shawnee Local School District, Camden
- Princeton City School District, Sharonville
- Put-in-Bay Local School District, Put-in-Bay
- Pymatuning Valley School District, Andover

== R ==
- Ravenna School District, Ravenna
- Reading Community City School District, Reading
- Revere Local School District, Bath
- Reynoldsburg City School District, Reynoldsburg
- Richard Allen Schools, Hamilton
- Richmond Heights City School District, Richmond Heights
- Ridgedale Local School District, Morral
- Ridgemont Local School District, Ridgeway
- Ridgewood local School District, West Lafayette
- Ripley Union Lewis Huntington Local School District, Ripley
- Rittman Exempted Village School District, Rittman
- River Valley Local School District, Caledonia
- River View Local School District, Warsaw
- Riverdale Local Schools, Mount Blanchard
- Riverside Local School District, DeGraff
- Riverside Local School District, Painesville
- Rock Hill Local School District, Pedro
- Rocky River City School District, Rocky River
- Rolling Hills Local School District, Byesville
- Rootstown Local School District, Rootstown
- Ross Local School District, Hamilton
- Rossford Exempted Village School District, Rossford
- Russia Local School District, Russia

== S ==
- Saint Bernard-Elmwood Place City School District, Saint Bernard
- Saint Henry Consolidated Local School District, Saint Henry
- Saint Joseph Private Schools, Ironton
- Saint Marys City School District, Saint Marys
- Salem City School District, Salem
- Sandusky City School District, Sandusky
- Sandy Valley Local School District, East Sparta
- Scioto Valley Local School District, Piketon
- Sciotoville School District, Portsmouth
- Sebring Local School District, Sebring
- Seneca East Local School District, Attica
- Shadyside Local School District, Shadyside
- Shaker Heights City School District, Shaker Heights
- Shawnee Local School District, Fort Shanwee
- Sheffield-Sheffield Lake City Schools, Sheffield
- Shelby City School District, Shelby
- Sidney City School District, Sidney
- Solon City School District, Solon
- South Central Local School District, Greenwich
- South Euclid-Lyndhurst City School District, South Euclid, Lyndhurst
- South Point Local School District, South Point
- South Range Local School District, Canfield
- Southeast Local School District, Apple Creek
- Southeast Local School District, Ravenna
- Southeastern Local School District, Richmond Dale
- Southeastern Local School District, South Charleston
- Southern Hills Joint Vocational School District, Georgetown
- Southern Local School District, Salineville
- Southern Local School District, Racine
- Southern Local School District, Corning
- Southwest Licking Local School District, Pataskala
- Southwest Local School District, Harrison
- South-Western City School District (Franklin County, Ohio), Grove City
- Spencerville Local School District, Spencerville
- Springboro Community City School District, Springboro
- Springfield City School District, Springfield
- Springfield Local School District, Holland
- Springfield Local School District, New Middletown
- Springfield Local School District, Akron
- Springfield-Clark County Joint Vocational School District, Springfield
- St. Clairsville-Richland City School District, St. Clairsville
- Steubenville City School District, Steubenville
- Stow-Munroe Falls City School District, Stow
- Strasburg-Franklin Local School District, Strasburg
- Streetsboro City School District, Streetsboro
- Strongsville City School District, Strongsville
- Struthers City School District, Struthers
- Stryker Local School District, Stryker
- Swanton Local School District, Swanton
- Switzerland of Ohio Local School District, Woodsfield
- Sycamore Community School District, Blue Ash
- Sylvania City School District, Sylvania
- Symmes Valley Local School District, Willow Wood, Waterloo

== T ==
- Talawanda City School District, Oxford
- Tallmadge City School District, Tallmadge
- Teays Valley Local School District, Ashville,
- Tecumseh Local School District, New Carlisle
- Three Rivers Local School District, Cleves
- Tiffin City School District, Tiffin
- Tipp City Exempted Village School District, Tipp City
- Toledo City School District, Toledo
- Toronto City School District, Toronto
- Triad Local School District, North Lewisburg
- Tri-County Joint Vocational School District, Nelsonville
- Tri-County North Local School District, Lewisburg
- Trimble Local School District, Glouster
- Tri-Valley Local School District, Dresden
- Tri-Village Local School District, New Madison
- Triway Local School District, Wooster
- Trotwood-Madison City School District, Trotwood
- Troy City Schools, Troy
- Tuscarawas Catholic Central School District, New Philadelphia, Ohio
- Tuscarawas Valley Local School District, Zoarville
- Tuslaw Local School District, Massillon
- Twin Valley Community Local School District, West Alexandria
- Twinsburg City School District, Twinsburg

== U ==
- Ulysses Simpson Grant Joint Vocational School District, Bethel
- Union County College Corner Joint School District, College Corner, Indiana
- Union Local School District, Morristown
- Union-Scioto Local School District, Chillicothe
- United Local School District, Hanoverton
- Upper Arlington City School District, Upper Arlington
- Upper Sandusky Exempted Village School District, Upper Sandusky
- Upper Scioto Valley Local School District, McGuffey
- Urbana City School District, Urbana

== V ==
- Valley Local School District, Lucasville
- Valley View Local School District, Germantown
- Van Buren Local School District, Van Buren
- Van Wert City School District, Van Wert
- Vandalia-Butler City School District, Vandalia
- Vanlue Local School District, Vanlue
- Vermilion Local School District, Vermilion
- Versailles Exempted Village School District, Versailles
- Vinton County Local School District, McArthur

== W ==
- Wadsworth City School District, Wadsworth
- Walnut Township Local School District, Millersport
- Wapakoneta City School District, Wapakoneta
- Warren City School District, Warren
- Warren Local School District, Vincent
- Warrensville Heights City School District, Warrensville Heights
- Washington Court House City School District, Washington Court House
- Washington Local School District, Toledo
- Washington-Nile Local School District, West Portsmouth
- Waterloo Local School District, Waterloo
- Wauseon Exempted Village School District, Wauseon
- Waverly City School District, Waverly
- Wayne Trace Local School District, Haviland
- Waynesfield-Goshen Local School District, Waynesfield
- Waynesville Local School District, Waynesville
- Weathersfield Local School District, Mineral Ridge
- Wellington Exempted Village School District, Wellington
- Wellston City School District, Wellston
- Wellsville Local School District, Wellsville
- West Branch Local School District, Beloit
- West Carrollton City School District, West Carrollton
- West Clermont Local School District, Cincinnati
- West Geauga County Local School District, Chester
- West Holmes Local School District, Millersburg
- West Liberty-Salem Local School District, West Liberty
- West Muskingum Local School District, Zanesville
- Western Brown Local School District, Mount Orab
- Western Local School District, Latham
- Western Reserve Local School District, Berlin Center
- Western Reserve Local School District, Collins
- Westerville City School District, Westerville
- Westfall Local School District, Williamsport
- Westlake City School District, Westlake
- Wheelersburg Local School District, Wheelersburg
- Whitehall City School District, Whitehall
- Wickliffe City School District, Wickliffe
- Willard City School District, Willard
- Williamsburg Local School District, Williamsburg
- Willoughby-Eastlake City School District, Eastlake
- Wilmington City School District, Wilmington
- Windham Exempted Village School District, Windham
- Winton Woods City School District, Forest Park
- Wolf Creek Local School District, Waterford
- Woodmore Local School District, Woodville
- Woodridge Local School District, Peninsula
- Wooster City School District, Wooster
- World Changer Leadership Academy, Lima
- Worthington City School District, Worthington
- Wynford Local School District, Bucyrus
- Wyoming City School District, Wyoming

== X ==
- Xenia Community City School District, Xenia

== Y ==
- Yellow Springs Exempted Village School District, Yellow Springs
- Youngstown City School District, Youngstown

== Z ==
- Zane Trace Local School District, Chillicothe
- Zanesville City School District, Zanesville
