= Riverdale High School (Ohio) =

Location
- 20613 State Route 37; Mount Blanchard, Ohio 45867; United States; 40°51′59″N 83°31′5″W

Information
- Type: Public
- Motto: Every Child, Every Day, Whatever It Takes...
- Established: 1962
- School district: Riverdale Local School District
- NCES School ID: 3904751029092
- Principal: Daniel Evans
- Teaching staff: 15.00 (FTE)
- Grades: 9–12
- Enrollment: 321 (2024–25)
- Student to teacher ratio: 21.40
- Campus type: Rural
- Colors: "Falcon" blue and white
- Athletics conference: Blanchard Valley Conference
- Team name: Falcons
- Rival: Liberty-Benton High School (modern), Arlington High School (traditional)
- Accreditation: Ohio Department of Education
- Website: www.riverdalefalcons.org

Riverdale High School is a public high school located in Delaware Township near Mount Blanchard, Ohio, United States. The school was established along with the district in 1962 as the result of a consolidation of three school districts: Forest (in Hardin County), Wharton (in Wyandot County) and Mount Blanchard (in Hancock County). It is the only high school in the Riverdale Local School District and is housed in the Riverdale K–12 building, which opened in 2004. The original high school building still stands on campus to act as a centralized office for records, a head start program as well as other school functions.

== History ==
Riverdale High School was established in 1962 with the consolidation of high school students from Forest, Mount Blanchard, and Wharton. The Riverdale Local School District had formed on January 1, 1960, but the three existing K–12 schools remained as they had been for the remainder of that school year and the subsequent 1960–61 and 1961–62 school years until the new high school was built. Voters approved funding for a new high school building in November 1960, to be built on rural land in between the three towns. With the opening of Riverdale High School, the existing schools became K–8 buildings until 1974, when seventh and eighth graders were sent to the Wharton building, which was renamed Riverdale Junior High School.

Prior to the consolidation, the three original schools had their own mascots (Forest Rangers, Mt. Blanchard Hurricanes, Wharton Dragons), fight songs, and alma maters. To eliminate arguments as to which of these to keep for the newly established high school, then music teacher Russell E. Willeke was asked to pen new, contemporary songs. His original composition and lyrics remain the student body's official fight song to this day.

Riverdale High School moved to its current home in January 2004 when the new Riverdale K–12 building was completed on the high school campus. The 1962 high school building was retained for other uses, such as board offices, Head Start, and other district programming.

== Athletics ==
Riverdale's athletic teams are known as the Falcons. School colors are Riverdale's own shade of royal blue (commonly referred to as "Falcon blue") and white with trims of silver used to accent uniforms and logos. The Riverdale student body considers their sports rival to by Liberty-Benton High School, although their traditional rival is Arlington High School, located just 15 minutes away. The Riverdale campus includes a stadium for football and soccer with an all-weather track, a baseball field, softball field, and practice fields for football and soccer, that are also used by the marching band.

Riverdale was previously a co-founding member of the North Central Conference (NCC) from 1962 until joining the Blanchard Valley Conference (BVC) in 2014. Riverdale was originally part of a group of ten schools that were going to form the Northern 10 Athletic Conference (N10) in 2014–15, ultimately causing the dissolution of the North Central Conference. However, in April 2013, Riverdale was invited to join the BVC, which is primarily made up of other schools located in Hancock County, and accepted the invitation.
