= Buckeye Local School District =

Buckeye Local School District may refer to:

- Buckeye Local School District (Ashtabula County), Ashtabula County, Ohio
- Buckeye Central Local School District, Crawford County, Ohio
- Buckeye Valley Local School District, Delaware County, Ohio
- Buckeye Local School District (Jefferson County), Jefferson County, Ohio
- Buckeye Local School District (Medina County), Medina County, Ohio
