= Riverdale Elementary School =

Riverdale Elementary School may refer to:

In Canada:

- Riverdale Elementary School (British Columbia) — Surrey, British Columbia

In the United States:

- Riverdale Elementary School (Anaheim, California) — Anaheim, California
- Riverdale Elementary School (Garden Grove, California) — Garden Grove, California
- Riverdale Elementary School (Colorado) — Thornton, Colorado
- Riverdale Elementary School (Florida) — Orlando, Florida
- Riverdale Elementary School (Georgia) — Riverdale, Georgia
- Riverdale Elementary School (Port Byron, Illinois) — Port Byron, Illinois
- Riverdale Elementary School (Rock Falls, Illinois) — Rock Falls, Illinois
- Riverdale Elementary School (Indiana) — Saint Joe, Indiana
- Riverdale Elementary School (Maryland) — Riverdale, Maryland
- Riverdale Elementary School (Massachusetts) — Dedham, Massachusetts
- Riverdale Public School (Nebraska) — Riverdale, Nebraska
- Riverdale Public School (New Jersey) — Riverdale, New Jersey
- Riverdale Elementary School (Forest, Ohio) — Forest, Ohio
- Riverdale Elementary School (Mount Blanchard, Ohio) — Mount Blanchard, Ohio
- Riverdale Elementary School (Oregon) — Portland, Oregon
- Riverdale Elementary School (Tennessee) — Germantown, Tennessee
- Riverdale Elementary School (Utah) — Ogden, Utah
- Riverdale Elementary School (Wisconsin) — Muscoda, Wisconsin
- Riverdale Heights Elementary School — Bettendorf, Iowa
