= Southeast Local School District =

School district in Ohio, United States

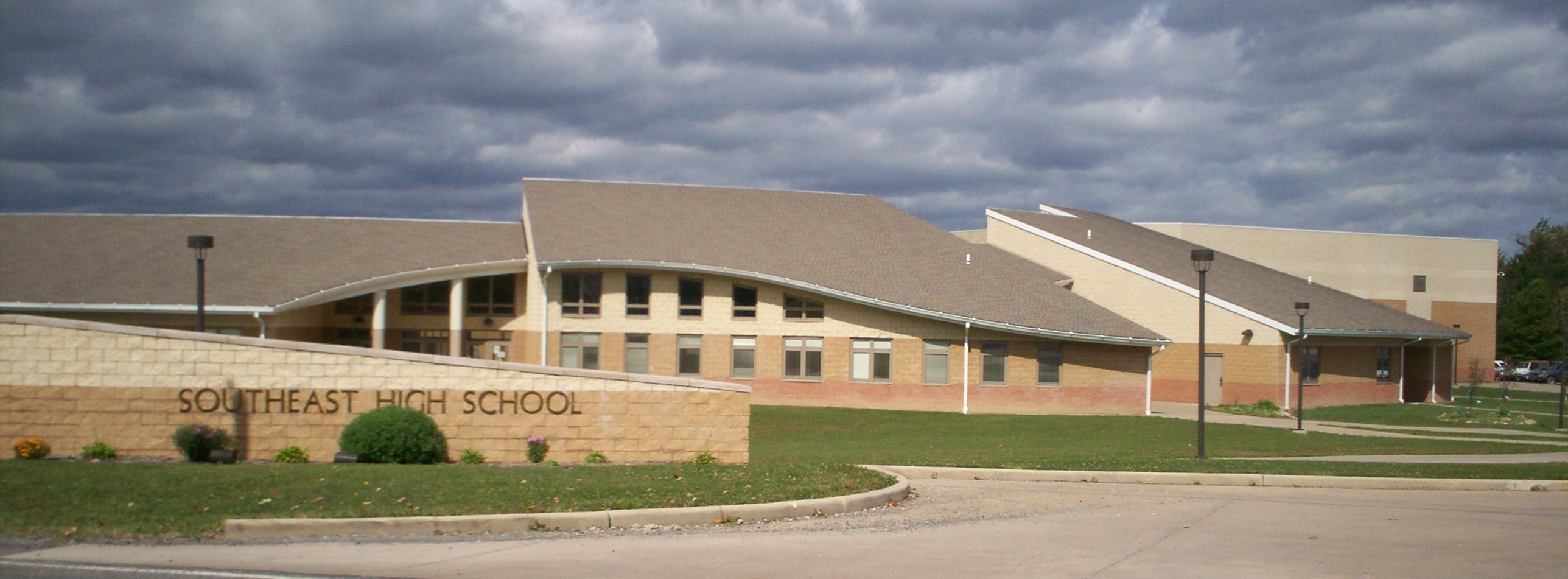
- Southeast High School

Address
- 8245 Tallmadge Road Ravenna, Ohio, 44266; United States
- Coordinates: 41°05′58″N 81°05′39″W

District information
- Type: Public
- Grades: K–12
- Established: 1950
- Superintendent: Robert Dunn
- Accreditation: Ohio Department of Education
- NCES District ID: 3904922

Students and staff
- Enrollment: 1,401 (2024–25)
- Staff: 88.61 (FTE)
- Student–teacher ratio: 15.81
- District mascot: Pirates
- Colors: Maroon and gold

Other information
- Website: www.sepirates.org

The Southeast Local School District is a school district located in southeastern Portage County, Ohio, United States. It serves students in grades K–12 living in Charlestown, Deerfield, Edinburg, Palmyra, and Paris townships. The school district includes one high school, one middle school, and two elementary schools. All school buildings and the district offices are located in Palmyra Township.

== History ==
The Southeast Local School District was created in 1950 with the consolidation of five rural districts in southeastern Portage County: Charlestown, Deerfield, Edinburg, Palmyra, and Paris. At the time, the state of Ohio had started evaluating schools and revoking charters of high schools that did not meet specific enrollment, facility, and curriculum standards. In January 1950, the state announced that three high schools in Portage County failed to meet its standards and would close by the end of June 1950. Deerfield High School was one of the three, while Charlestown, Palmyra, and Paris were threatened with closure. Deerfield officials unsuccessfully appealed their closure to the state in March and by late April, a merger agreement had been reached, approved by each local district, and received approval from the Portage County Board of Education.

Until a new building could be constructed, high school students met in the former Edinburg Township School while students in grades one through eight met at the remaining four township schools. At first the new school did not have a name but was referred to as "the new school in the southeast district of Portage County" or "Southeast Portage County Consolidated High School". The student body of 1951 voted to adopt the name Southeast, along with the mascot and school colors. Out of eight selections the students went with the nickname 'Pirates' and chose the colors maroon and gold over black and white.

The current home of Southeast High School opened in September 1954, located on the western edge of Palmyra Township. In the early 1970s, a consolidated elementary school was built on the western end of the high school campus. Additions to the high school building were constructed in the 1960s, 1980s, and 2000s. While the last of the high school's renovations occurred in the 2000s, the high school students were actually housed in the newly constructed middle school. The new middle school was completed in 2003.

== Schools ==
=== High school ===
- Southeast High School, grades 9–12

=== Middle school ===
- Southeast Middle School, grades 6–8

=== Elementary schools ===
- Southeast Intermediate School, grades 3–5
- Southeast Primary School, grades K–3

=== Former schools ===
- Charlestown Elementary School
- Deerfield Elementary School
- Edinburg Elementary School
- Palmyra Elementary School
- Paris Elementary School
