= WGSF =

WGSF may refer to:

- WGSF (AM), a radio station (1030 AM) licensed to Memphis, Tennessee, United States
- WGSF (TV), a defunct television station in Newark, Ohio, United States
