= Southeast High School (Ohio) =

School in Portage County, Ohio, United States

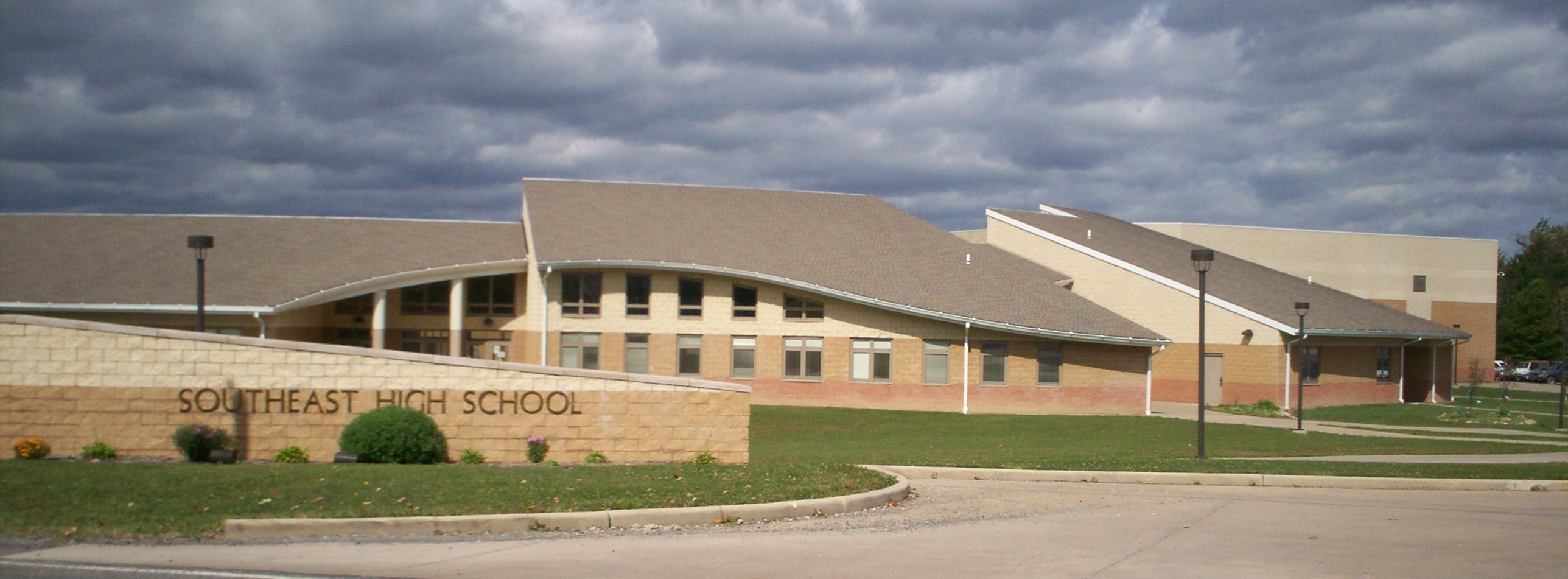

Location
- 8423 Tallmadge Road; Ravenna, Ohio 44266; United States; 41°06′00″N 81°05′15″W

Information
- Funding type: Public
- Founded: 1950
- School district: Southeast Local School District
- Principal: Steve Sigworth
- Teaching staff: 27.97 (FTE)
- Grades: 9–12
- Enrollment: 424 (2024–2025)
- Student to teacher ratio: 15.16
- Language: English
- Campus: Rural
- Colors: Maroon and Gold
- Fight song: Across the Field
- Athletics conference: Mahoning Valley Athletic Conference
- Team name: Pirates
- Accreditation: Ohio Department of Education
- Yearbook: Pirates Log
- Communities served: Charlestown, Deerfield, Edinburg, Palmyra, and Paris townships
- Website: www.sepirates.org/o/shs

Southeast High School is a public high school located in the southeastern portion of Portage County in Palmyra Township near Ravenna, Ohio, United States. It is the only high school in the Southeast Local School District and was established in 1950 with the consolidation of five rural high schools. The current building opened in 1954 with additions built in the 1960s, 1980s, and 2000s. The district covers nearly 100 square miles (260 km^{2}) including the entire townships of Edinburg and Palmyra, as well as most of Paris, Deerfield and Charlestown townships.

== History ==
The Southeast Local School District was created in 1950 with the consolidation of five rural districts in southeastern Portage County: Charlestown, Deerfield, Edinburg, Palmyra, and Paris. Until a new building could be constructed, high school students met in the former Edinburg Township School while students in grades one through eight met at the remaining four township schools. At first the new school did not have a name but was referred to as "the new school in the southeast district of Portage County." The student body of 1951 voted to adopt the name Southeast.

The current home of Southeast High School opened in September 1954, located on the western edge of Palmyra Township. In the early 1970s, a consolidated elementary school was built on the western end of the high school campus. Additions to the high school building were constructed in the 1960s, 1980s, and 2000s. While the last of the high school's renovations occurred in the 2000s, the high school students were actually housed in the newly constructed middle school. The new middle school was completed in 2003.

== Athletics ==
The team name and colors were chosen by the student body in 1951. Out of eight selections the students went with the nickname Pirates and chose the colors maroon and gold over black and white. Currently the school fields 19 varsity sports along with many having junior varsity teams as well. The school is a member of the Ohio High School Athletic Association (OHSAA) where they compete in Division V for football, baseball, softball, boys & girls basketball, girls volleyball, and boys soccer, Division IV for girls soccer, Division III for wrestling, and Division II in all other sports. These teams all compete in the Mahoning Valley Athletic Conference (MVAC).

=== State championships ===
- Boys wrestling – 1973, 1991
- Girls cross country – 1983, 1984, 1985
- Girls track and field – 1985

== Notable alumni ==
- Larry Kehres, Class of 1967; former football coach for University of Mount Union
