= Riverdale School District =

Riverdale School District may refer to:

- Riverdale School District (New Jersey)
- Riverdale Local School District in Ohio
- Riverdale School District (Oregon)
- Riverdale School District (Wisconsin)
- Riverdale School District 89 in North Dakota
