= Berlin Center =

Berlin Center may refer to the following places in the United States:

- Berlin Center, Michigan in Ionia County
- Berlin Center, Ohio in Mahoning County

== See also ==
- Mitte, the center of Berlin, Germany
