= Yale, Ohio =

Unincorporated community in Ohio, U.S.

Coordinates: 41°03′45″N 81°05′54″W

Yale is an unincorporated community in Portage County, in the U.S. state of Ohio. It centered at the intersection of Alliance Road and Yale Road along Ohio State Route 14 where the townships of Edinburg, Palmyra, Atwater, and Deerfield meet.

== History ==
A post office called Yale was established in 1883, and remained in operation until 1903. The community most likely was named after Yale University, according to local history. Besides the post office, Yale had a sawmill.

Yale was also the childhood home of famous actor Clark Gable. His father and step mother are buried in Palmyra Cemetery. A large amount of money was donated to the township to keep this cemetery and graves tended for time immemorial.

== Points of Interest ==
There is an ODOT station located here.
