= Western Reserve Local School District =

School district in Ohio, United States

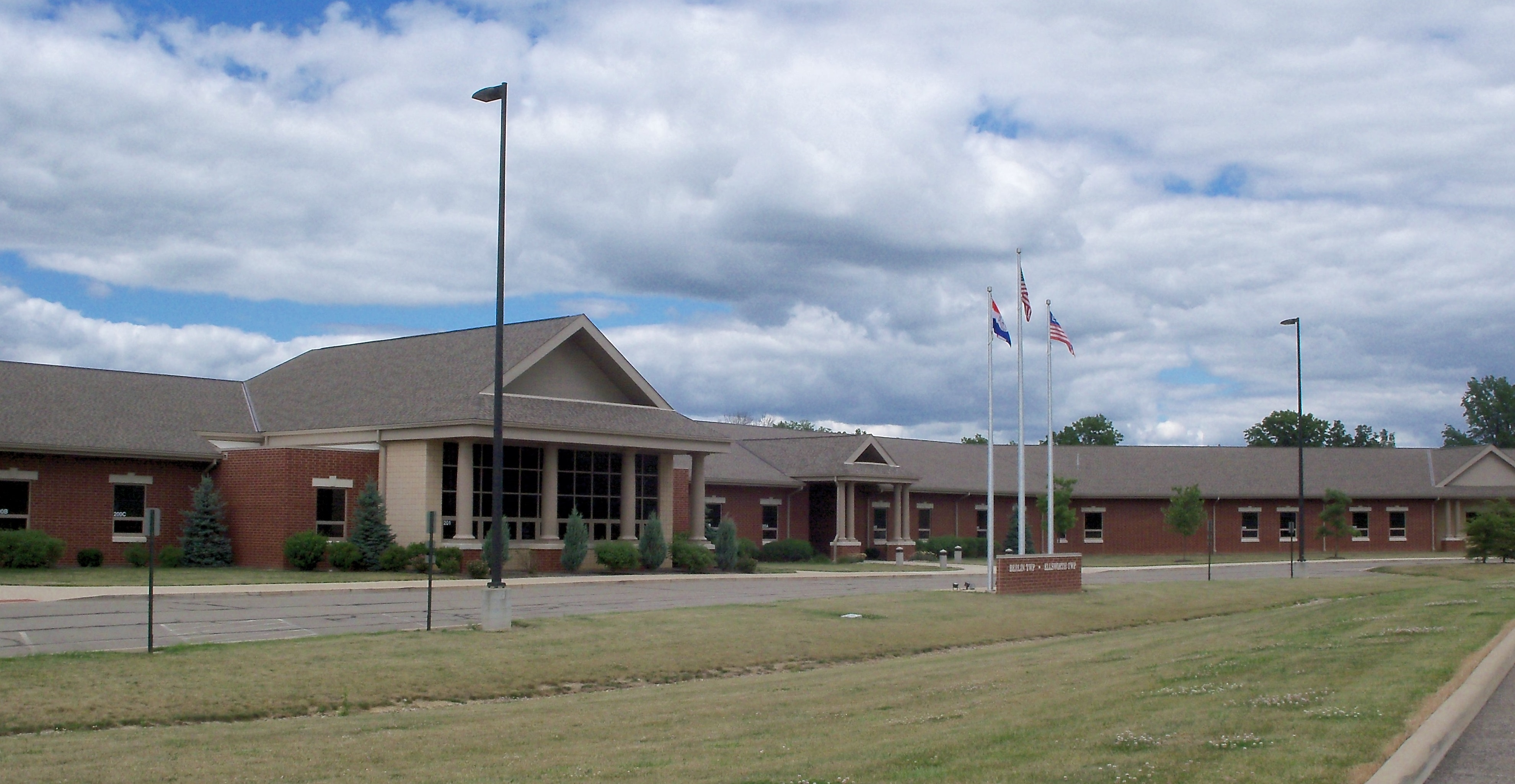
- Western Reserve K-12 building

Address
- 13850 West Akron-Canfield Road Berlin Center, Ohio, 44401; United States
- Coordinates: 41°01′31.9″N 80°54′47.3″W

District information
- Type: Public
- Grades: K-12
- Superintendent: Dallas Saunders
- Accreditation: Ohio Department of Education
- NCES District ID: 3904839

Students and staff
- Enrollment: 542 (2024–25)
- Staff: 45.00 (FTE)
- Student–teacher ratio: 12.04
- District mascot: Blue Devils
- Colors: Blue, Red, & White

The Western Reserve Local School District is a school district located in northeastern Mahoning County, Ohio. The districts serves students in grades K-12 living in Berlin Center, Ellsworth, North Benton and a small portion of Greenford townships. The district consists of one high school, one middle school and one elementary school. The K-12 building and offices are located in Berlin Center.

== History ==
The Western Reserve Local School District was formed in the mid 1900s, with the consolidation of Berlin Center and Ellsworth township schools.

The original Western Reserve High School building was built in 1949, with another location being built in 1964 and used until 2011, when the new K-12 building was opened at its current location. All other schools in the district were demolished in 2012.

== Schools ==
=== High school ===
- Western Reserve High School

=== Middle school ===
- Western Reserve Middle School

=== Elementary school ===
- Western Reserve Elementary School

=== Former schools ===
- Western Reserve Junior High School
