= WGSF (TV) =

Television station in Newark, Ohio (1963–1976)

Newark, Ohio; United States
- Channels: Analog: 31 (UHF)

Programming
- Affiliations: NET (1963–1970); PBS (1970–1976)

Ownership
- Owner: Newark City School District
- Operator: The Licking County Fund for Public Giving

History
- First air date: March 18, 1963
- Last air date: June 30, 1976; (13 years, 104 days)
- Former channel number(s): 28 (UHF, 1963–1970)

WGSF (channel 31) was an educational television station in Newark, Ohio, United States, which operated from 1963 to 1976. The station was founded by The Licking County Fund for Public Giving, on behalf of the Newark City School District. Studios were originated at Newark High School.

In the early years of the station, WGSF broadcast on UHF channel 28, programming a mix of local programming, with additional programs from National Educational Television (via film and videotape), and from WOSU-TV in Columbus (via an off-air pickup). Equipment and cameras were lent to WGSF by WCET, Cincinnati's educational station. In 1966, WCET took back the cameras, when WGSF was unable to buy them; soon after this, Cleveland’s then CBS affiliate WJW-TV donated two cameras to WGSF.

The station broadcast on channel 28 until 1970, when the Ohio ETV Network Commission, The Ohio State University (owners of WOSU), and Nationwide Broadcasting requested that the station move to channel 31, with Nationwide providing funds for the move. In 1970, WGSF became a member station of PBS, and was soon connected to the national feed, ending reliance of WOSU for networked programming.

WGSF signed off on June 30, 1976, not only due to aging equipment, but due to opportunities for Newark City Schools to operate a channel on cable TV (due to laws mandating cable systems to devote a channel for educational television use), as well as opportunities for Ohio's PBS member stations to expand to underserved communities. The following day after the station's closedown, WOSU opened W31AA, a low-power repeater operating on the former WGSF's channel. (W31AA would close down in 2009 following WOSU-TV's conversion to digital.) Newark City Schools' cable channel would open in 1977, after the local cable franchise provided a cable link to Newark High.

Channel 28 would be reallocated to Columbus as a commercial frequency; this channel would be reactivated when WTTE signed on in 1984.

In 2003, Newark High School's Brad Philhower and Nick Iannitto produced a documentary on the 40th anniversary of WGSF titled Ruby Waves. The documentary can be viewed on the Facebook page of Newark City Schools' news program, The Wildcat Network, formerly known as Wildcat News Net. The Facebook page also hosts numerous historical pictures of WGSF.

== See also ==
- List of television stations in Ohio
