= Newark City School District =

Ohio public school district

Location
- Newark, Ohio; United States
- Coordinates: 40°4′25.38″N 82°24′48.64″W

District information
- Type: Public
- Grades: Pre-K through 12
- Established: July 20, 1848; 178 years ago
- Superintendent: David L. Lewis
- Budget: $77,107,602
- NCES District ID: 3904445

Students and staff
- Students: 5,827 (2023–24)
- Teachers: 342.02 (on an FTE basis)
- Student–teacher ratio: 17.16

Other information
- Website: www.newarkcityschools.org

Newark City School District is a public school district in the city of Newark, Ohio, United States. The district is the largest in Licking County, with nearly 6,500 students.

== District history ==
The district was formed in 1848 after the passage of a voter petition to unify the schools in Newark under one system. The first school board was elected on September 19, 1849. A "Negro school" operated from 1859 until 1888 to provide segregated education to African American children in the Newark district.

At the request of the U.S. government in 1940, the district initiated industrial training programs that were intended to assist in national defense. The shops operated 24 hours a day, six days a week, and after the attack on Pearl Harbor, became directly funded by the government to expand into a second building and thirty-five classes. It has been estimated that the district trained 8,000 people between 1940 and 1945 with skills essential to the national defense industries.

As of 2005, three additional elementary schools and two middle schools are slated to begin construction.

In mid-2005 Newark City Schools began to phase out its former system of schooling. Under the former system, grades K-4th went to elementary school, grades 5th-6th went to intermediate school, 7th-8th went to middle school, and grades 9th-12th went to High School. Under the reformed system of schooling, grades K-5 go to elementary school, 6-8 goes to middle school, and 9-12 goes to high school. Former intermediate schools include Central Intermediate and West Main Intermediate. Central is now a private school and West Main is an apartment complex.

The elementary schools are William McGuffey, Carson, Cherry Valley, Hillview, John Clem and Legend Elementary Schools. The middle schools are Heritage (replaced Lincoln), Liberty Middle School (replaced Roosevelt) and Wilson Middle School.

== District management ==
The district's Board of Education consists of five citizens elected to staggered four-year terms, with one president, one vice-president, and three members. In addition to the general goal of educating the district's students, the Board has the specific duties of hiring the district's superintendent and treasurer, overseeing the annual budget, and approving contracts with district employees. Board meetings are open to the public and held in the high school library.

The superintendent is directly responsible to the district Board of Education, and implements board policies. S/he administers the district's educational programs and has final responsibility for curriculum, staffing, and evaluation. All district employees are responsible to the superintendent, except for the treasurer, who is also a direct employee of the board. In cooperation with the superintendent, the treasurer manages the district's financial, legal and contractual affairs.

== Board of education ==
- President - Cindy Neely
- Vice President - Thomas Bline
- Member - Mark Christenberry
- Member - Daniel Hunt
- Member - Joe Quackenbush

== District Administration ==
- Superintendent of Schools- David Lewis (since 2020)
- Assistant Superintendent for Curriculum & Staff Development-
- Assistant Superintendent for Certificated & Licensed Personnel- Barbara Quackenbush
- District Treasurer/CFO - Julio Valladares

== Schools ==
=== Newark Digital Academy ===
Grades K-12. An online, state-accredited distance learning program.

- Principal- Angie Adkins
- Dean of Students- Matt Phillips
- School Social Worker- Brandi Moffitt

=== Newark High School ===
Grades 9–12. Average enrollment is approximately 1200 students; an additional 150 students attend the Career Technical Education Center (C-TEC) associated with the school. The staff is around 190. The high school was originally built in 1887 as a series of buildings, before being partially rebuilt in 1959 (re-opened in 1961), and later undergoing massive renovations, additions, connections between the separate buildings, and major demolition in the early 2010s. Newark plays division I athletics in the Central Ohio Division of the Ohio Capital Conference. Major athletics rivalries are with Lancaster High School and Zanesville High School.

Building Administration

- Principal- Thomas G. Bowman
- Assistant Principal- Matthew Hazelton
- Assistant Principal- Tammy Powell
- Assistant Principal- Samuel Gamertsfelder
- Alternative Academy Principal- Scott Beery

Guidance & Counseling

- School Counselor- Molly Stayer
- School Counselor- Luke Johnston
- School Counselor- Michelle Lott
- School Counselor- Scott Koebel

Department of Fine Arts

- Director of Orchestras- Ashley Rudd
- Director of Bands- Lee Auer
- Director of Theatre- P. David Williams
- Director of Choirs- Russell Nutt

== A Call to College ==
A Call to College is a non-profit organization founded in 1988 by Jane Cook McConnell and Lou Mitchell to work with Newark City Schools to help promote college access for students in Newark, Ohio.

Administration

- Executive Director - Tara Houdeshell
- Associate Director for Programming - Shannon Chiacchira
- Director of Early Awareness- Janet Shultz
- Director of College Preparation & Success- Jennifer Anthony
- Director of College Preparation & Success - Brett Underhill

=== Middle schools ===
Grades 6-9 . Wilson (built in the early 1920s) is the oldest of the three Middle schools. Liberty is the newest, opening in 2007. Two former Middle schools of Newark include Roosevelt Middle School (now the Administrative Service Building, which is used for important events, such as the Student of the Month Luncheon, as well as the monthly (and special) School Board meetings) and Lincoln Middle School. Both were built in the late 1800s.

- Heritage Middle School
- Principal- Kyle Walters
- Dean of Students- Mackenzie Riley
- Linkage Coordinator- Dava Pinney
- Liberty Middle School
- Principal- Renee Derr
- Dean of Students- Adam Rose
- Linkage Coordinator- James McMillian
- Wilson Middle School
- Principal- Whitney Bobo
- Dean of Students- Matthew Phillips
- Linkage Coordinator- Shae Bailey

=== Former middle schools ===
- Lincoln Middle School (Originally Abraham Lincoln Junior High School)
- Roosevelt Middle School (Originally Franklin D. Roosevelt Junior High School, now used as the Administrative Service Building)
- Central Junior High School (Renamed John F. Kennedy Junior High School briefly, name reverted to Central School when it was converted to use as an Intermediate school).
- Benjamin Franklin Junior High School (Now Benjamin Franklin Elementary School)

=== Former intermediate schools ===
- Central Intermediate School (now a privately owned school)
- West Main Intermediate School (now the temporary home of McGuffey Elementary School)
- Kettering Intermediate School (Was changed to Elementary school until it was demolished)

=== Elementary schools ===
Grades PK-5

- Ben Franklin Elementary School
- Principal- Dena Cable-Miller
- Dean of Students- Lynda Nabors
- Carson Elementary School
- Principal- Julie Elwell
- Dean of Students- Amy Cox
- Cherry Valley Elementary School
- Principal- Chester Coleman
- Dean of Students- Jennifer Stokes
- Hillview Elementary School
- Principal- Nicholas Myers
- Dean of Students- Brett Montgomery
- Johnny Clem Elementary School
- Principal- Andrea McVey
- Dean of Students- Jennifer Stokes
- Legend Elementary School
- Principal- Ann Davis
- Dean of Students- Amy Cox
- William H. McGuffey Elementary School
- Principal- Cynthia M. Baker
- Dean of Students- Brett Montgomery

=== Former elementary schools ===
- Riverside School (Demolished in the 1950s)
- Mound Elementary School (Now an architecture firm)
- South Fifth Street School
- South Third Street School
- William E. Miller Elementary School (Now a branch of Mount Vernon Nazarene University)
- North Elementary School (Demolished in late 2009)
- Conrad Elementary School
- East Main Street School
- Maholm Elementary School (Now a private school)
- Hartzler School
- Kettering Elementary School (Demolished, originally Kettering Intermediate School)
- Hazelwood Elementary School (Now a Church Ministry)
- Helen Keller Elementary School (Now Licking County Alcohol Prevention Program-LAPP)
- Woodside Elementary School (Now Newark Digital Academy)
- North Fourth Street School

== See also ==
- WGSF (TV)—defunct television station owned by the school district; lives on today as a cable channel
- List of school districts in Ohio
