= Riverdale Local School District =

School district in Ohio, United States

Address
- 20613 State Route 37 Mount Blanchard, Ohio, 45867; United States
- Coordinates: 40°52′00″N 83°31′06″W

District information
- Type: Public
- Grades: K–12
- Established: 1960
- Superintendent: Greg Rossman
- NCES District ID: 3904751

Students and staff
- Students: 947 (2024–25)
- Teachers: 54.29
- Staff: 58.89

Other information
- Website: www.riverdalefalcons.org

Riverdale Local School District is a public school district based in Delaware Township near Mount Blanchard, Ohio, United States. The district was founded in 1960 through the consolidation of the Forest, Wharton, and Mount Blanchard districts. All grades are housed in the Riverdale K–12 building, which opened in 2004.

== History ==
The Riverdale Local School District was established January 1, 1960, by consolidating the districts of Forest, Mount Blanchard, and Wharton, Ohio. The district's formation was of interest at the time because it involved communities in three separate counties. Initially, the three separate schools continued to operate as K–12 schools while the new high school, which had been approved by voters in November 1960, was constructed. With the completion and opening of Riverdale High School in August 1962, located on rural land in between the three towns, students in grades nine through twelve were sent to RHS while the remaining schools became K–8 schools. In 1974, the district reorganized again, with seventh and eighth graders being sent to the Wharton building, which became Riverdale Junior High School and later Riverdale Middle School. This was done as a result of unbalanced class sizes between the three buildings. With the move of grades seven and eight to Wharton, the Mt. Blanchard and Forest buildings became K–6 elementary schools. An earlier plan to make the Forest building the junior high in 1973 had been opposed by a large group of parents.

The district centralized all grades at a new K–12 building, which opened in January 2004 on the high school campus. The original high school building was converted to house the district offices, a head start program, and other school functions. The Mt. Blanchard, Forest, and Wharton buildings were all razed in 2004.

== Schools ==
- Riverdale High School, grades 9–12
- Riverdale Middle School, grades 6–8
- Riverdale Elementary School, grades K–5
