= Columbian High School =

Location
- 300 South Monroe Street; Tiffin, Ohio 44883; United States; 41°06′31″N 83°10′41″W

Information
- Type: Public
- Established: 1859
- School district: Tiffin City School District
- Principal: Tim Murray
- Faculty: 67
- Grades: 9–12
- Colors: Navy blue and Vegas gold
- Athletics conference: Northern Ohio Conference
- Mascot: Teddy Tornado
- Team name: Tornadoes
- Rival: Bellevue Redmen
- Website: www.tiffincityschools.org/about-tcs/our-schools/columbian-high-school

Columbian High School is a comprehensive public high school in Tiffin, Ohio, United States. It is the only public high school in the Tiffin City School District. Their nickname is the Tornadoes. A long-time member of the Northern Ohio League (1954-2017), Tiffin Columbian joined the Sandusky Bay Conference in 2017. They left the Sandusky Bay Conference in 2026 with nine other schools to form the Northern Ohio Conference. The school has 850 students. The school was founded in 1859 and the current building was constructed in 1959. The building was named for the 1893 World's Columbian Exposition, the world's fair that celebrated the 400th anniversary of Christopher Columbus' arrival to the New World. Tim Murray is the principal at the school. Amy Hineline is the assistant principal. Brad Scheiber is the Dean of Students

Columbian's Frost-Kalnow Stadium is a 4,500 seat facility that is used by Columbian, Calvert Catholic Schools, and Tiffin University.

== Curriculum ==
Columbian High School offers a comprehensive curriculum. Several Advanced Placement classes are offered, including AP United States History, AP Calculus, AP Biology, AP English Language and Composition, AP English Literature and Composition, and more. The school also offers two foreign language courses, Spanish and Mandarin Chinese. AP classes that are not offered can be taken online through the Virtual High School Collaborative.

Students at Columbian can participate in the College Credit Plus program, which allows them to attend classes at Heidelberg University, Tiffin University, Terra Community College, and more, in order to earn college credit.
