= Buckeye Central High School =

Location
- 938 South Kibler Street; New Washington, (Crawford County), Ohio 44854; United States
- 40°57′22″N 82°51′6″W

Information
- Type: Public, Coeducational high school
- Superintendent: Mark Robinson
- Principal: Michael Martin
- Teaching staff: 12.60 (FTE)
- Grades: 9-12
- Student to teacher ratio: 14.84
- Colors: Scarlet and gray
- Fight song: Onward Bucks (On Wisconsin)
- Athletics conference: Northern 10 Athletic Conference
- Mascot: Bucky (a Buck deer)
- Team name: Bucks
- Athletic Director: Phil Loy
- Band Director: Megan Hiler
- Website: bch.buckeye-central.org

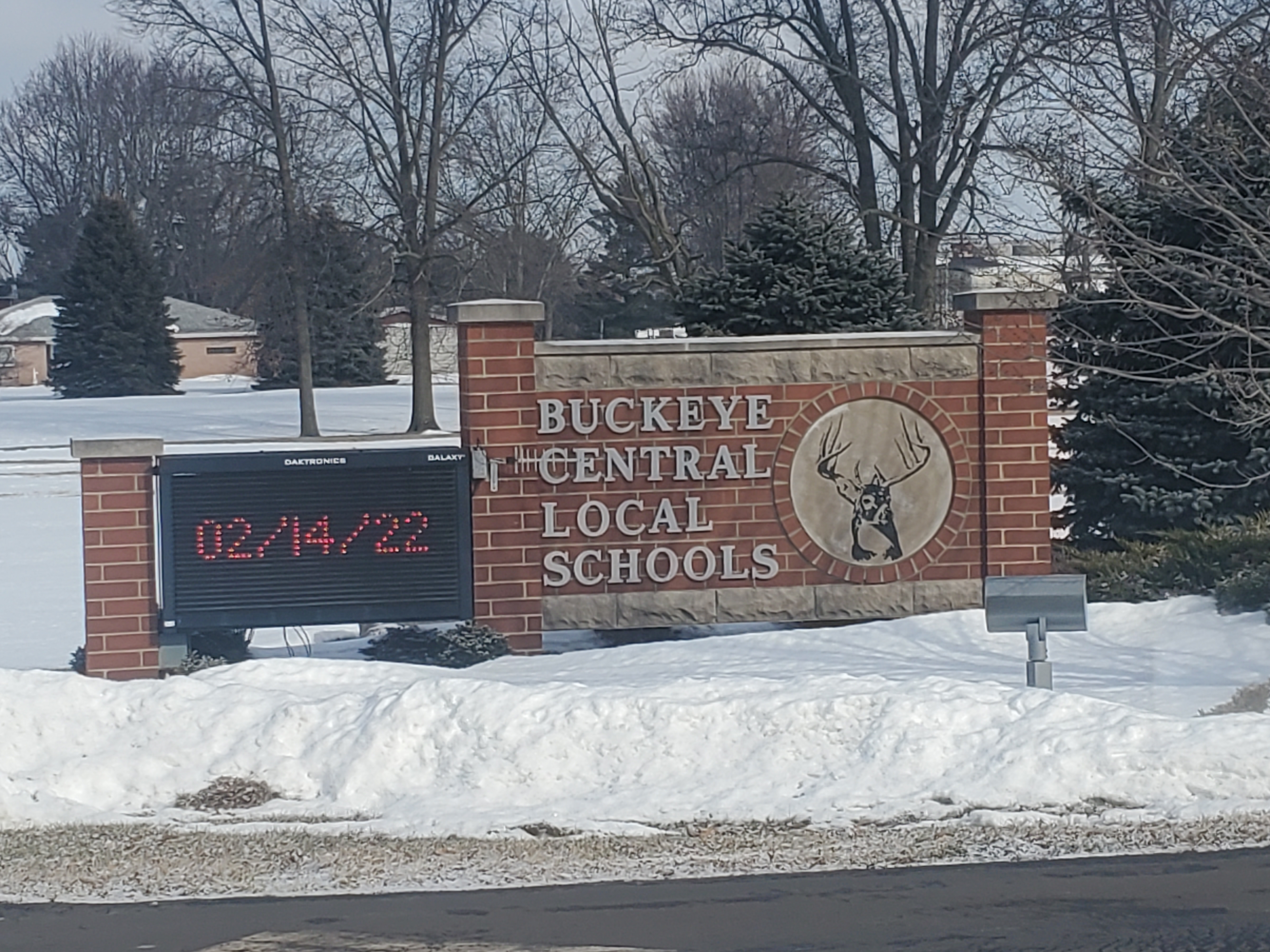
Buckeye Central High School

Buckeye Central High School is a public high school in New Washington, Ohio. It is the only high school in the Buckeye Central Local School District.

== Ohio High School Athletic Association State Championships ==
- Girls Basketball – 1985
- Girls Volleyball – 1993, 1996
