= Edgewood Senior High School =

Edgewood High School

Location
- 2428 Blake Road; Ashtabula, Ashtabula County, Ohio 44004; United States
- Coordinates: 41°53′10″N 80°43′52″W

Information
- Type: Public, Coeducational
- School district: Buckeye Local School District
- Superintendent: Patrick Colucci
- NCES School ID: 390458502358
- Principal: Joseph Gerics
- Teaching staff: 30.00 (FTE)
- Grades: 9-12
- Enrollment: 493 (2023-2024)
- Student to teacher ratio: 16.43
- Colors: Scarlet and Gray
- Athletics conference: Chagrin Valley Conference
- Team name: Warriors
- Website: www.buckeyeschools.info

Edgewood High School is a public high school in Edgewood, Ohio, in Ashtabula Township. It is the only high school in the Buckeye Local School District. Athletic Teams are known as the Warriors and they complete as a member of the Ohio High School Athletic Association in the Chagrin Valley Conference.

== History ==
Before the current Edgewood High School was built, the building now used as Braden Middle School served as the district's high school. The current location was opened in 1960.

== Athletics ==
=== Ohio High School Athletic Association State Championships ===
Boys Cross Country – 1990, 2003

== Notable alumni ==
- Freddie Smith - actor
