= St. Clairsville-Richland City School District =

School district in Ohio, United States

Address
- 108 Woodrow Avenue Saint Clairsville, Ohio, 43950; United States
- Coordinates: 40.07944°N 80.89583°W

District information
- Type: Public
- Grades: PK–12
- Schools: 3
- NCES District ID: 3904599

Students and staff
- Students: 1,619 (2024–2025)
- Teachers: 90.96 (on an FTE basis) (2024–2025)
- Staff: 198.87 (on an FTE basis) (2024–2025)
- Student–teacher ratio: 17.80 (2024–2025)

Other information
- Website: www.stcschools.com

The St. Clairsville-Richland City School District serves St. Clairsville, Ohio and the surrounding areas.

== Board of education ==
- Michael Jacob, President
- Michael Fador, Vice President
- Amy Porter, Treasurer
- James Cook
- Harry White
- Bill Zanders
- Walter E. Skaggs, Superintendent

== School Administrators ==
- Middle School Principal Mike McKeever
- Elementary School Principal Amber Shepherd-Smith

== See also ==
- East Central Ohio ESC
