= Newark High School (Ohio) =

Public, coeducational high school in Newark, Ohio, United States

Location
- 314 Granville Street; Newark, Ohio, (Licking County) 43055; United States; 40°3′57″N 82°25′8″W

Information
- Type: Public, coeducational high school
- Motto: It's a Great Time to be a cat!
- Opened: 1961
- School district: Newark City School District
- Superintendent: David L. Lewis
- Principal: Tom Bowman
- Teaching staff: 69.37 (FTE)
- Grades: 9-12
- Enrollment: 1,369 (2024–25)
- Student to teacher ratio: 19.73
- Colors: Crimson and white
- Fight song: Across the Field
- Athletics conference: Ohio Capital Conference
- Team name: Wildcats
- Rival: Lancaster High School (Ohio), Zanesville High School
- Accreditation: North Central Association of Colleges and Schools
- Yearbook: The Reveille
- Athletic Director: Jeffery Quackenbush
- Website: https://nhs.newarkcityschools.org/

Newark High School is a public high school in Newark, Ohio. It houses a little more than 2,000 students. It is the only high school in the Newark City School District.

An additional 150 students attend the Career and Technical Education Center (C-TEC) associated with the school. Newark High School was built in 1959 and opened in 1961. The school underwent a massive construction project beginning in the Summer of 2010 and completed in the Spring of 2013 to convert the school into one building with 6 classroom wings, a student commons, a gymnasium, an auditorium, and the facility in which the entire district's lunches are produced. Newark plays division I athletics in the Ohio Division of the Ohio Capital Conference. Major athletics rivalries are with Lancaster High School and Zanesville High School.

The school's C-TEC satellite program includes a broadcasting department, which enables students to participate in activities such as operating a closed-circuit television station.

The school's Latin Club functions as a local chapter of both the Ohio Junior Classical League (OJCL) and National Junior Classical League (NJCL).

== Auditorium ==
The Lawrence E. Griffin Performing Arts Center was built in 1970. James Swearingen wrote the piece "Proud Spirit" for Lawence E. Griffin and was first performed by the Pride of Newark at the dedication of the auditorium. The NHS auditorium seats 1047 people. The first recording made there was of the NHS Choirs on April 28 and May 1, 1970.

== Notable alumni ==
- Gary A. Braunbeck - award-winning author.
- Gil English - Former MLB player (New York Giants, Detroit Tigers, Boston Bees, Brooklyn Dodgers)
- Woody English - Former MLB player (Chicago Cubs, Brooklyn Dodgers)
- Derek Holland - Former MLB pitcher (Texas Rangers, Chicago White Sox, San Francisco Giants, Chicago Cubs, Pittsburgh Pirates, Detroit Tigers)
- Jay Hottinger - Republican member of the Ohio Senate for the 31st district
- Jerrie Mock - First woman to fly around the world solo in 1964
- Fred Schaus - Professional basketball player in the NBA (Detroit Pistons) and coach in the NBA (Los Angeles Lakers)
- Jim Tyrer - Professional football player in the NFL (Kansas City Chiefs and Washington Redskins)
- Michael Z. Williamson - author

== Ohio High School Athletic Association State Championships ==
- Boys basketball - 1936, 1938, 1943, 2008
