= Ross Local School District =

School district in Ohio, United States

Address
- 3371 Hamilton Cleves Road Hamilton, Ohio, 45013; United States

District information
- Type: Public
- Grades: PK–12
- Superintendent: Dr Chad Konkel
- Schools: 5
- NCES District ID: 3904614

Students and staff
- Students: 2,607 (2024–2025)
- Teachers: 131.65 (on an FTE basis) (2024–2025)
- Staff: 268.90 (on an FTE basis) (2024–2025)
- Student–teacher ratio: 19.80 (2024–2025)

Other information
- Website: www.rossrams.com

The Ross Local School District is a public school district in Butler County, southwestern Ohio, United States, based in Hamilton, Ohio.

== Schools ==
The Ross Local School District has two elementary schools, one middle school, and one high school.

=== Elementary schools ===
- Elda Elementary School
- Morgan Elementary School

=== Intermediate Schools ===
- Ross Intermediate School

=== Middle school ===
- Ross Middle School

=== High school ===
- Ross High School
