= Howland Local School District =

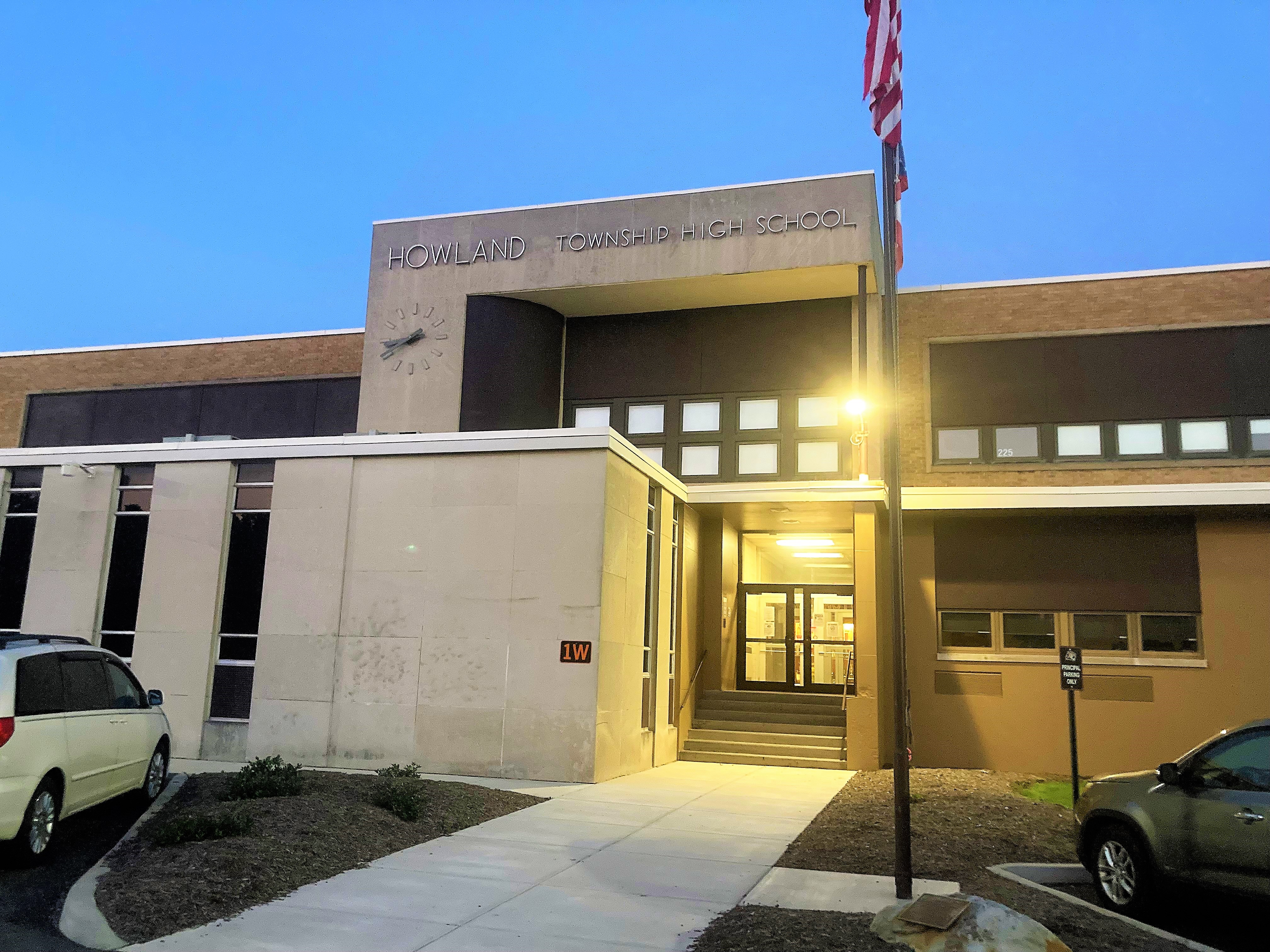
- Howland High School

Location
- 8200 South St SE; Warren, Ohio 44484; United States

Information
- Type: Public
- Opened: 1917
- NCES School ID: 3905016
- Teaching staff: 140.71 (FTE)
- Grades: PK-12
- Enrollment: 2,283 (2024-25)
- Student to teacher ratio: 16.22
- Colors: Blue and Green
- Athletics conference: All-American Conference
- Team name: Tigers
- Website: www.howlandschools.com/o/hhs

The Howland Local School District is a school district located in Howland Township, Trumbull County, Ohio United States. the school district serves one high school, one junior school, and 3 elementary schools.

== History ==
Howland Local School District was formed in 1917, with the consolidation of five one-room rural schools.

Howlands current high school was opened in 1949. The district underwent a reorganization in the 2010s, with the closure of several schools announced in 2015.

In 2019, the Howland Board of Education voted to close the North Road School, citing declining enrollment and operational efficiency. The move saved the district roughly $500,000 annually. Fifth grade students who occupied the building was moved into the middle school in the 2019–20 school year.

== Schools ==
=== High School ===
- Howland High School

=== Middle School ===
- Howland Junior High School

=== Elementary Schools ===
- Howland Glen Primary School
- Howland Springs Elementary School
- H.C. Mines Elementary School

=== Former Schools ===
- North Road School
- Howland Township School
- Bolindale School
- Howland Corners School
