= Spencerville Local School District =

School district in Ohio, United States

Address
- 600 School St Spencerville, Ohio, 45887; United States
- Coordinates: 40°42′32″N 84°21′6″W

District information
- Type: Public
- Grades: KG–12
- Schools: 3
- NCES District ID: 3904580

Students and staff
- Students: 986 (2025–2026)
- Teachers: 54.78 (on an FTE basis) (2025–2026)
- Staff: 118.94 (on an FTE basis) (2025–2026)
- Student–teacher ratio: 18.00 (2025–2026)

Other information
- Website: www.spencervillebearcats.com

Spencerville Public Schools is a school district in Northwest Ohio. The school district serves students who live in the village of Spencerville, located in Allen County. The superintendent is Cindy Endsley.

== Schools ==
=== Grades 9-12 ===
- Spencerville High School

=== Grades 6-8 ===
- Spencerville Middle School

=== Grades 4-5 ===
- Spencerville Jennings Elementary School

=== Grades PK-3 ===
- Spencerville Elementary Schools
