= Ottawa Hills Local School District =

School district in Ohio, United States

Address
- 4035 West Central Avenue Toledo, Ohio, 43606; United States
- Coordinates: 41°40′11″N 83°38′24″W

District information
- Type: Public
- Motto: "Defined by Excellence. Supported by Tradition."
- Grades: KG–12
- Established: September 1925; 101 years ago
- Schools: 2
- NCES District ID: 3904821

Students and staff
- Students: 1,029 (2024–2025)
- Teachers: 64.73 (on an FTE basis) (2024–2025)
- Staff: 154.59 (on an FTE basis) (2024–2025)
- Student–teacher ratio: 15.90 (2024–2025)

Other information
- Website: www.ohschools.org

Ottawa Hills Local School District is a public K-12 school district located in Northwest Ohio. The school district serves students who live in the village of Ottawa Hills, in Lucas County. The Superintendent is Dr. Adam Fineske and the Treasurer/CFO is Thomas Siloy.

== Schools ==
=== Grades 7-12 ===
- Ottawa Hills Junior/Senior High School

=== Grades K-6 ===
- Ottawa Hills Elementary School
