= Northeastern Local School District =

Northeastern Local School District may refer to:

- Northeastern Local School District (Clark County, Ohio)
- Northeastern Local School District (Defiance County, Ohio)
