= Bluffton Exempted Village School District =

School district in Ohio

Coordinates: 40°54′N 83°54′W

Location
- Bluffton, Ohio; U.S.

District information
- Type: Public School District
- Motto: “To develop individuals who demonstrate problem-solving skills, personal responsibility, and a desire for lifelong learning.”

Students and staff
- Students: Grades K-12

Other information
- Website: http://www.bluffton.noacsc.org/

Bluffton Public Schools is a school district in Northwest Ohio, United States. The school district has an open enrollment policy, meaning that students outside the district can enroll in Bluffton Public Schools, though Bluffton Public Schools primarily serves students who live in the city of Bluffton, located in Allen and Hancock counties.

== Grades 9-12 ==
- Bluffton High School

== Grades 6-8 ==
- Bluffton Middle School

== Grades K-5 ==
- Bluffton Elementary Schools
