= Palmyra Township, Portage County, Ohio =

Township in Ohio, US

Palmyra Township, Ohio
- Civil township
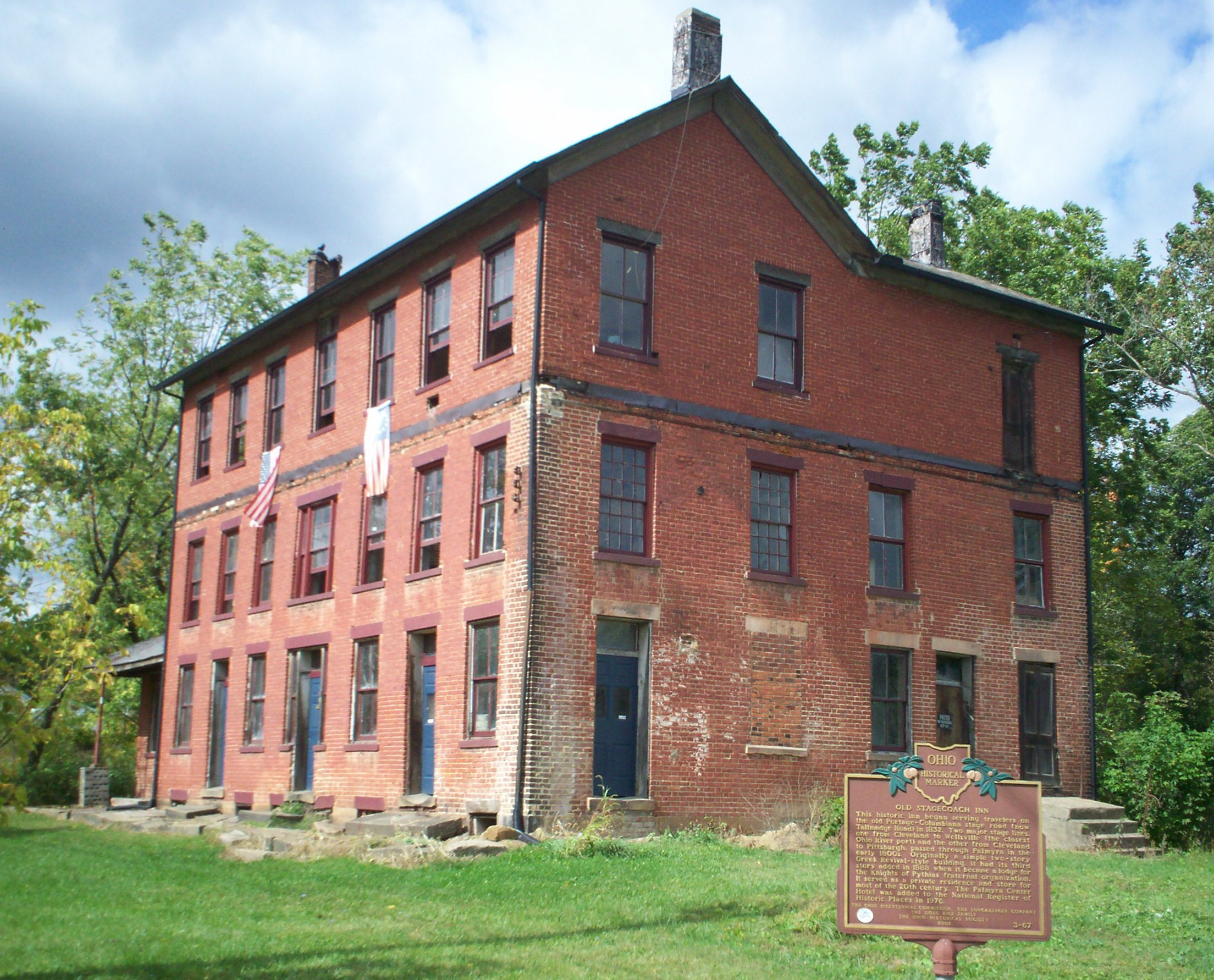
- The three-story Stagecoach stop at the center of town.
- Interactive map of Palmyra Township
- Location within Ohio Location within the United States
- Coordinates: 41°6′8″N 81°2′28″W
- Country: United States
- State: Ohio
- County: Portage

Area
  - Total: 25.6 sq mi (66.4 km^{2})
  - Land: 25.6 sq mi (66.4 km^{2})
  - Water: 0 sq mi (0.0 km^{2})
- Elevation: 1,040 ft (317 m)

Population (2020)
  - Total: 2,780
  - Density: 108/sq mi (41.9/km^{2})
- Time zone: UTC-5 (Eastern (EST))
  - Summer (DST): UTC-4 (EDT)
- FIPS code: 39-59668
- GNIS feature ID: 1086834
- Website: https://www.palmyratownship.org/

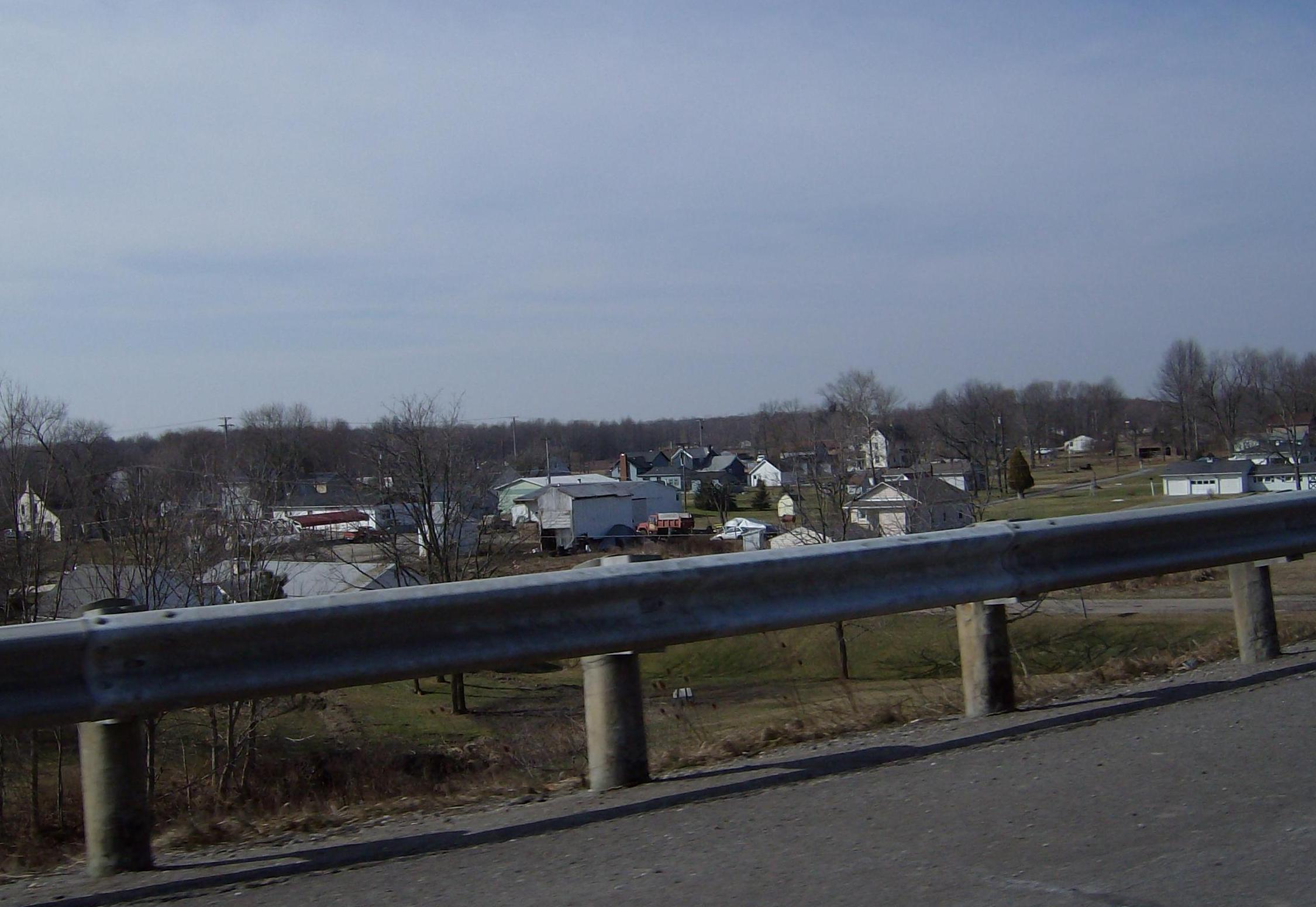
A view of the town of Diamond from Interstate 76

Palmyra Township is one of the eighteen townships of Portage County, Ohio, United States. The 2020 census found 2,780 people in the township.

== Geography ==
Located in the southeastern part of the county, it borders the following townships:

- Paris Township - north
- Newton Township, Trumbull County - northeast corner
- Milton Township, Mahoning County - east
- Berlin Township, Mahoning County - southeast corner
- Deerfield Township - south
- Atwater Township - southwest corner
- Edinburg Township - west
- Charlestown Township - northwest corner

No municipalities are located in Palmyra Township, although the unincorporated community of Diamond lies in the township's east, and the unincorporated community of Yale lies in the southwest corner of the township.

Formed from the Connecticut Western Reserve, Palmyra Township covers an area of 26 square miles (67 km^{2}).

== Name and history ==
It is the only Palmyra Township statewide. A post office called Palmyra was established in 1807, and remained in operation until 1904. The community most likely was named after Palmyra, New York. In the mid-1880s, Palmyra contained several factories, stores, and three saloons.

== Government ==
The township is governed by a three-member board of trustees, who are elected in November of odd-numbered years to a four-year term beginning on the following January 1. Two are elected in the year after the presidential election and one is elected in the year before it. There is also an elected township fiscal officer, who serves a four-year term beginning on April 1 of the year after the election, which is held in November of the year before the presidential election. Vacancies in the fiscal officership or on the board of trustees are filled by the remaining trustees.

== Education ==
Palmyra Township is served by the Southeast Local Schools, and Southeast High School is located in the township.
