= Allen East Local School District =

School district in Ohio, United States

Address
- 9105 Harding Highway Harrod, Ohio, 45850; United States
- Coordinates: 40°42′30″N 83°55′13″W

District information
- Type: Public
- Grades: PK–12
- Established: 1965
- Schools: 3
- NCES District ID: 3904575

Students and staff
- Students: 1,042 (2025–2026)
- Teachers: 56.45 (on an FTE basis) (2025–2026)
- Staff: 145.30 (on an FTE basis) (2025–2026)
- Student–teacher ratio: 18.46 (2025–2026)

Other information
- Website: www.alleneastschools.org

Allen East Public Schools is a school district in Northwest Ohio. The school district has an open enrollment policy meaning that students outside the district can enroll in Allen East Local Schools, though Allen East primarily serves students who live in the villages of Harrod, and Lafayette in Allen County. The superintendent is Mel Rentschler.

== Schools ==
- Allen East High School (grades 9–12)
- Allen East Middle School (grades 5–8)
- Allen East Elementary School (grades PK—4)
