= Tiffin City School District =

School district in Ohio, United States

Address
- 244 South Monroe Street Tiffin, Ohio, 44883; United States

District information
- Type: Public
- Grades: PreK–12
- Superintendent: Jerry Nadeau
- Schools: 6
- NCES District ID: 3904489

Students and staff
- Students: 2,420 (2025–2026)
- Teachers: 127.29 (on an FTE basis) (2025–2026)
- Staff: 315.57 (on an FTE basis) (2025–2026)
- Student–teacher ratio: 19.01 (2025–2026)
- Athletic conference: Sandusky Bay Conference

Other information
- Website: www.tiffincityschools.org

Tiffin City School District is a public school district in the city of Tiffin, Ohio, United States. Currently, there are approximately 2,850 students that attend Tiffin City Schools. This school district consists of three elementary buildings that hold two grades each, which are K-1, 2–3, and 4–5; one middle school which has grades 6-8 and one high school which contains grades 9–12. The mission statement of the school district is, “Tiffin City Schools guarantees that all students achieve success at their full learning potential.”

Columbian High School is the building that contains grades 9-12 for the district. It was built in 1960. It houses approximately 900 students and 85 staff members. Students that attend Columbian do not only have the option to take the 139 classes that are offered, they can also take courses through Post Secondary Education Options at three different institutions. Those institutions include Heidelberg University, Tiffin University, and Terra State Community College. Several students attend Sentinel Career Center and the Technology Center. There are also 17 varsity sports and 25 clubs that students can be involved with throughout the school year.

Tiffin Middle School houses grades 6–8. The school was built in 2003 making it the newest building within the school district. This school accommodates about 650 students and 65 staff members. There are many different class options that the students can choose from and there are also selected athletics that students in grades 7-8 may participate in during the school year, such as football, cross country, track, cheerleading, and basketball. Students can also participate in city-ran sports such as Big Sticks baseball, Twisters softball, and Tiffin Soccer Club.

There are also three elementary buildings that contain grades K-5. These buildings are Washington Elementary built 1955 (K-1), Krout Elementary built 1957 (2-3), and Noble Elementary built 1931 (4-5). Lincoln Elementary, built 1953, is also a part of the school district, housing Pre-K students. Lincoln enrolls about 152, Washington 363, Krout 322, and Noble 362.

== Schools ==
=== Elementary schools ===
- Lincoln Elementary School (Grade PreK) 124 Ohio Avenue
- Washington Elementary School (Grades K-1) 151 Elmer Street
- Krout Elementary School (Grades 2-3) 20 Glenn Street
- Noble Elementary School (Grades 4-5) 130 Minerva Street
- Elementary schools were formerly grades K-5 until about 2013. Students went to their school depending on their neighborhood/vicinity to a certain school. (Ex. Southern Tiffin students went to Krout Elementary). Clinton Elementary School was also one of the elementary schools used by the district until 2013. It still stands and is located at 2036 East Township Road 122. It is no longer used for school purposes and is owned by ECI Inc., a developmental center for people with disabilities.

=== Middle schools ===
- Tiffin Middle School (Grades 6th through 8th) 103 Shepherd Drive
- Former middle schools were East and West Junior High. In the beginning students went to the schools based on what side of the Sandusky River they lived on. At that time the schools housed grades 7-9. By the time the schools closed West was used for grades 6-7 and East was used for grade 8 for all Tiffin City School students. Both closed after the construction of Tiffin Middle School which consolidated the two schools into one in 2003. West Junior high has since been demolished (69 West Market Street) and a small part of East Junior high still remains (109 Jefferson Street).

=== High schools ===
- Columbian High School (Grades 9th through 12th)
