= Buckeye Central Local School District =

School district in Ohio

Location
- 938 S. Kibler Street New Washington, Ohio, Crawford County; United States

District information
- Motto: Where students come first
- Grades: PK-12
- Established: 1960
- Superintendent: Barb Green
- Schools: 3
- Budget: 16 million

Students and staff
- Students: 644
- Student–teacher ratio: 12.60

Other information
- Website: www.buckeye-central.org

Buckeye Central Local School District is a public school district serving students in Crawford, Seneca, Huron, and Richland counties located in New Washington, Ohio. The school district enrolls students pre-kindergarten through 12th grade with 644 students as of the 2024-2025 school year.

== History ==
The Buckeye Central Local School District was formed in 1960 as a result of the consolidation of the New Washington, Chatfield, and Tiro school districts. The districts merged due to schools in the area failing to employ enough teachers or offer enough subjects.

== Schools ==
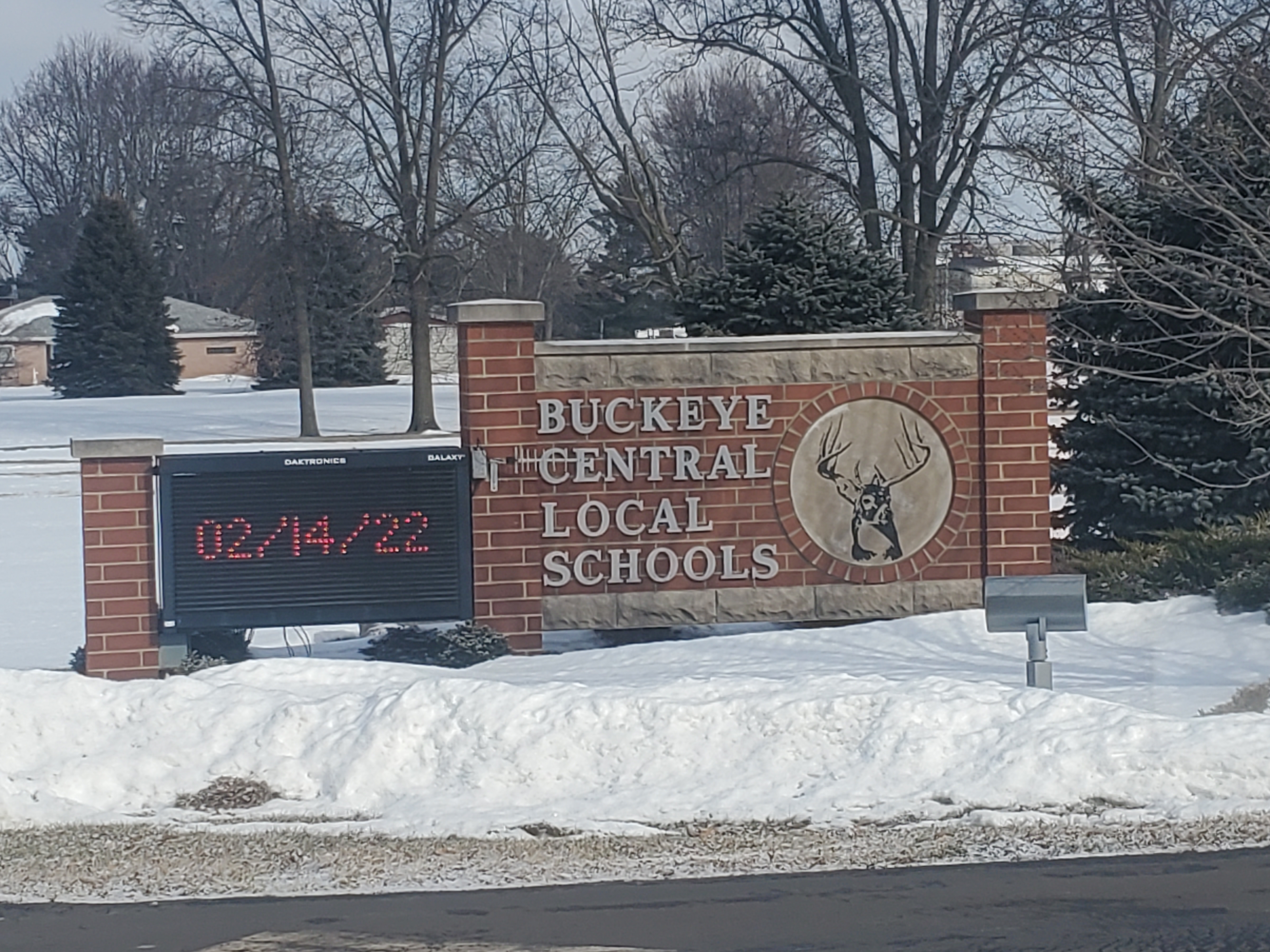
Buckeye Central High School in New Washington, Ohio.

=== Elementary schools ===
- Buckeye Central Elementary School (PreK through 4)

=== Middle schools ===
- Buckeye Central Middle School (5 through 8)

=== High schools ===
- Buckeye Central High School (9 through 12)
