= Buckeye Local School District (Ashtabula County) =

School district in Ohio

Address
- 3436 Edgewood Dr Ashtabula, Ohio, 44004; United States

District information
- Grades: K - 12
- Superintendent: Patrick Colucci
- NCES District ID: 3904585

Students and staff
- Enrollment: 1,634 (2024-25)
- Faculty: 91.01 (FTE)
- Student–teacher ratio: 17.95

Other information
- Website: www.buckeyeschools.info

The Buckeye Local School District is a public school district in Ashtabula County, Ohio, United States. The school district serves one high school, one middle school and two elementary schools

== Schools ==
Schools within the district consist of

=== High school ===
- Edgewood Senior High School

=== Middle school ===
- Braden Middle School

=== Elementary schools ===
- Kingsville Elementary Schools
- Ridgeview Elementary Schools
