= Forest, Ohio =

- Village
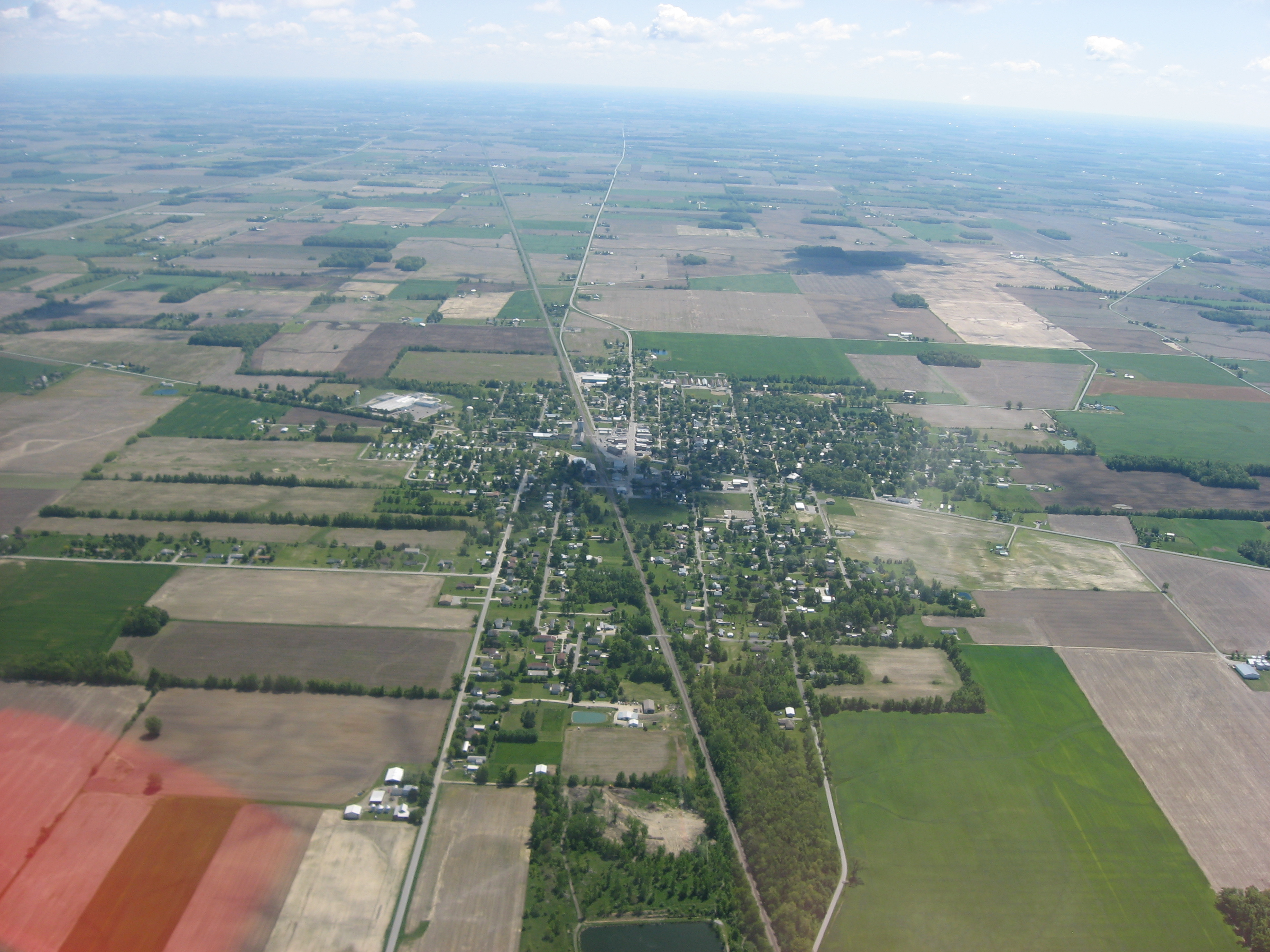
- Aerial view of Forest

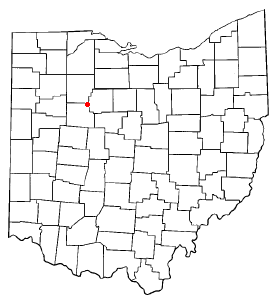
- Location of Forest, Ohio

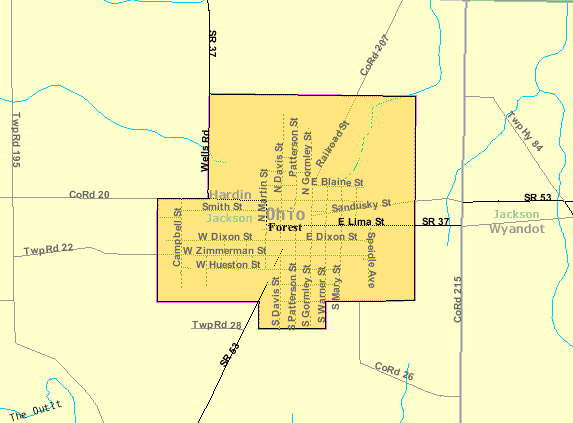
- Detailed map of Forest
- Coordinates: 40°48′18″N 83°30′42″W
- Country: United States
- State: Ohio
- Counties: Hardin, Wyandot

Area
  - Total: 1.44 sq mi (3.74 km^{2})
  - Land: 1.44 sq mi (3.74 km^{2})
  - Water: 0 sq mi (0.00 km^{2})
- Elevation: 929 ft (283 m)

Population (2020)
  - Total: 1,350
  - Estimate (2023): 1,331
  - Density: 934.9/sq mi (360.97/km^{2})
- Time zone: UTC-5 (Eastern (EST))
  - Summer (DST): UTC-4 (EDT)
- ZIP code: 45843
- Area code: 419
- FIPS code: 39-27636
- GNIS feature ID: 2398894
- Website: www.villageofforest.com

Forest is a village in Hardin and Wyandot counties in the U.S. state of Ohio. The population was 1,350 at the 2020 census.

== History ==
A post office has been in operation at Forest since 1854. Forest was platted in 1855 when the railroad was extended to that point. The village most likely was named for the fact the original town site was a forest. Forest was incorporated in 1865.

Forest was directly in the path of totality during the solar eclipse of April 8, 2024, for almost four minutes, making it one of sites with longest duration of totality.

== Geography ==
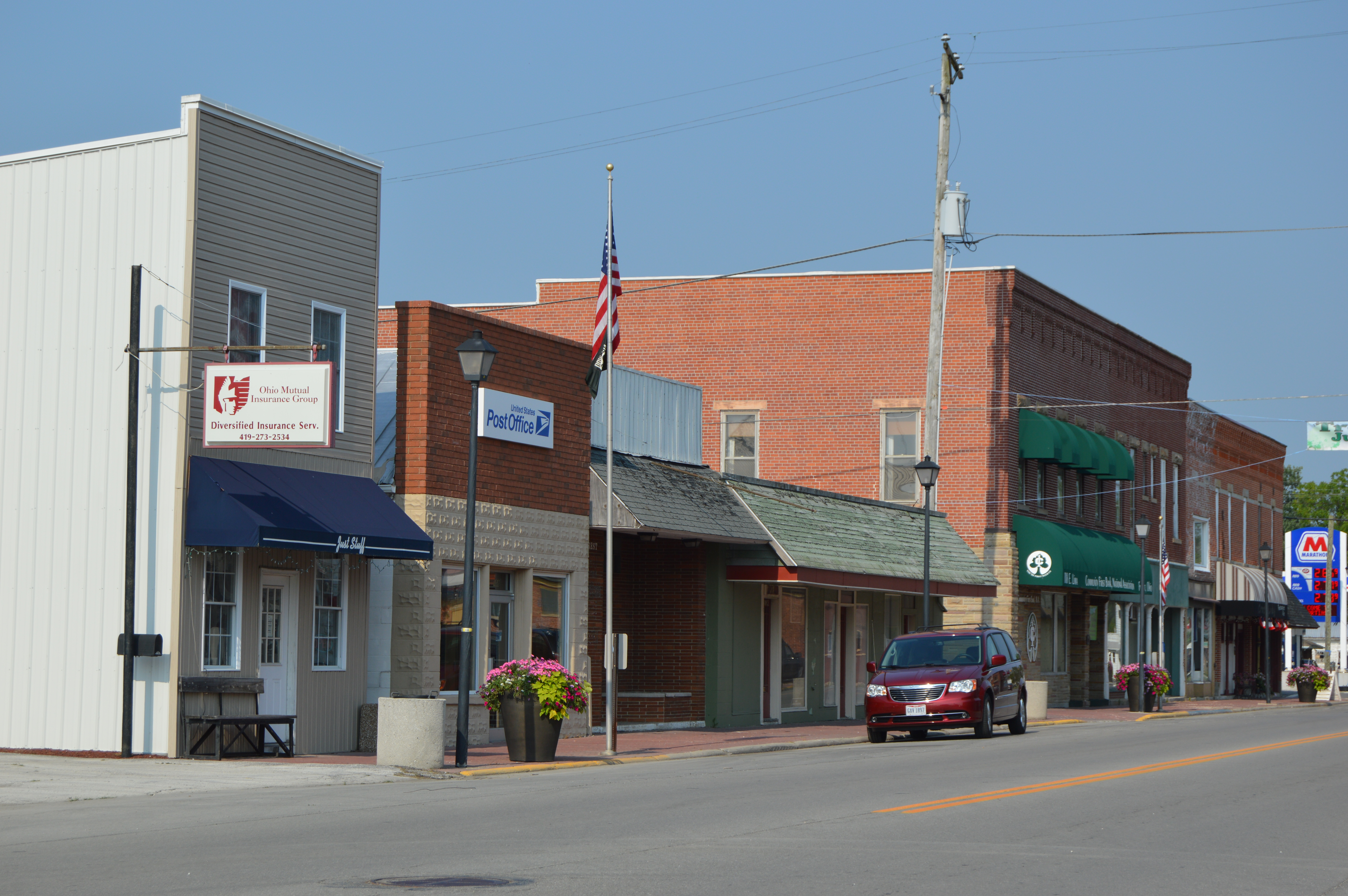
Lima Street downtown

According to the United States Census Bureau, the village has a total area of 1.61 square miles (4.17 km^{2}), all land.

== Demographics ==
Historical population
Census	Pop.	Note	%±
1880	987		—
1890	1,126		14.1%
1900	1,155		2.6%
1910	1,285		11.3%
1920	1,143		−11.1%
1930	1,103		−3.5%
1940	1,083		−1.8%
1950	1,114		2.9%
1960	1,314		18.0%
1970	1,535		16.8%
1980	1,633		6.4%
1990	1,594		−2.4%
2000	1,488		−6.6%
2010	1,461		−1.8%
2020	1,350		−7.6%
2023 (est.)	1,331	▼	−1.4%
U.S. Decennial Census

=== 2010 census ===
As of the census of 2010, there were 1,461 people, 550 households, and 387 families living in the village. The population density was 907.5 inhabitants per square mile (350.4/km^{2}). There were 646 housing units at an average density of 401.2 per square mile (154.9/km^{2}). The racial makeup of the village was 98.0% White, 0.4% African American, 0.1% Native American, 0.1% from other races, and 1.4% from two or more races. Hispanic or Latino of any race were 1.0% of the population.

There were 550 households, of which 39.1% had children under the age of 18 living with them, 53.6% were married couples living together, 12.4% had a female householder with no husband present, 4.4% had a male householder with no wife present, and 29.6% were non-families. 24.7% of all households were made up of individuals, and 9.8% had someone living alone who was 65 years of age or older. The average household size was 2.66 and the average family size was 3.11.

The median age in the village was 34.2 years. 29.4% of residents were under the age of 18; 7.8% were between the ages of 18 and 24; 27.1% were from 25 to 44; 23.8% were from 45 to 64; and 11.9% were 65 years of age or older. The gender makeup of the village was 50.5% male and 49.5% female.

=== 2000 census ===
As of the census of 2000, there were 1,488 people, 591 households, and 410 families living in the village. The population density was 1,253.4 inhabitants per square mile (483.9/km^{2}). There were 644 housing units at an average density of 542.5 per square mile (209.5/km^{2}). The racial makeup of the village was 98.52% White, 0.40% African American, 0.07% Native American, 0.34% from other races, and 0.67% from two or more races. Hispanic or Latino of any race were 0.81% of the population.

There were 591 households, out of which 35.0% had children under the age of 18 living with them, 53.1% were married couples living together, 11.8% had a female householder with no husband present, and 30.5% were non-families. 26.7% of all households were made up of individuals, and 9.8% had someone living alone who was 65 years of age or older. The average household size was 2.52 and the average family size was 3.04.

In the village, the population was spread out, with 28.5% under the age of 18, 10.7% from 18 to 24, 29.2% from 25 to 44, 19.8% from 45 to 64, and 11.8% who were 65 years of age or older. The median age was 32 years. For every 100 females there were 95.0 males. For every 100 females age 18 and over, there were 92.1 males.

The median income for a household in the village was $34,375, and the median income for a family was $38,631. Males had a median income of $31,071 versus $22,260 for females. The per capita income for the village was $15,342. About 8.1% of families and 9.7% of the population were below the poverty line, including 11.7% of those under age 18 and 8.6% of those age 65 or over.

== Notable people ==
- Jim Karcher, American football player.
