= Berlin Center, Ohio =

- Unincorporated community
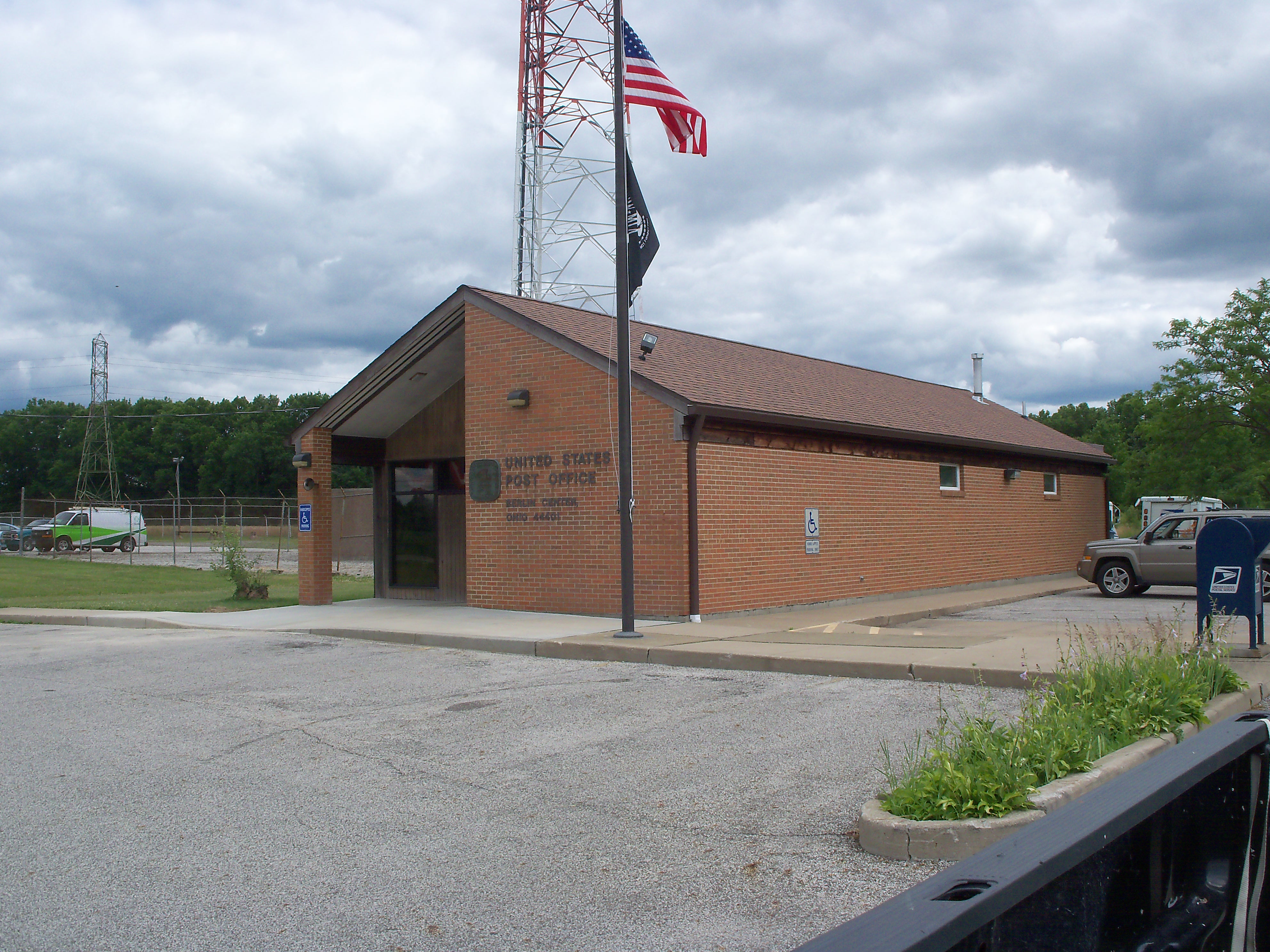
- Berlin Center Post Office

- Location within Ohio Location within the United States
- Coordinates: 41°01′28″N 80°56′51″W
- Country: United States
- State: Ohio
- County: Mahoning
- Township: Berlin
- Elevation: 1,073 ft (327 m)
- Time zone: UTC-5 (Eastern (EST))
  - Summer (DST): UTC-4 (EDT)
- ZIP code: 44401
- GNIS feature ID: 1056221

Berlin Center (/ˈbɜːrlɪn/ BUR-lin) is an unincorporated community in central Berlin Township, Mahoning County, Ohio, United States. It lies east of the Berlin Lake reservoir.

== History ==
A post office called Berlin Centre was established in 1833, and the name was changed to Berlin Center in 1893. The community takes its name from Berlin Township. In 1907, Berlin Center had about 60 inhabitants.

== Notable residents ==
- Ming of Harlem – tiger who resided at Noah's Lost Ark Animal Sanctuary after being found in a Harlem apartment
