= Deerfield Township, Portage County, Ohio =

Township in Ohio, US

- Civil township
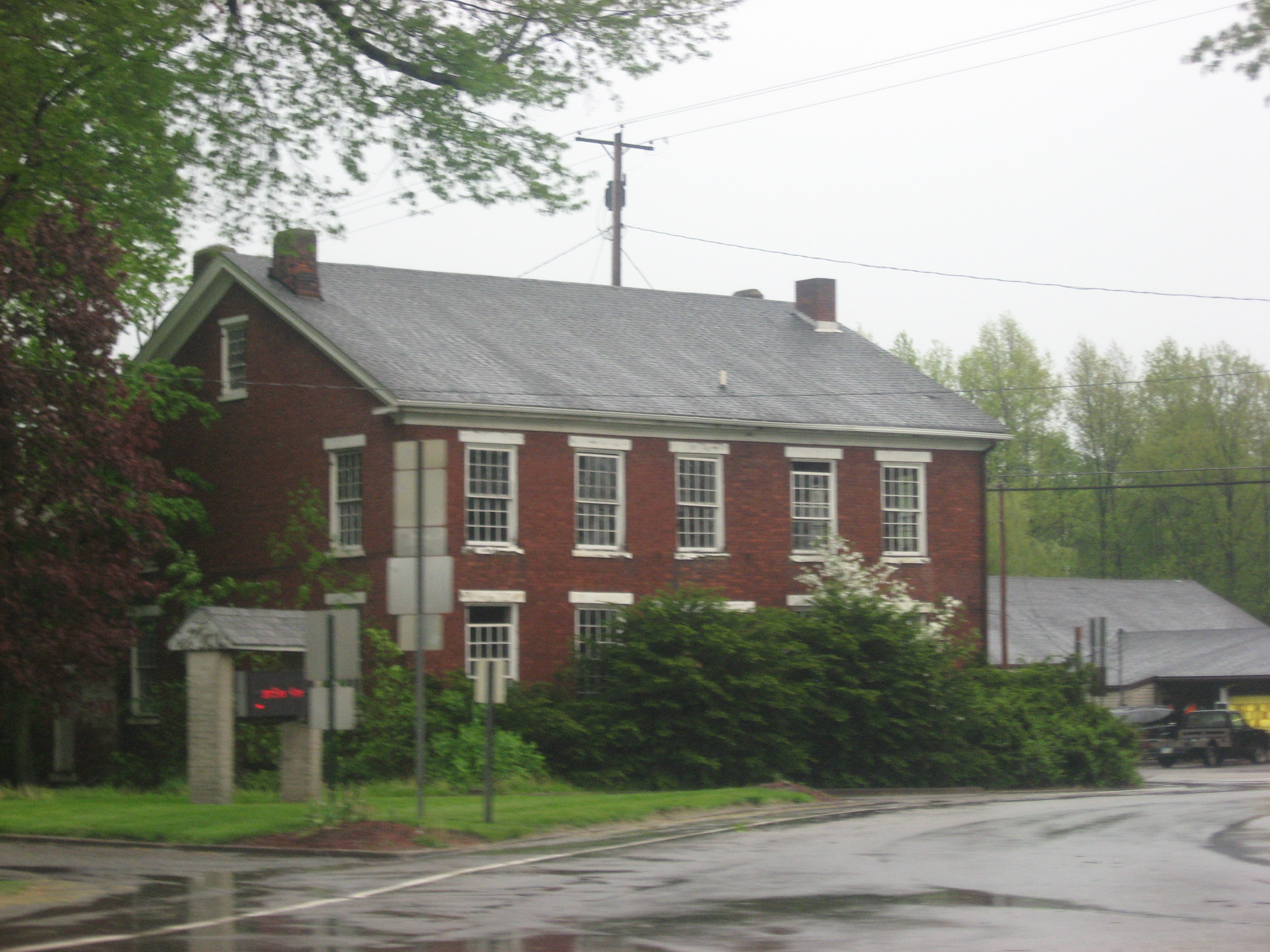
- The John Diver House at Deerfield Center
- Interactive map of Deerfield Township, Portage County, Ohio
- Coordinates: 41°1′11″N 81°2′30″W
- Country: United States
- State: Ohio
- County: Portage
- Established: 1806

Government
  - Type: Civil township

Area
  - Total: 26.4 sq mi (68.5 km^{2})
  - Land: 22.7 sq mi (58.9 km^{2})
  - Water: 3.7 sq mi (9.6 km^{2})
- Elevation: 1,050 ft (320 m)

Population (2020)
  - Total: 2,838
  - Density: 107.1/sq mi (41.4/km^{2})
- Time zone: UTC-5 (Eastern (EST))
  - Summer (DST): UTC-4 (EDT)
- ZIP code: 44411
- Area codes: 330, 234
- FIPS code: 39-21210
- GNIS feature ID: 1086825
- Website: https://www.deerfieldtwpportage.com/

Deerfield Township is one of the eighteen townships of Portage County, Ohio, United States. The 2020 census found 2,838 people in the township.

== Geography ==
Located in the southeastern corner of the county, it borders the following townships:

- Palmyra Township - north
- Milton Township, Mahoning County - northeast corner
- Berlin Township, Mahoning County - east
- Smith Township, Mahoning County - south
- Lexington Township, Stark County - southwest
- Atwater Township - west
- Edinburg Township - northwest corner

No municipalities are located in Deerfield Township.

Formed from the Connecticut Western Reserve, Deerfield Township covers an area of 25 sq mi (65 km^{2}).

== Name and history ==
Deerfield Township was organized in 1806 and takes its name from Deerfield, Massachusetts, the native home of a first settler. Statewide, other Deerfield Townships are located in Morgan, Ross, and Warren counties.

== Government ==
The township is governed by a three-member board of trustees, who are elected in November of odd-numbered years to a four-year term beginning on the following January 1. Two are elected in the year after the presidential election and one is elected in the year before it. There is also an elected township fiscal officer, who serves a four-year term beginning on April 1 of the year after the election, which is held in November of the year before the presidential election. Vacancies in the fiscal officership or on the board of trustees are filled by the remaining trustees.

From 2013 until 2018, the Portage County District Library operated the Deerfield Computer Lab at the Deerfield Township Hall.
