= Mount Blanchard, Ohio =

- Village
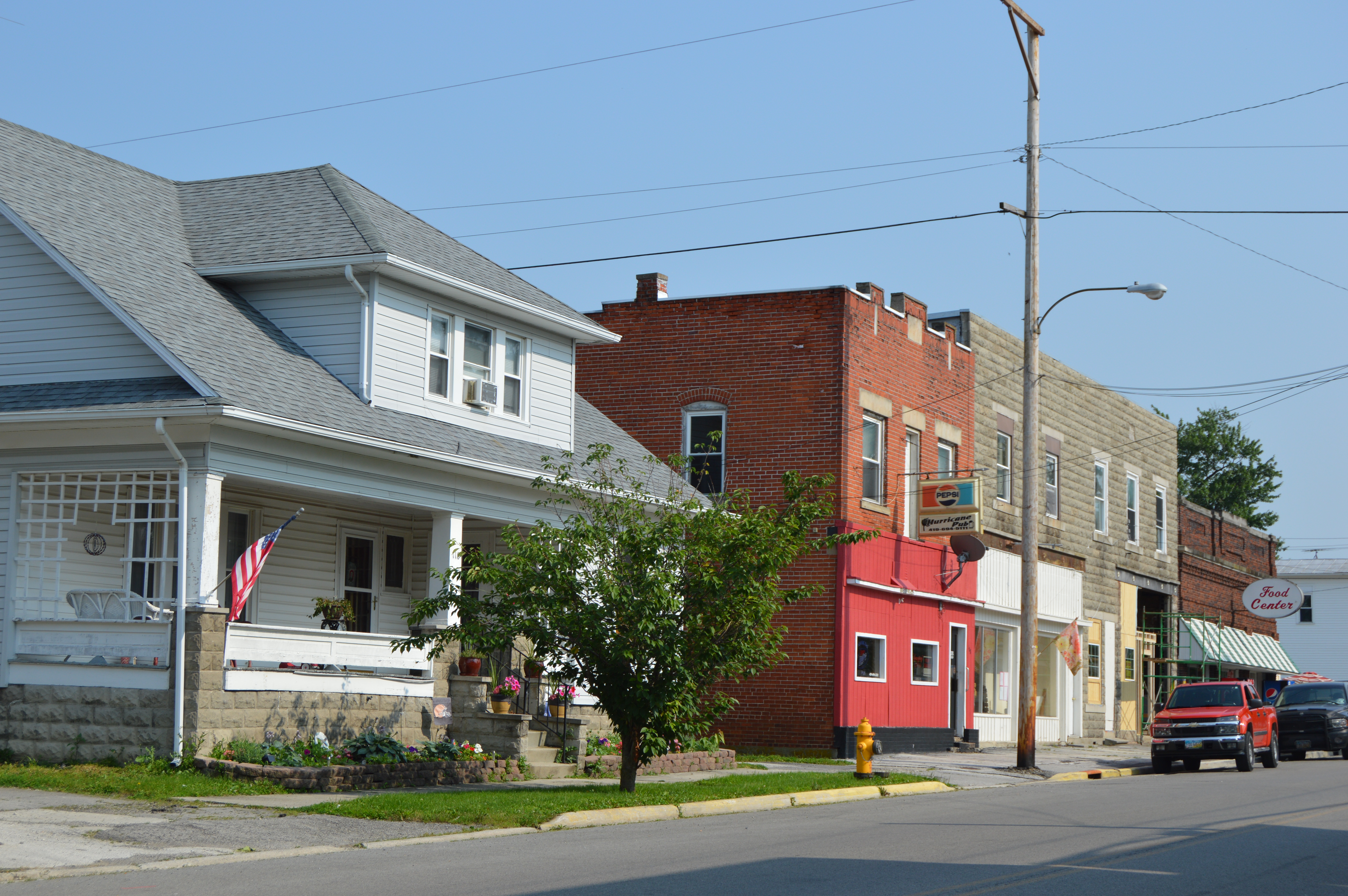
- Main Street

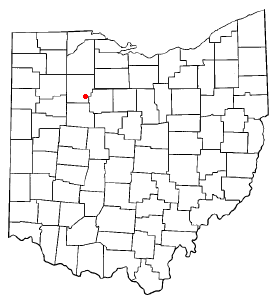
- Location of Mount Blanchard, Ohio

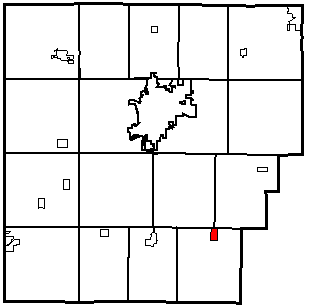
- Location within Hancock County
- Coordinates: 40°53′55″N 83°33′24″W
- Country: United States
- State: Ohio
- County: Hancock
- Established: 1830

Government
  - Type: Village Council

Area
  - Total: 0.51 sq mi (1.32 km^{2})
  - Land: 0.51 sq mi (1.32 km^{2})
  - Water: 0 sq mi (0.00 km^{2})
- Elevation: 843 ft (257 m)

Population (2020)
  - Total: 471
  - Density: 923.0/sq mi (356.38/km^{2})
- Time zone: UTC-5 (Eastern (EST))
  - Summer (DST): UTC-4 (EDT)
- ZIP code: 45867
- Area code: 419
- FIPS code: 39-52598
- GNIS feature ID: 2399407
- Website: https://mtblanchardoh.com/villagesite/

Mount Blanchard is a village in Hancock County, Ohio, United States. The population was 471 at the 2020 census.

== History ==
Mount Blanchard was platted in 1830, and so named for its lofty elevation over the Blanchard River valley. A post office called Mount Blanchard has been in operation since 1837. The village was incorporated in 1865.

== Geography ==
According to the United States Census Bureau, the village has a total area of 0.54 square miles (1.40 km^{2}), all land.

== Demographics ==
Historical population
Census	Pop.	Note	%±
1880	285		—
1890	421		47.7%
1900	456		8.3%
1910	497		9.0%
1920	427		−14.1%
1930	401		−6.1%
1940	442		10.2%
1950	444		0.5%
1960	432		−2.7%
1970	473		9.5%
1980	492		4.0%
1990	491		−0.2%
2000	484		−1.4%
2010	492		1.7%
2020	471		−4.3%
U.S. Decennial Census

=== 2010 census ===
As of the census of 2010, there were 492 people, 183 households, and 134 families living in the village. The population density was 911.1 inhabitants per square mile (351.8/km^{2}). There were 209 housing units at an average density of 387.0 per square mile (149.4/km^{2}). The racial makeup of the village was 96.5% White, 0.4% African American, 0.4% Pacific Islander, 1.0% from other races, and 1.6% from two or more races. Hispanic or Latino of any race were 2.6% of the population.

There were 183 households, of which 39.9% had children under the age of 18 living with them, 53.0% were married couples living together, 11.5% had a female householder with no husband present, 8.7% had a male householder with no wife present, and 26.8% were non-families. 23.5% of all households were made up of individuals, and 9.8% had someone living alone who was 65 years of age or older. The average household size was 2.69 and the average family size was 3.12.

The median age in the village was 34.3 years. 30.7% of residents were under the age of 18; 6.7% were between the ages of 18 and 24; 26.2% were from 25 to 44; 22.6% were from 45 to 64; and 13.8% were 65 years of age or older. The gender makeup of the village was 49.4% male and 50.6% female.

=== 2000 census ===
As of the census of 2000, there were 484 people, 192 households, and 134 families living in the village. The population density was 895.8 inhabitants per square mile (345.9/km^{2}). There were 204 housing units at an average density of 377.5 per square mile (145.8/km^{2}). The racial makeup of the village was 98.14% White, 0.21% African American, 0.83% from other races, and 0.83% from two or more races. Hispanic or Latino of any race were 1.24% of the population.

There were 192 households, out of which 36.5% had children under the age of 18 living with them, 55.2% were married couples living together, 10.4% had a female householder with no husband present, and 30.2% were non-families. 25.0% of all households were made up of individuals, and 10.4% had someone living alone who was 65 years of age or older. The average household size was 2.52 and the average family size was 2.99.

In the village, the population was spread out, with 28.3% under the age of 18, 7.2% from 18 to 24, 30.0% from 25 to 44, 21.7% from 45 to 64, and 12.8% who were 65 years of age or older. The median age was 35 years. For every 100 females there were 93.6 males. For every 100 females age 18 and over, there were 88.6 males.

The median income for a household in the village was $38,929, and the median income for a family was $45,000. Males had a median income of $34,250 versus $25,500 for females. The per capita income for the village was $16,410. About 2.3% of families and 4.8% of the population were below the poverty line, including none of those under age 18 and 9.9% of those age 65 or over.
