= Grantland Gardens, Washington Township =

Grantland Gardens
- Neighborhood
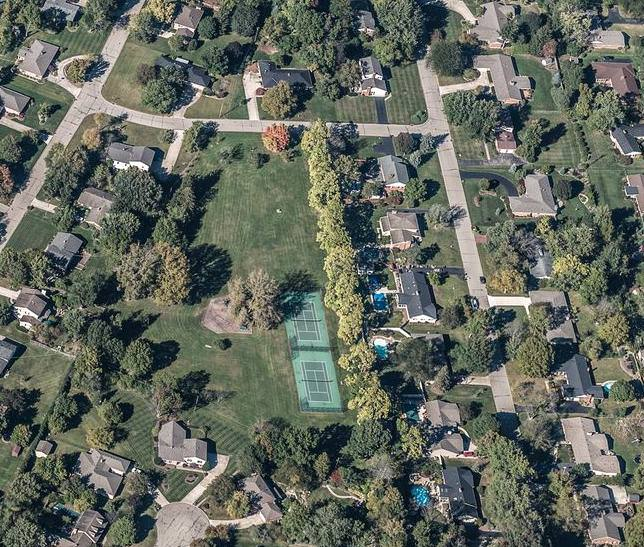
- Aerial view of Old Lane Park in Grantland Gardens
- Interactive map of Grantland Gardens
- Coordinates: 39°39′49.83″N 84°10′47.22″W
- Country: United States
- State: Ohio
- County: Montgomery
- Township: Washington

Area
  - Total: 0.92 sq mi (2.39 km^{2})
- Time zone: UTC-5 (Eastern (EST))
  - Summer (DST): UTC-4 (EDT)

Grantland Gardens is a neighborhood located in Washington Township in Montgomery County, Ohio, United States at 39°39′49.83″N 84°10′47.22″W (39.663841,-84.1797829). The name originates from the legal description for land parcels in the area.

== Description and history ==
The Grantland Gardens neighborhood encompasses the area south of Kettering to West Whipp Road from between Mad River Road to the West and State Route 48 to the East. The neighborhood is largely residential and contains three parks part of the Centerville-Washington Township Park District. Grantland Gardens was developed largely in the mid 1950s to 1960s when establishment and growth of Wright-Patterson Air Force Base increased residential demand.

=== Parks ===
==== Old Lane Park ====
Old Lane Park was one of the four initial parks of the Centerville-Washington Township Park District. Due to the growing number of homes, guidelines set in place by the park district required creation of parks and playgrounds. The original site was debated by residents with concerns about it disrupting the peaceful community, and as a result a new site was located and purchased in 1966 that is lined by trees to serve as a buffer. The name comes from a farm lane on the property back in the 1800s.

==== Rahn Park ====
The property for Rahn Park was donated to the Centerville-Washington Township Park District in 1964, helping the park district maintain their goal of having enough green space with the number of homes in the area.

==== Woodbourne Green Park ====
Owned by Montgomery County until 1989 when ownership transferred to the Centerville-Washington Township Park District, this triangular shaped parcel contains a historical marker recognizing the Village of Woodbourne that was settled in 1797 in this location. The Woodbourne cemetery, located next to the park across Paddington Road also features a historical marker placed by the Centerville Historical Society telling a story of how a nearby resident stole many of the gravestones in order to create a patio in their back yard.
