= Centerville, Ohio =

- City
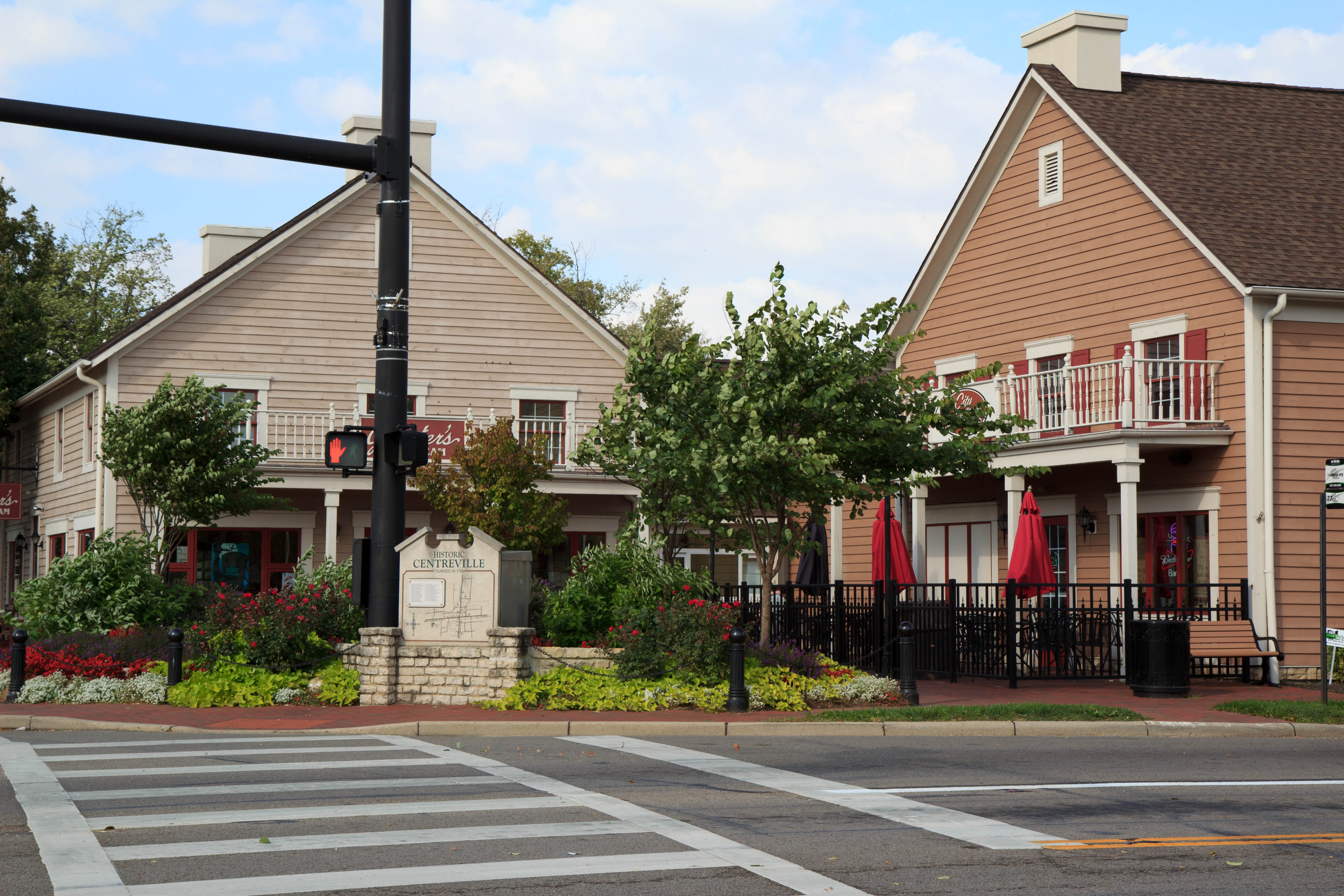
- Centerville Historic District

- Flag Seal
- Motto: "Progress, Stability"
- Interactive map of Centerville, Ohio
- Location within Ohio Location within the United States
- Coordinates: 39°37′20″N 84°07′20″W
- Country: United States
- State: Ohio
- County: Montgomery
- Founded: 1796
- Incorporated: 1968

Government
  - Mayor: Brooks Compton

Area
  - Total: 11.03 sq mi (28.58 km^{2})
  - Land: 10.98 sq mi (28.43 km^{2})
  - Water: 0.058 sq mi (0.15 km^{2})
- Elevation: 974 ft (297 m)

Population (2020)
  - Total: 24,240
  - Estimate (2023): 25,754
  - Density: 2,208.6/sq mi (852.75/km^{2})
- Time zone: UTC-5 (Eastern (EST))
  - Summer (DST): UTC-4 (EDT)
- ZIP codes: 45440, 45458-45459
- Area codes: 937, 326
- FIPS code: 39-13190
- GNIS feature ID: 2393783
- Website: The City of Centerville, Ohio

Centerville is a city in Montgomery County, Ohio, United States. A core suburb in Dayton metropolitan area, its population was 24,240 as of the 2020 census.

== History ==
Following the signing of the Treaty of Greenville, which opened the Northwest Territory to settlement, Centerville was first surveyed in February 1796 by Aaron Nutt, Benjamin Archer, and Benjamin Robbins, three brothers-in-law who traveled from New Jersey through Pennsylvania and Kentucky. Their survey of land owned by John Cleves Symmes occurred two months prior to the establishment of Dayton. They each claimed land near the intersection of Main and Franklin Streets. Robbins and two of his brothers chose land in Centerville, with Robbins selecting 160 acres northwest of the town center due to the abundance of springs. Benjamin Robbins named the settlement after his hometown of Centreville, New Jersey, citing its location between two rivers and its proximity to several other communities.

In 1796, Dr. John Hole, a veteran of the American Revolutionary War who served under General Richard Montgomery, arrived in the region. He was the first physician in the area and is credited with naming Montgomery County in honor of the general. Dr. Hole settled northwest of present-day Centerville, in the area that would become Washington Township, where he built a cabin for his family near Holes Creek.

On April 6, 1797, Benjamin Robbins and his family arrived in Centerville from Dry Ridge, Kentucky, after constructing a wagon road over ten days. Robbins built a log cabin for his family, which was later damaged by a storm. His son, Sam Robbins, would later become the first mayor of Centerville.

In 1799, Edmund Munger arrived with his family and advocated for formal education. His seven children attended a neighborhood school constructed from logs sourced from nearby hardwood forests. Attendance at such schools was often irregular, particularly for boys who were needed at home to assist with farm work. By 1825, the Ohio legislature recognized that revenue from the land section allocated in each township for school funding was insufficient to support the state's expanding population. In response, lawmakers authorized a statewide school tax to provide more consistent financial support for education. The implementation of the statewide school tax led to the construction of more durable school buildings. Brick structures replaced earlier log cabin schools, and the number of schools in Washington Township grew to nine, commonly referred to as district schools.

Centerville was officially recognized by the state in 1803, platted in 1805, and incorporated as a town in 1830.

As more families settled in the area, they cleared land to build homes and establish farms. Early settlers initially constructed log houses, which were later replaced by stone homes made from the region's abundant limestone. At one point in the 19th century, nearly 100 stone buildings lined local streets and homesteads, many of which still exist today.

Because slavery was outlawed in the Northwest Territory, slave owners generally did not settle in Centerville. However, southwest Ohio had several escape routes for enslaved individuals fleeing north after crossing the Ohio River. One route from Cincinnati passed through Lebanon, Springboro and Centerville. Another began in Ripley and traveled through Wilmington and Centerville.

Abolitionist activity was present in Centerville and Washington Township, where historical evidence suggests that four safe houses associated with the Underground Railroad existed. In one instance from the late 1820s, a runaway slave was found and sheltered by the Sunderland family on their farm. The slave worked for the Sunderlands until the Kentucky owner was informed of his location by the suitor of one of the Sunderland daughters. When slave hunters arrived at the farm, the runaway managed to escape.

In 1863, schools in Centerville and Washington Township enrolled approximately 550 students. Enrollment remained in the hundreds until 1955, when it surpassed 1,100. By 1960, the number had doubled, and by 1969, enrollment exceeded 6,800 students. That same year, the district was renamed Centerville City Schools. Centerville High School was subsequently moved to its current campus in 1973.

In 1900, the U.S. Post Office changed the spelling of the town's name from "Centreville" to "Centerville."

In 1908, the Town Hall Theatre was constructed and originally served as Washington Township's hall and seat of government. It was used for meetings of township trustees and as a venue for various community activities. The building housed the township government offices until 1985. In 1989, the township repurposed the structure into a performing arts center. Between 1992 and 1996, renovations added an auditorium, lobby, rehearsal space, dance studio, and scene shop. In 2019, a dispute emerged between Centerville and Washington Township over the adjacent open space, with the township advocating to maintain it as green space. Both parties submitted bids for the property, and it was acquired by Centerville. In 2023, the Centerville Noon Optimist Club donated US$20,000 to the Town Hall Theatre to support renovations that included new seating and improvements to comfort and acoustics.

On December 2, 1968, Centerville became a city.

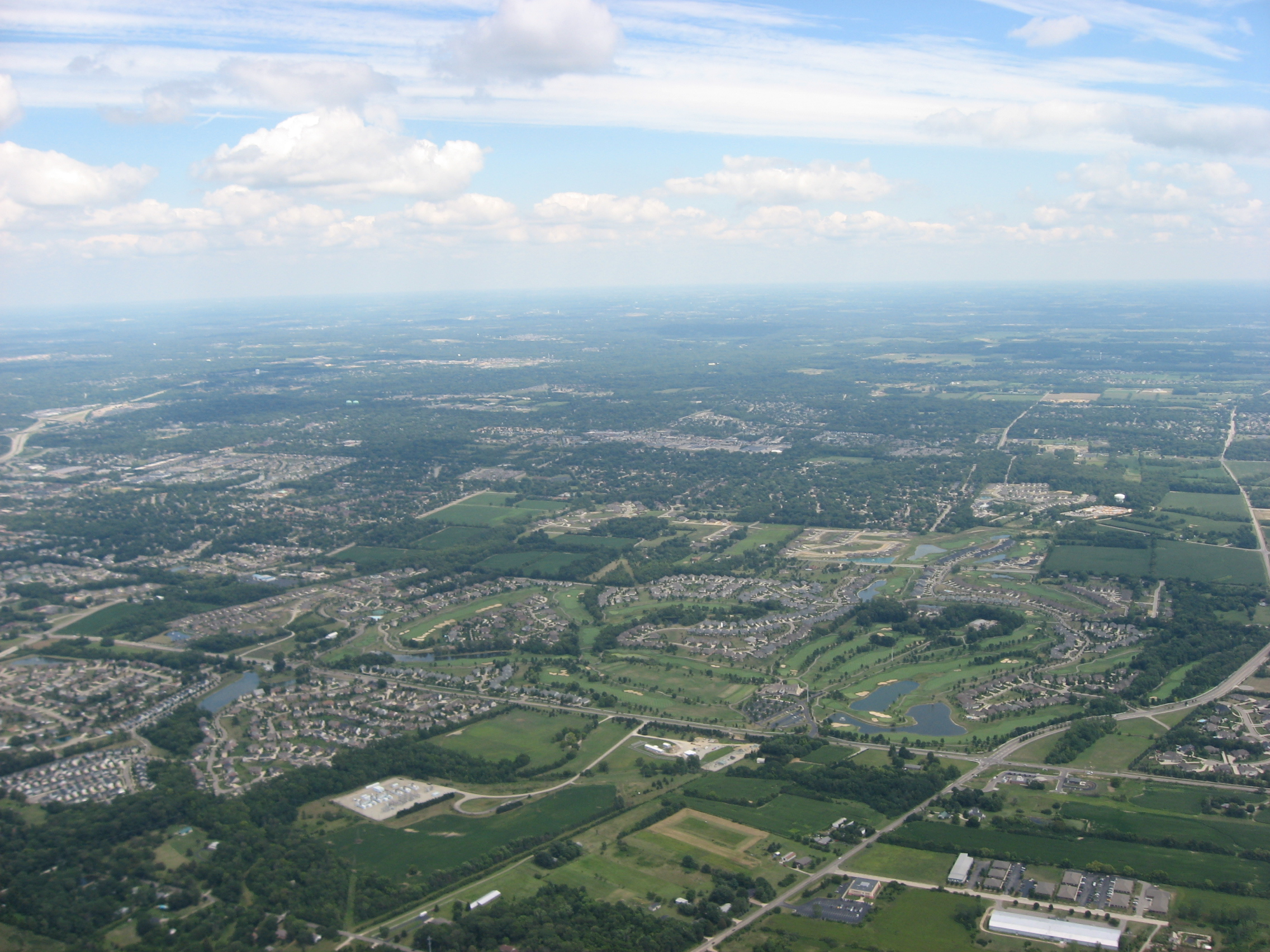
Aerial view of Centerville and Washington Township in August 2008

Miami Valley Hospital South opened in Centerville in 2007 as an outpatient facility with an emergency department. Due to the city's population growth, the facility was expanded into a full-service hospital by 2013, which included a five-story patient wing and multiple specialty care services including oncology, cardiology, sports medicine, and maternity care. The original facility, completed in October 2007, covered 268,000 square feet (24,900 m^{2}) and cost approximately US$79.5 million to build. It included a general surgery emergency department with 10 operating rooms and employed around 200 staff, many trained at Miami Valley Hospital. By 2013, the hospital had expanded to a 579,000-square-foot (53,800 m^{2}) complex with 60 beds, located on a 115-acre (47 ha) campus adjacent to Interstate 675.

Centerville and Washington Township voted November 5, 2008, on whether to create a merger commission. The proposed merger commission succeeded in the city but failed in the township.

In 2018, Centerville celebrated its 50th anniversary as a municipal corporation.

== Geography ==
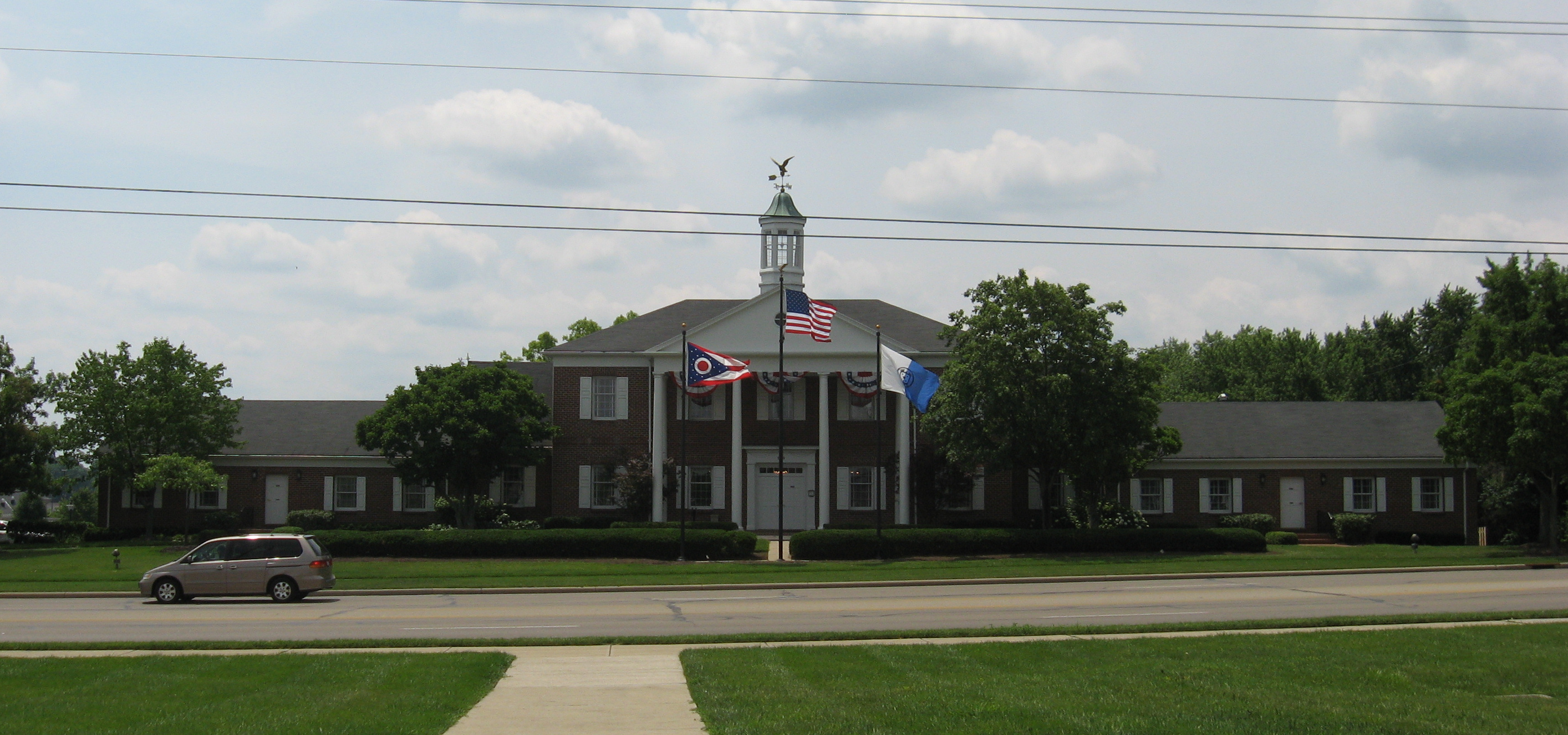
Centerville Municipal Building

Although the city is located primarily in Montgomery County, a small portion is located in Greene County.

According to the United States Census Bureau, the city has a total area of 10.85 square miles (28.10 km^{2}), of which 10.78 square miles (27.92 km^{2}) is land and 0.07 square miles (0.18 km^{2}) is water.

=== Climate ===
According to the Köppen climate classification system, Centerville has a humid continental climate (Dfa). Summers are typically hot and humid, while winters are cold and dry. Due to its location in the Midwestern United States, Centerville is susceptible to severe weather events, including tornadoes from spring to fall. Floods, blizzards, and severe thunderstorms also occur.

== Demographics ==
Historical population
Census	Pop.	Note	%±
1880	274		—
1890	252		−8.0%
1900	290		15.1%
1910	353		21.7%
1920	335		−5.1%
1930	400		19.4%
1940	561		40.3%
1950	827		47.4%
1960	3,490		322.0%
1970	10,333		196.1%
1980	18,886		82.8%
1990	21,082		11.6%
2000	23,024		9.2%
2010	23,999		4.2%
2020	24,240		1.0%
2025 (est.)	25,194		3.9%

=== 2020 census ===
As of the 2020 census, Centerville had a population of 24,240. The median age was 48.8 years. 18.3% of residents were under the age of 18 and 29.5% of residents were 65 years of age or older. For every 100 females there were 86.2 males, and for every 100 females age 18 and over there were 83.6 males age 18 and over.

As of the 2020 census, 100.0% of residents lived in urban areas, while 0% lived in rural areas.

As of the 2020 census, there were 10,970 households in Centerville, of which 22.8% had children under the age of 18 living in them. Of all households, 47.7% were married-couple households, 15.8% were households with a male householder and no spouse or partner present, and 31.4% were households with a female householder and no spouse or partner present. About 35.0% of all households were made up of individuals and 19.2% had someone living alone who was 65 years of age or older.

As of the 2020 census, there were 11,675 housing units, of which 6.0% were vacant. Among occupied housing units, 70.4% were owner-occupied and 29.6% were renter-occupied. The homeowner vacancy rate was 1.0% and the rental vacancy rate was 9.2%.

Racial composition as of the 2020 census
Race	Number	Percent
White	20,054	82.7%
Black or African American	1,408	5.8%
American Indian and Alaska Native	39	0.2%
Asian	909	3.8%
Native Hawaiian and Other Pacific Islander	3	<0.1%
Some other race	215	0.9%
Two or more races	1,612	6.7%
Hispanic or Latino (of any race)	1,006	4.2%

=== 2010 census ===
As of the census of 2010, there were 23,999 people, 10,693 households, and 6,694 families living in the city. The population density was 2,226.3 inhabitants per square mile (859.6/km^{2}). There were 11,421 housing units at an average density of 1,059.5 per square mile (409.1/km^{2}). The racial makeup of the city was 90.2% White, 4.0% African American, 0.2% Native American, 3.2% Asian, 0.4% from other races, and 1.9% from two or more races. Hispanic or Latino of any race were 1.8% of the population.

There were 10,693 households, of which 25.0% had children under the age of 18 living with them, 50.3% were married couples living together, 9.4% had a female householder with no husband present, 2.9% had a male householder with no wife present, and 37.4% were non-families. 32.6% of all households were made up of individuals, and 16.4% had someone living alone who was 65 years of age or older. The average household size was 2.19 and the average family size was 2.78.

The median age in the city was 46.9 years. 20.1% of residents were under the age of 18; 6.4% were between the ages of 18 and 24; 20.8% were from 25 to 44; 28.4% were from 45 to 64; and 24.4% were 65 years of age or older. The gender makeup of the city was 46.2% male and 53.8% female.

=== 2000 census ===
As of the census of 2000, there were 23,024 people, 9,996 households, and 6,597 families living in the city. The population density was 2,257.2 inhabitants per square mile (871.5/km^{2}). There were 10,422 housing units at an average density of 1,021.7 per square mile (394.5/km^{2}). The racial makeup of the city was 92.33% White, 2.94% African American, 0.13% Native American, 3.17% Asian, 0.06% Pacific Islander, 0.26% from other races, and 1.10% from two or more races. Hispanic or Latino of any race were 1.18% of the population.

There were 9,996 households, out of which 26.5% had children under the age of 18 living with them, 56.0% were married couples living together, 7.9% had a female householder with no husband present, and 34.0% were non-families. 30.0% of all households were made up of individuals, and 11.8% had someone living alone who was 65 years of age or older. The average household size was 2.26 and the average family size was 2.82.

In the city the population was spread out, with 21.6% under the age of 18, 6.2% from 18 to 24, 25.8% from 25 to 44, 27.5% from 45 to 64, and 18.9% who were 65 years of age or older. The median age was 43 years. For every 100 females, there were 86.7 males. For every 100 females age 18 and over, there were 83.3 males.

The median income for a household in the city was $54,892, and the median income for a family was $68,580. Males had a median income of $52,331 versus $34,881 for females. The per capita income for the city was $30,210. About 3.4% of families and 4.1% of the population were below the poverty line, including 6.4% of those under age 18 and 3.6% of those age 65 or over.

== Economy ==
Centerville has a median household income of US$81,500 and a per capita income of US$50,770, both above the state and national averages. The city's unemployment rate is 5.5%, slightly below the national average. Centerville has a municipal property tax rate of US$2.35 per US$1,000 of assessed valuation, placing it among the lowest rates in Montgomery County. The city's poverty rate was 8.9%, lower than the Ohio state average of 13.2%. Centerville imposes an income tax rate of 5.2%, which is higher than the national average of 4.6%. The city's sales tax rate is 7.3%, aligning with the national average.

Miami Valley Hospital South employs approximately 1,820 people, making it the largest employer in Centerville. The Centerville City School District has a workforce of about 1,640. The city includes around 1,161 businesses across multiple sectors. Retail trade is the largest employment category, with about 2,305 workers, followed by health care with approximately 2,137 and professional, scientific, and technical services with around 1,549.

== Arts and culture ==
Centerville has the largest collection of early stone houses in the state of Ohio. Many are listed in the National Register of Historic Places.

The Town Hall Theatre is located in downtown Centerville.

The Heart of Centerville features a selection of boutiques, restaurants and businesses in a historic setting which includes Ohio's largest collection of early stone buildings.

== Government ==
Centerville has a city manager government with a seven-member city council elected at-large for four-year terms. The mayor, selected from among the council members, serves as the presiding officer. The council provides legislative direction, while the city manager oversees daily administrative operations in accordance with the council's recommendations.

== Education ==
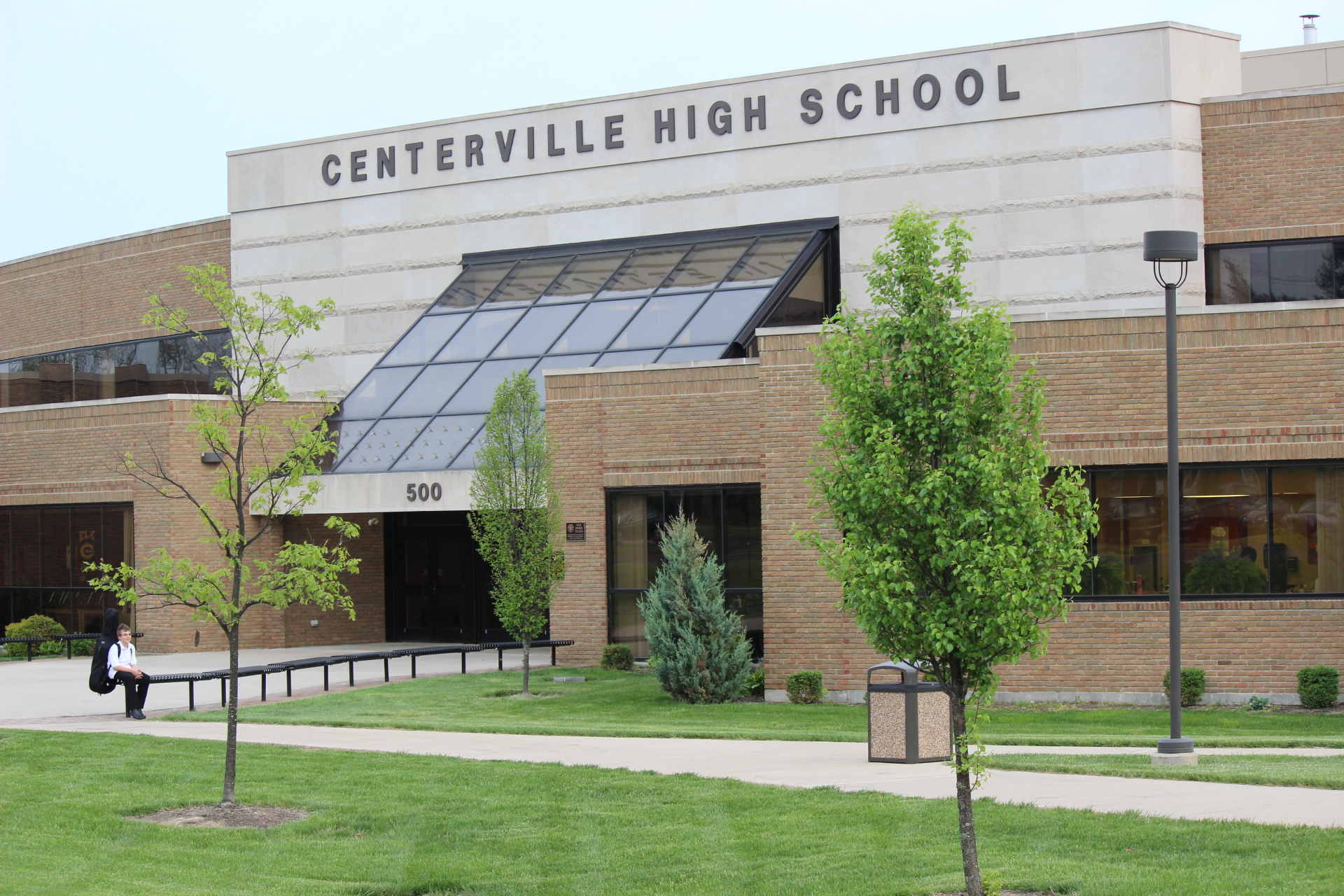
Main entrance of Centerville High School, May 2014

Centerville Public Schools are part of the Centerville City School District. The district has a preschool which is located in each of the two elementary schools teaching kindergarten to first grade. The district also has six elementary schools teaching second through fifth grade, three middle schools teaching sixth through eight grade, as well as one high school and an alternative high school.

The other public schools in this district include:

- Centerville Primary Village North (1970)
- Centerville Primary Village South (2007)
- Normandy Elementary School (1964)
- Stingley Elementary School (1962)
- Driscoll Elementary School (1962)
- Weller Elementary (1959)
- W.O. Cline Elementary School (1955)
- John Hole Elementary School (1956)
- C.W. Magsig Middle School (1924)
- Hadley E. Watts Middle School (1969)
- Tower Heights Middle School (1967)
- Centerville School of Possibilities (1961)
- Centerville High School (1973)

There is also one Catholic K-8 School and a Seventh-day Adventist Pre-12 Preparatory School serving the city.

Washington-Centerville Public Library offers residents access to more than 380,000 books, audios, movies, and music as well as educational programs, community services, and research assistance for youth and adults.

== Notable people ==
- Hannah Beachler, Academy Award winner for production design
- Michael Bennett, NFL defensive tackle for the Jacksonville Jaguars
- Erma Bombeck, essayist
- Stevie Brock, singer
- Phil Donahue, talk show host
- Nancy Dutiel, fashion and beauty model (Lancôme)
- Claire Falknor, professional soccer player for the Houston Dash
- Eric Fanning, was appointed 22nd Secretary of the Army by President Obama on May 18, 2016
- Andy Harmon, former Philadelphia Eagles player
- A. J. Hawk, former NFL linebacker for the Green Bay Packers, Atlanta Falcons, and Cincinnati Bengals
- Kirk Herbstreit, played quarterback at Ohio State before becoming a sports analyst on the ESPN program College Gameday
- Will Johnson, NFL fullback
- Ben Judd, video game agent and producer
- Pat Kilbane, comic actor, singer
- Nate Leaman, American ice hockey coach
- Holley Mangold, Olympic weightlifter and female football player
- Nick Mangold, former offensive lineman for the New York Jets
- Sean Murphy, baseball catcher for the Atlanta Braves
- Mike Nugent, played football for Ohio State University, and the New York Jets and Cincinnati Bengals of the National Football League
- Ifeadi Odenigbo, Current defensive end for the Cleveland Browns
- Chip Reese, poker player
- Joe Thuney, Current offensive guard for the Chicago Bears
- Mike Tolbert, American football player

== Sister cities ==
Centerville has two sister cities, as designated by Sister Cities International:

- Canada Waterloo, Ontario, Canada
- Germany Bad Zwischenahn, Lower Saxony, Germany

== See also ==
- Mad River Road
- State Route 48
- State Route 725
