= Dayton Strangler =

Unidentified American serial killer

- Other names: "Strangler of Death Lane" "Man Gorilla of Death Lane" "Jack the Strangler"

Details
- Victims: 6–9+
- Span of crimes: 1900–1909
- Country: United States
- State: Ohio

The Dayton Strangler was an unidentified early 20th-century serial killer, responsible for the murders of five women and one man in Dayton, Ohio from 1900 to 1909. Although a multitude of suspects were arrested, including one who was wrongfully convicted, the murders remain officially unsolved to this day. Theories have surfaced tying the murders in Dayton to the Cumminsville Killer, another unidentified serial killer believed to have been active in the nearby city of Cumminsville around the same time.

== Murders ==
=== Ada Lantz ===
The daughter of a prominent local carpenter, the 11-year-old Lantz was found in a vault in her parents' back yard on October 14, 1900. The night before, there was a party in the residence, and while the adults were playing cards, Ada had left the house unnoticed. Half an hour later, her body was discovered. She had been badly mutilated and bruised, with a scar from a blunt weapon across her face, and had been sexually assaulted.

Several people were arrested, most notably a man named Emmons, who had been seen standing on the sidewalk near the Lantz residence by two women, followed a year later with the arrest of 18-year-old Harrison Blessing in a Germantown saloon. The authorities received a tip by William Hanna, owner of a bicycle shop from which Blessing had stolen a wheel. Although the young Harrison allegedly confessed to the murder, he was later released for lack of evidence.

=== Dona Gilman ===
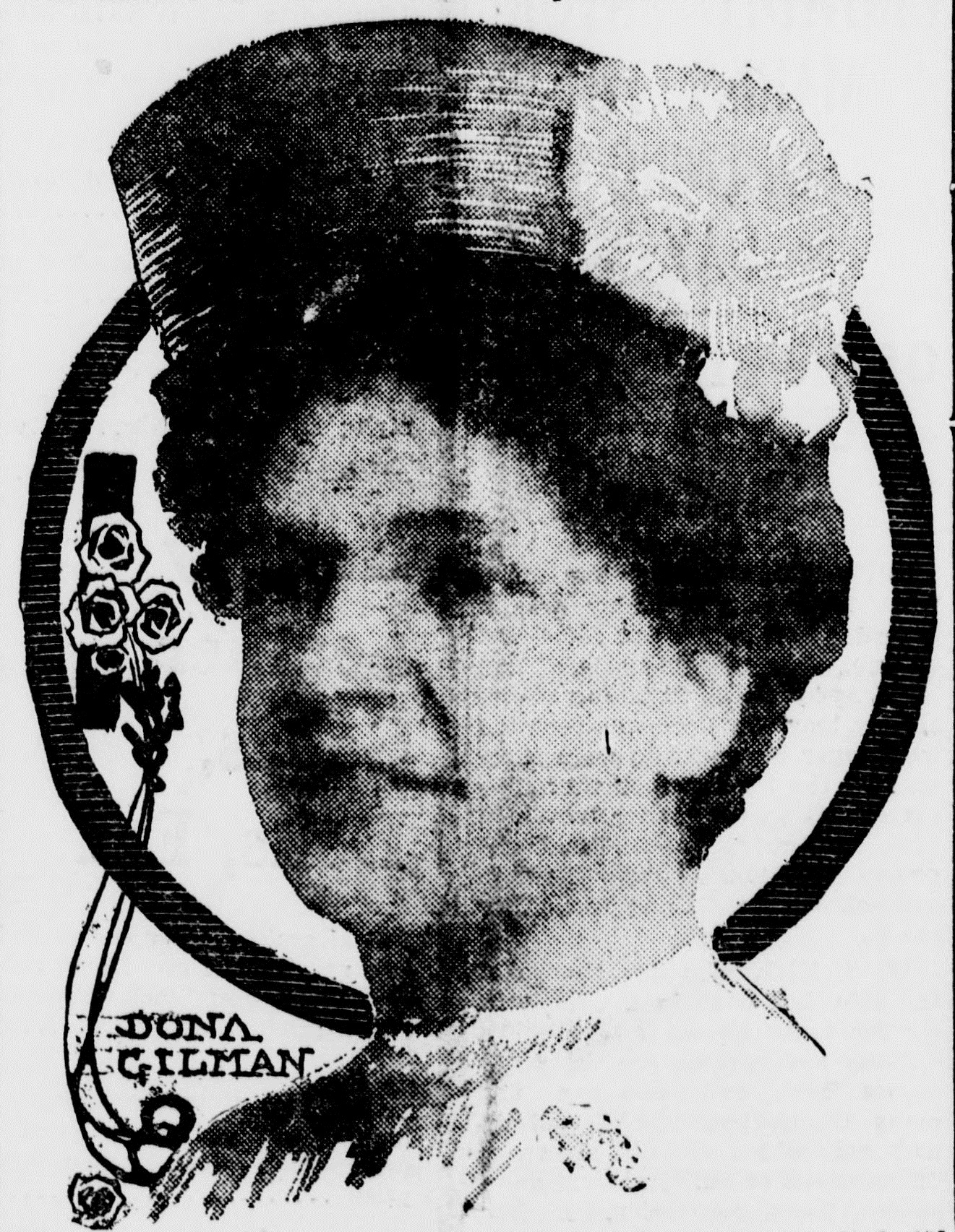
Photograph of Dona Gilman

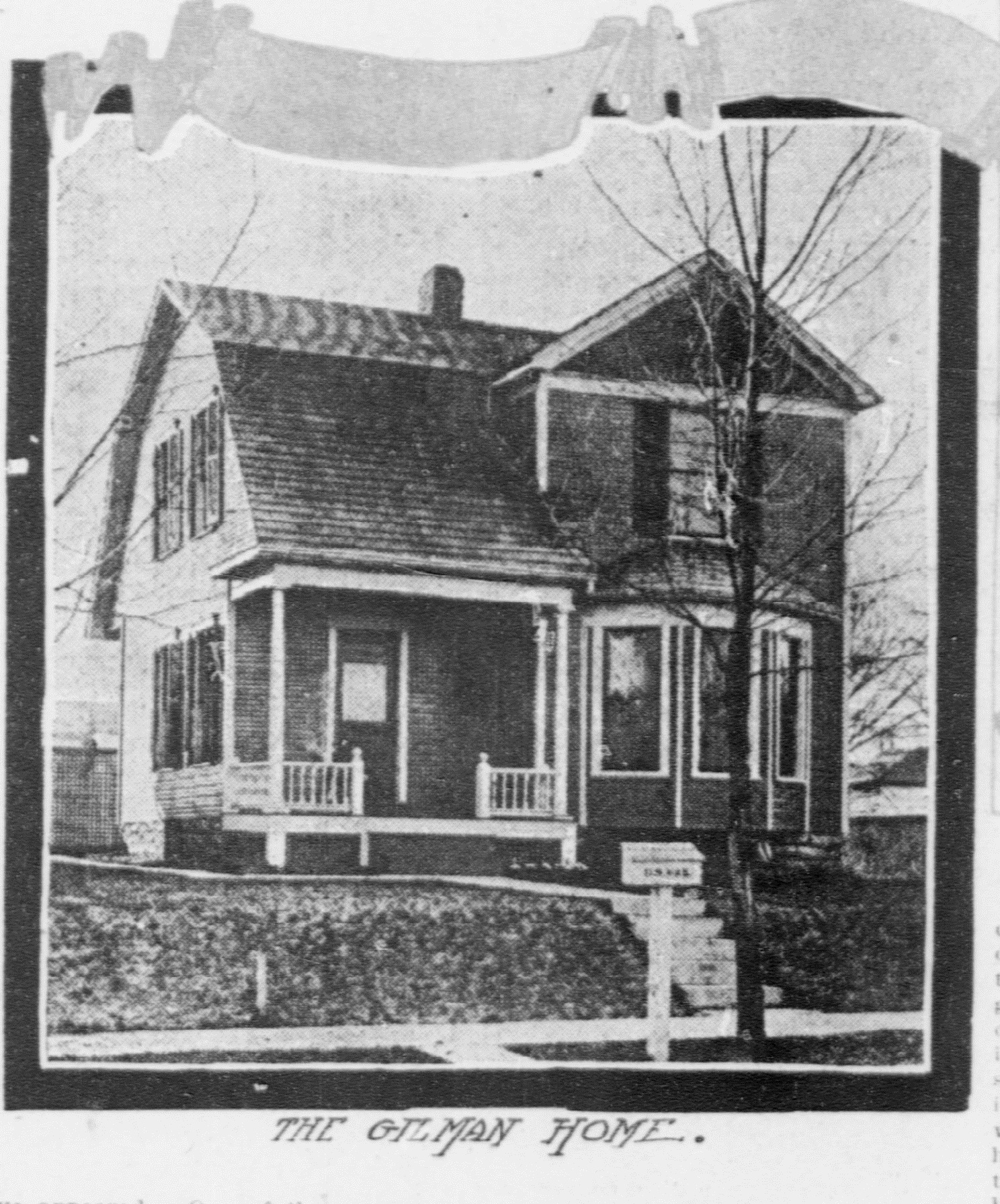
Image of the murder scene

On November 20, 1906, the 20-year-old bindery department employee of the National Cash Register Works left her job and headed home. Usually accompanied by her sister, Fayne, who was occupied at the time, Dona Gilman boarded a train car with a group of friends, staying with them before her transfer at Arlington Heights. Then, she got on another train car, reaching a short distance from her home before suddenly vanishing. The situation was unusual, as the night before she had just written a note to her lover Stanley Anderson, of Sharon, expressing her desire to see him on that Sunday evening.

On the night of her disappearance, a neighbor of the Gilmans, Robert Keyes, heard something that sounded like a struggle in their home. Soon after, Dona's body was found in some weeds 200 yards away from home, and on the opposite side of the street, her gloves and umbrella were found. The authorities quickly realised that she had not died on the spot, as the crime scene was visible from many homes, and that it was very likely she was murdered in a nearby house and then her body was dumped there. Police barred off the area from onlookers in search for clues, with one Cincinnati sleuth, William S. Heitzmann, allegedly finding a book which Gilman was reading on her ride home. Despite multiple suspect arrests and even a confession, nobody was convicted of her murder.

=== Anna Markowitz and Abe Cohan ===
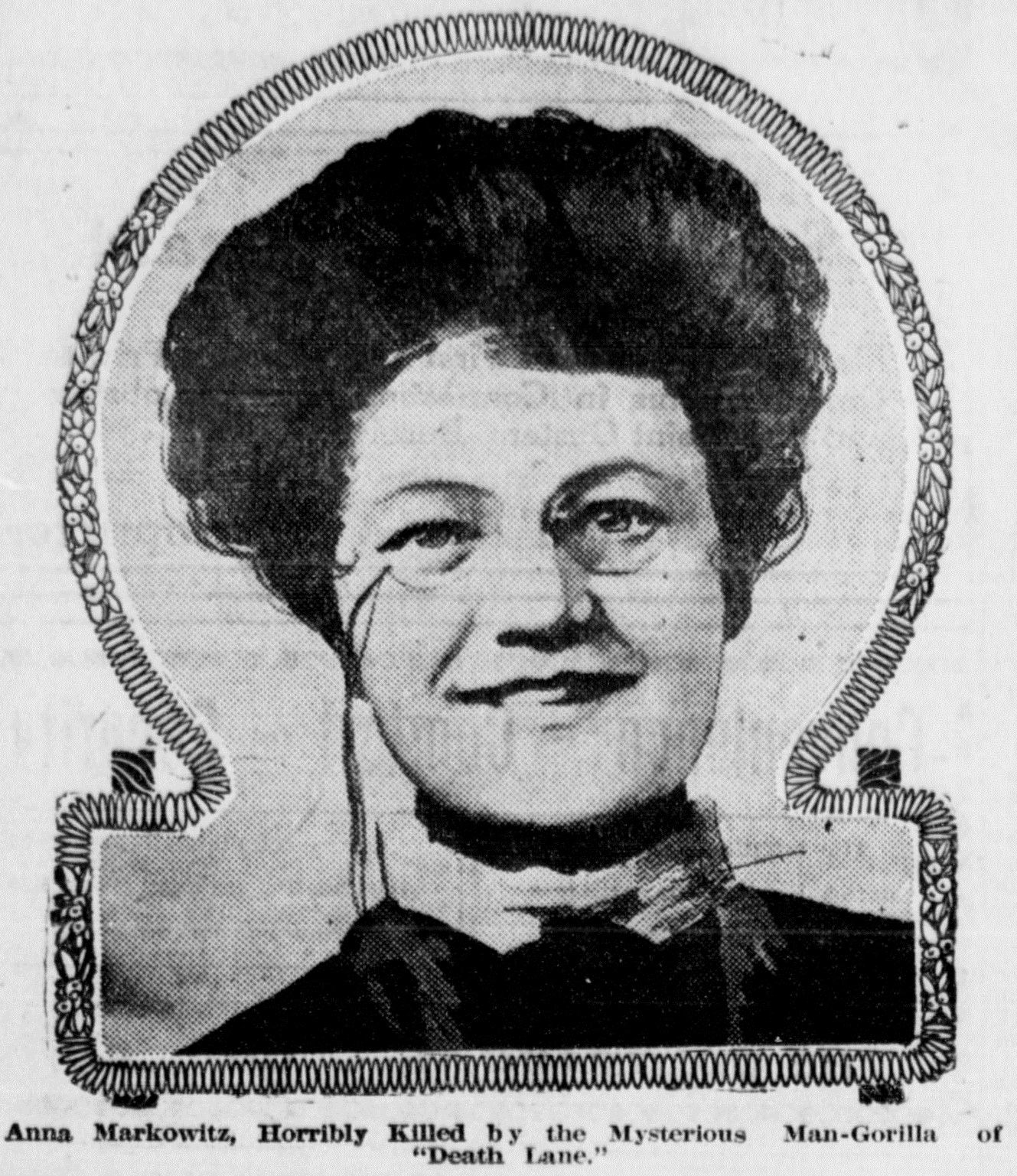
Photograph of Anna Markowitz

On August 4, 1907, the 24-year-old pawn broker's daughter, from Covington, Kentucky and her travelling salesman boyfriend, from Indianapolis, were walking along a lonely road near the National Soldiers' Home, accompanied by Anna's younger sister, Bertha. As they reached a completely isolated spot in McCabe Park and started chatting with each other, suddenly a man crept up behind Cohan and struck him with a baton. Surprised, Abe turned around, only to be shot twice in the stomach.

The attacker then turned towards the sisters, but the frightened Bertha ran off panicked to call the sheriff. A posse was quickly formed and they rushed back to the crime scene, where they found Cohan lying half-dead on the ground. There was also a trail leading to some bushes, where Anna's body was found. There was evidence of a brutal struggle and subsequent rape, with Markowitz's clothes nearly torn from her body and her arms covering her eyes. She had been strangled to death.

In the meantime, Cohan was rushed to the hospital, where although he was still alive, he was so dazed that any of his statements were considered incoherent. Two days later, he succumbed to his injuries. The only clue left to the mystery was provided by Eliza Virus, a black housekeeper who was close to the crime scene. She claimed that at around 10 o'clock on Sunday night, she heard gunshots and a woman crying in reproach. Soon after, the voice said: "Harry! Harry! Oh, Harry!". The mysterious "Harry" was never identified, and the man who was convicted of the double murder, Layton Hines, was later proven to be innocent.

=== Mary Forschner ===
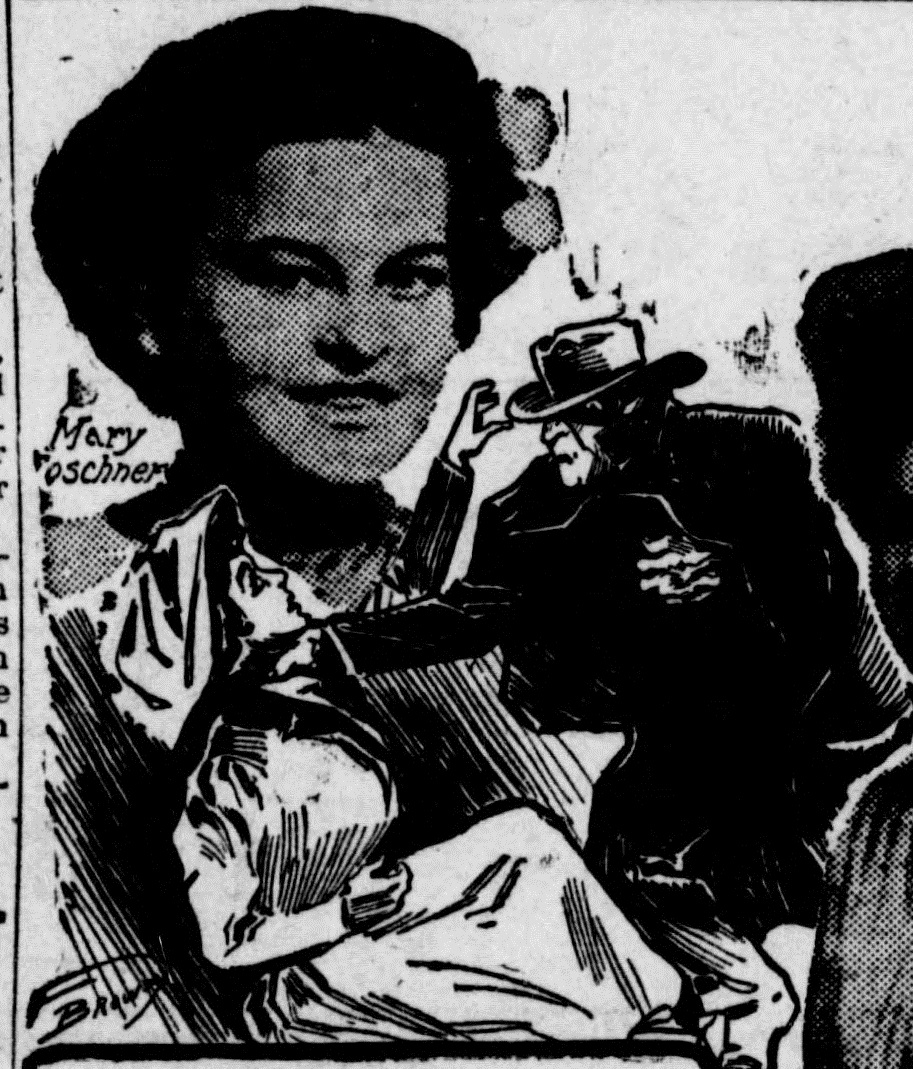
Photograph of Forschner and sketch of her killer

On January 24, 1909, the 15-year-old employee of the Kling tobacco warehouse, described as unusually pretty for her age, left the home of her merchant stepfather Robert Geppert in North Dayton. She was carrying a Dayton Savings and Trust Company's deposit book with $9 in it, for placing it in the bank. Her movements after leaving the house remain mysterious, but after she failed to return, her parents became alarmed. Geppert got himself a lantern and organized a search party with neighbors Arthur Hyre and John Merkle, without notifying authorities till midnight. Lt. Haley dispatched officers to aid in the search, but before they arrived, Robert Geppert noticed some disturbed soil which led to a trail. It ended in the estate of Grafton C. Kennedy, where, with the aid of his lantern, Geppert found Mary's lifeless body. The coroner concluded that she had been sexually assaulted and then strangled to death.

Two people claimed to have seen the assailant: Sam Morris, and Mrs. John Scheff. Morris said that he had heard cries at about 6:30 o'clock and looked outside, observing a man sitting on a fence and glancing at a dark spot in the fields. He tried to approach the mysterious stranger, who threatened to shoot him. Going back to retrieve his shotgun and fire off a warning shot into the air, by the time Morris returned, the man had vanished. Mrs. Scheff claimed that she had just gotten off a train car near the same spot, when a man appeared out of the darkness. She began running towards her home, with him following suit, but the man ceased after she entered her home. In the meantime, another woman, Mrs. Powers, was attacked, but thankfully saved by her husband James. The perpetrator escaped, but left his victim with nearly all clothes torn and her throat bruised.

The coroner, upon performing the autopsy, established that the killer had abnormally large hands, as his finger imprints extended far around the victim's neck. Four days later, a Pennsylvania railroad detective reported that a man matching the description was observed getting off a Dayton train car at Springfield. The suspect was a black man, with a roughly bandaged hand, scratched face and wore corduroy trousers, the same type of clothing that the supposed killer had worn. The suspicious man was never located.

=== Elizabeth Fulhart ===
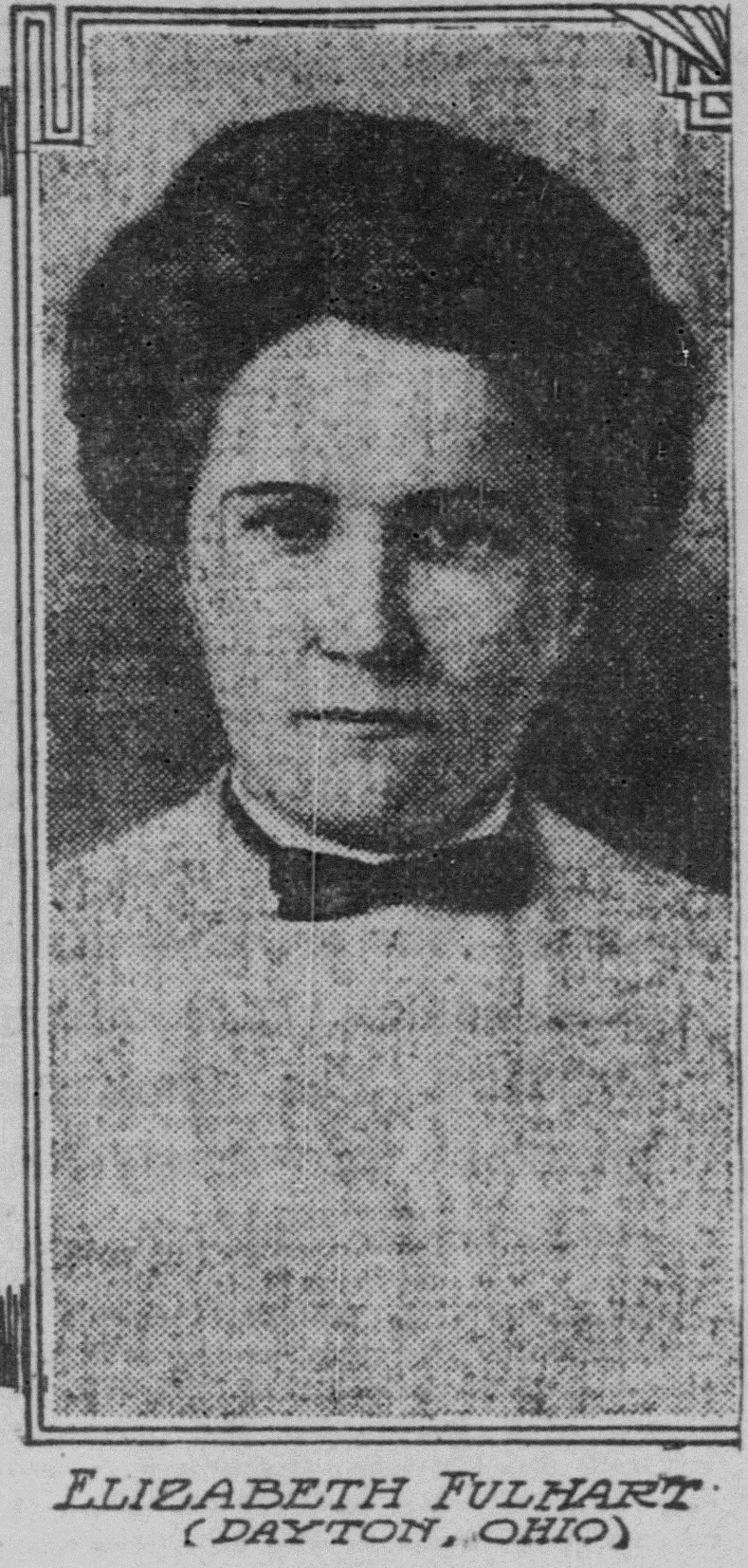
Photograph of Elizabeth Fulhart

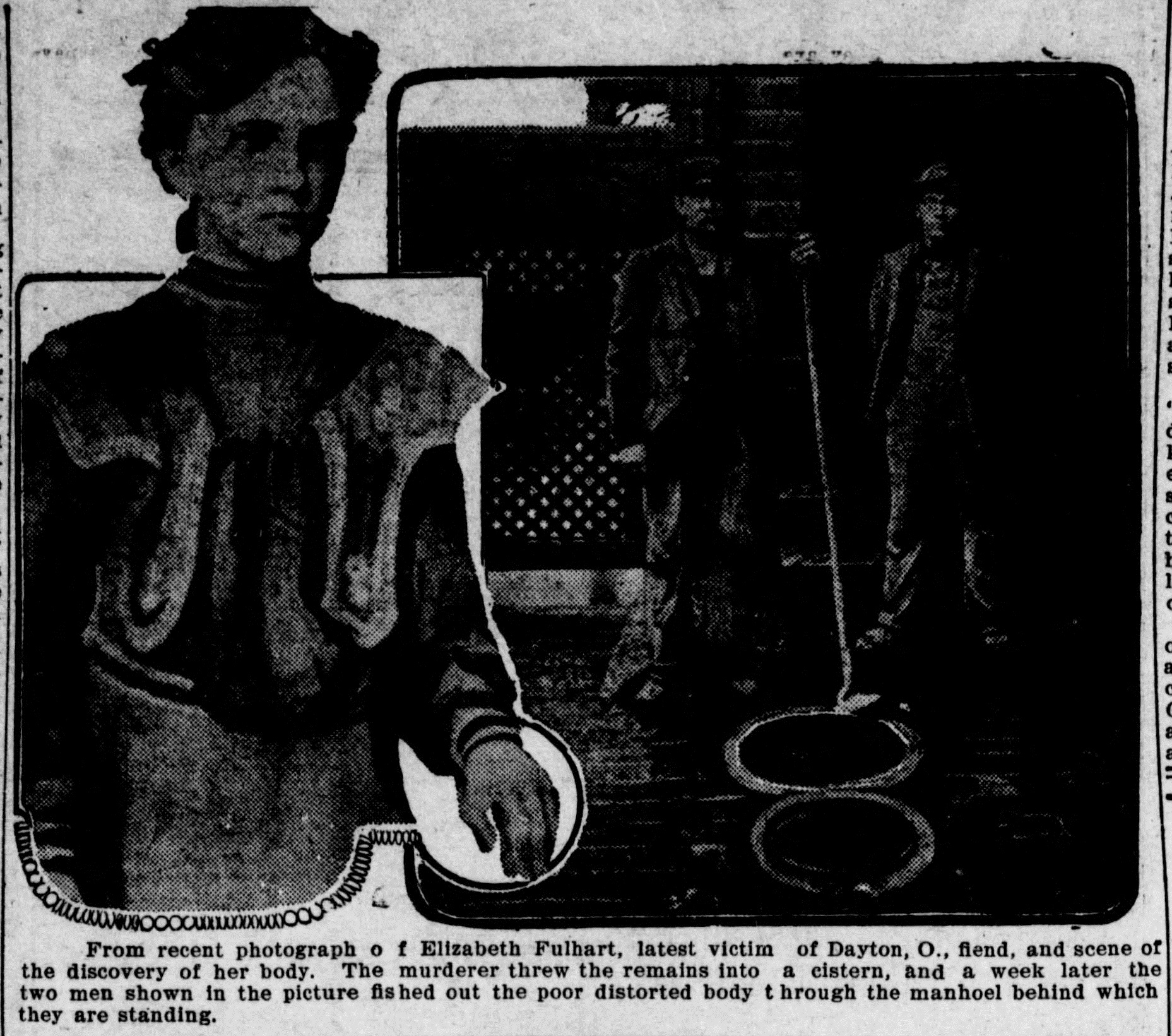
Alternative image of Fulhart and her murder scene

On February 7, 1909, the 18-year-old Fulhart, from Vandalia, arrived in Dayton in search of employment. The day after, she mysteriously vanished. A week after she had disappeared, two workmen decided to open an old cistern, only to find her body, wrapped in a gunny sack, floating in the water. She was fished out from the manhole, and identified via her brother. What was peculiar about the killing is that Fulhart appeared fully clothed, but was lacking her undergarments, suggesting that her killer had redressed her before dumping the body in the cistern.

Initially, authorities experienced difficulty in determining the cause of death, due to the notable lack of choking fractures on the neck, unlike the previous victims. Several theories were advanced, including suicide, poisoning, or that the bag was tied around her head and she was thrown while still alive. The murder shocked the denizens of Dayton, and church attendance among women dropped significantly. At night, almost no female was left unescorted. Following Fulhart's death, the killings ceased.

== Suspects ==
=== David Curtis ===
Known by the moniker of "Baby Dave", David was the 27-year-old adopted son of James Curtis, a painter who lived near the National Soldiers' Home. Described by associates as a half-wit, he did not live with his father, only going there once a week. According to James, ever since he was young, David had the habit of telling fantastical tales which he ascribed as his doing. A former employee of the National Cash Register, he knew about Dona Gilman.

The newsboy was arrested following a tip from a Cincinnati Post journalist, known only by the name of Myers, and then immediately confessed to the crime. According to his story, Curtis had noticed Gilman, deciding to board on the same train and get off at her stop. Walking on the opposite sidewalk and following Dona, he eventually crossed over, grabbed her umbrella and strangled her with it, without uttering a cry. After killing her, he knelt down and cried over his deed, vowing to never do it again. Despite the length of his confession, it was harshly doubted by many, as he had falsely confessed to another murder two years before and was subsequently exonerated.

Despite the circumstances, Coroner Walter L. Kline made a statement to the papers that he was completely assured that David Curtis is Gilman's killer, describing him as a not very bright, but definitely not crazy and surprisingly cunning individual. On the very same day that statement was written, Curtis suddenly revealed that he was threatened into confessing by County Detective Frank McBride, who had threatened him with the death penalty. He explained that on the date of the murder, he had been distributing newspapers for long after the crime was supposedly committed, and only heard of it from friends. Curtis, having a habit to play detective, then went on to conduct his own "investigation" of the murder scene.

Although several people testified against him, including his employer and Dona's brother, Collins, the defense team was well prepared, and the day after the testimony, it was announced that David Curtis was cleared of the Gilman murder. His dismissal was well received by the citizens of Dayton, who greeted and cheered for him upon release. A week after New Year's Eve, however, Coroner Kline urged further investigation against Curtis, to no avail.

=== The Gilman family ===
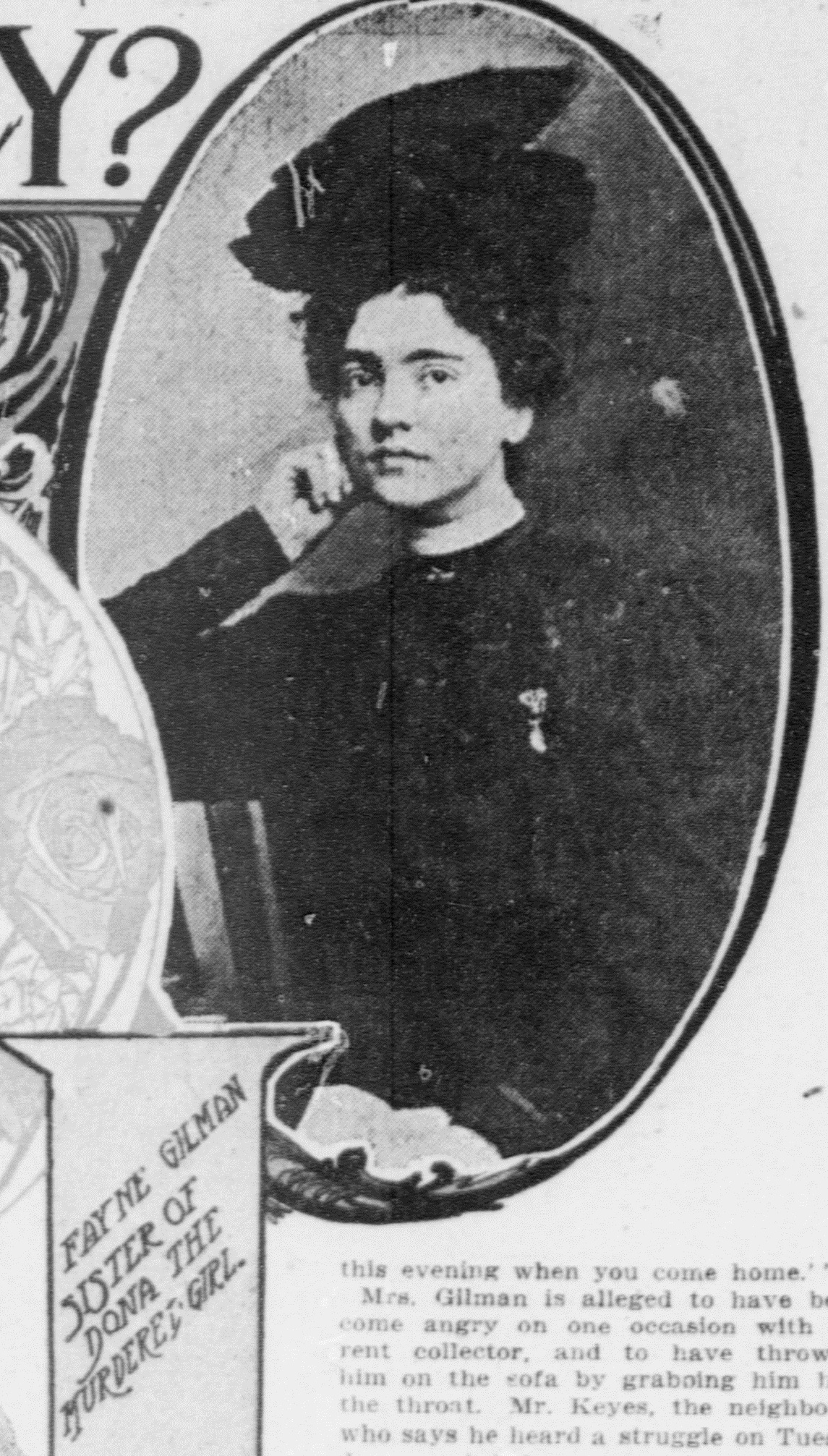
Photograph of Fayne Gilman

On December 10, 1906, the day that Dona Gilman's body was exhumed, an arrest warrant was put out against her mother, Kate. However, due to her ailing health, she was kept under watch, while two of her other children, Collins and Fayne, were arrested as accessories in their sister's murder. The siblings pleaded not guilty at their trial, with the 18-year-old Collins testifying against David Curtis, who he alleged had confessed to him as well. Upon hearing that there were arrest warrants for her children, Kate Gilman tried to commit suicide by jumping out a second-story window at the Miami Valley Hospital, but was restrained by the attending nurses.

She was ordered to be examined by two reputable physicians, Drs. H. J. Guy and A. H. Iddings, and although she resisted, they declared that she was healthy enough to be transported to jail. At trial, a female co-worker and friend of Dona revealed that the victim had been abused by her mother: for example, one time Dona was locked in a closet simply for wanting a new dress. On the night of the murder, the friend explained that the would-be victim was particularly afraid to go home.

On December 22, 1906, the Gilman family members were released from jail on a $5,000 bond. Collins was the first to be released, greeted by a crowd of friends, while his mother was put in an ambulance and driven off to St. Elizabeth Hospital. In April 1907, the family appeared in court again, this time including another daughter, Bessie, who lived in Germantown. All of them were released on bond again a few days later, the mother and son for $2,500 and the two daughters for $1,000 each. Soon after, the family was cleared of the murder. On December 21 of that year, Kate Gilman died from edema, and three days later, her body was buried beside that of her murdered daughter.

=== Layton Hines ===
On October 10, 1907, a black man by the name of Layton Hines was arrested on suspicion of killing Anna Markowitz and Abe Cohan, and it was later alleged by Sheriff Boes that he had made a full confession. According to one witness, Frank Allen, on the night of the murders he had seen Hines standing near the park's little bridge. He was greeted by Layton, and greeted back. Some time later, he heard four shots, but ignored it and moved on. The following day, when he heard of the tragedy, he quickly identified Hines as the man he had seen in the park. Hines' attorney, Kumler, tried to make Allen budge in his identification, but failed.

On the day of his trial, he confessed to never having a criminal record, and to have been intimidated into falsely confessing the crime. Hines was adamant that the Assisting Prosecuting Attorney Routzhan had abused him in the interview, and that Coroner Schuster and Sheriff Boes encouraged him to confess, in order to be "turned loose". Disregarding his statements, he was still convicted of the double murder, but was spared the death penalty. When the murders continued on, authorities later admitted that they had doubts about his conviction, and later released him.

=== Other suspects ===
During the long and complex investigation, for which even the head detective in the Gilman murder was once jailed for contempt of court, a multitude of suspects were arrested and later cleared from the various murders. They are the following:

- James Rogers - described as a "professional tramp", Rogers was arrested for the Gilman killing. Although leads were investigated, nothing was of use and the New York native was later released.
- Mr. Poole's suspect - On November 26, 1906, a man by the name of Mr. Poole arrived in Richmond, Indiana from Dayton, claiming to know the identity of Gilman's killer. He explained while resting at the Philips House in Dayton, he was approached by the alleged killer, who told him the details of the crime. According to his claims, the man's wife was away from home and since he had long loved the girl, he wanted Dona to confront his wife about their affair. Dona went with the man, where she met her fate and was later dragged off into the bushes. That man was supposedly later arrested in Cincinnati. The Richmond Palladium investigated Poole's claims, but found that no arrest had been made in the aforementioned city, with both cities' police departments debunking his story.
- Unnamed black man - One short report claimed that a restaurant cook by the name of Thomas Wilson, who was aboard the passenger train which Dona Gilman used, had seen a black man talk to Gilman, and later jump off 20 feet from where she was murdered. The authorities went after the man, but no follow-up report details what happened.
- William Partlon - A veteran of the Spanish–American War, Partlon was the-then latest in a series of arrests concerning the Gilman murder. He had bruises on his face and had both eyes blackened, and was seen near the crime scene. Although he refused to discuss how he acquired these injuries, he claimed to have an alibi, and was likely released soon after.
- The Markowitz siblings - Shortly following the double murder of Anna Markowitz and Abe Cohan, two of her brothers and her younger sister were detained on suspicion: Harry, Jacob and Bertha. According to authorities, they disapproved of the young couple's relationship, and wanted to get rid of both. Sheriff Boes even claimed that a canvas finger-stall found near the crime scene matched the imprint of Harry's thumb, which was coincidentally injured. A pair of handkerchiefs were also located near the crime scene. On August 8, the day of Anna's burial, however, the Markowitz siblings were all released and attended the funeral, in which the local rabbi cursed the ground on which the young girl was murdered.
- Charles Snyder - A factory worker and boarder of the Geppert home, Snyder was one of three persons taken into custody shortly after Mary Forschner's murder. He was first brought up by barber Leo Kunkel, who accused Snyder of entering into his shop in a panicked state, washing off mud and blood from his clothes before abruptly leaving. According to him, this occurred only half an hour after Forschner's murder. Little credit was given to his statements, and Snyder was proven innocent of the crime shortly after.
- Frank Smith (alias J. E. Smith) - Arrested alongside Cooley and Wilkie, Smith, a black man, was at the time charged with attacking a white girl on January 8, in Dayton's east end. His victim later identified him. Authorities suspected him of killing Fulhart solely based on his other crime, but had no conclusive proof, and later released him along with the others.
- Roy Cooley - A moulder and close friend of Fulhart, Cooley was detained by authorities for examination. However, no evidence was found, and he was later released.
- Albert Wilkie - Reputed to be Fulhart's fiancé, Wilkie was arrested alongside Cooley and Smith. Although detained for a bit longer than the former, he was later released due to lack of evidence as well.
- Elwood Weimer - A Black Canadian from Ottawa, Weimer was arrested on January 27, 1909, in Hamilton on suspicion of murdering Mary Forschner. He confessed to drinking heavily in the past six weeks, and this was his reasoning for his nervous behavior. A day later, he was released due to lack of evidence.
- Elmer Carr - On April 25, 1909, Carr was accused by his former employer Mary (or Carrie) Middlestetter of being responsible for arsons, pick-pockets and the murder of three women, two in Dayton and one in Boston, New York. One of the two Dayton murders was indeed that of Elizabeth Fulhart, reinforced by the fact that the pair were seen together on January 29. However, a few days later, Middlestetter made another statement which ironically exonerated Carr, at least concerning Fulhart's killing.

== See also ==
- List of fugitives from justice who disappeared
- List of serial killers in the United States

== Bibliography ==
- Brian Forschner (October 6, 2015). Cold Serial: The Jack The Strangler Murders. Morgan James. ISBN 978-1630475482.
