= Nancy Dutiel =

American model (active 1970s–1980s)

Nancy Dutiel (1952–2022) was an American model who was active in the 1970s and 1980s. She is best known for having been a spokesmodel for the French cosmetics company Lancôme from April 1977 until the early 1980s for the U.S. market.

Dutiel was born in Ohio in December 1952 to Glenn and Davida Dutiel and raised in Centerville, where she attended high school. She graduated from Centerville High School in 1971, having been a cheerleader and a coed drill team member. After high school, Dutiel enrolled in Ohio State University to study biology and also considered learning how to teach the deaf.

After entering a pageant in nearby Kettering, however, Dutiel won a free charm school course that led her to travel to New York in October 1972, where she became a model with the Wilhelmina agency. Dutiel stayed with Wilhelmina until 1975, when she switched to the Ford modeling agency. In August 1976, Dutiel modeled in a test ad campaign for Lancôme and then went to Italy to do some more modeling work. When she returned to the United States, she learned that Lancôme's French office responded positively to her test photos. Lancôme subsequently signed her to an exclusive contract, making her the company's U.S. spokesmodel.

"I always hoped for a cosmetic contract," Dutiel told the Dayton Daily News in 1980. "The contract excludes you from doing product competition and guarantees you to work [eighteen days a year], though I almost work every day doing department store things and advertising."

Besides Lancôme, Dutiel also modeled for covers of Vogue, Modern Bride, Women Today, and the German magazine Brigitte. Her career took her to Europe and Japan, and she also lived in Italy for a time.

Dutiel was replaced by Isabella Rossellini as Lancôme's spokesmodel at the end of 1982. She made plans to continue her modeling career, including acting classes to be able to try out for speaking parts in commercials.
