= Michele H. Miller =

American mechanical engineer

Michele Helene Miller is an American mechanical engineer, and a professor of mechanical engineering and associate dean of engineering at Campbell University, a private Christian university in North Carolina. Her research interests include precision machining and micro-electromechanical systems; she has also published in engineering education and is active in engineering accreditation as an evaluator for ABET.

== Education and career ==
Miller's father worked as a metallurgist for General Motors; her mother was a schoolteacher. She grew up in Centerville, Ohio, and graduated from Centerville High School. Next, she majored in mechanical engineering at Duke University, graduating in 1986, and began working in industry as a manufacturing engineer at General Motors.

Returning to academia for graduate study in mechanical engineering at North Carolina State University, she received a master's degree in 1991 and completed her Ph.D. in 1994. Her doctoral dissertation, A model for the grinding of brittle materials, was supervised by Thomas A. Dow.

She was a faculty member at Michigan Technological University before moving to her present position at Campbell University in 2017.

== Recognition ==
The North Carolina State University Department of Mechanical and Aerospace Engineering named Miller to its alumni hall of fame in 2017.

Miller was elected as an ASME Fellow in 2018. In 2020, Engineering Unleashed, an academic community focused on engineering education, named her as an Engineering Unleashed Fellow.
