= Town Hall Theatre (Centerville) =

Theatre group in Centerville, Ohio, United States

Coordinates: 39°37′45″N 84°09′33″W

Town Hall Theatre is a children’s theater group located in Centerville, Ohio. It operates and performs in Washington Township Hall and is part of the recreation department of Washington Township, Montgomery County, Ohio.

== Productions ==
The theatre group was formed in 1991 under the name All Children's Theatre. Town Hall Theatre presents about eight to ten shows per season. There are three producing arms of All Children's Theatre. The Landmark Children's Theatre Company productions include professional adult actors, volunteer community adult performers, and youth. The All Children's Theatre produces ensemble cast shows for audiences ranging from ages 7 to 18. The ACT Touring Teens group is made up of high school student actors on an in-school tour.

In addition to the production schedule, the group offers acting, dance, and music classes. Washington Township also sponsors performing arts summer camps at the theatre.

According to the Township, Town Hall Theatre performs for approximately 20,000 audience members and has 400 community volunteers.

== Premises ==
Built in 1908, Washington Township Hall previously served as the seat of the Washington Township government. During this time, it was a meeting space for township trustees and a venue for community activities. It served as the Washington Township government offices until 1985.

In 1989, the township decided to turn the building into a performing arts center. Between 1992 and 1996, the building was renovated to include an auditorium, a lobby, rehearsal space, a dance studio, and a scene shop.

In 2019, a disagreement arose between the city of Centerville and Washington Township regarding how to use the open space adjacent to the theater, with the Township preferring to keep it as green space. Both parties bid on the property; Centerville won the bid.

The Centerville Noon Optimist Club donated $20,000 to the Town Hall Theatre in 2023 for renovations, helping to replace the Theatre's seating area and contributing to the improvement of comfort and acoustics.

== Seasons ==
=== 2012–2013 "Tales Old and New" Season ===
- Disney's The Little Mermaid Jr.
- Duck for President
- 'Twas the Night Before Christmas
- Lilly's Purple Plastic Purse
- Rapunzel! Rapunzel! A Very Hairy Tale
- Disney's Beauty and the Beast Jr.

=== 2011–2012 "Kids Take Flight" Season ===
- Disney's Camp Rock the Musical
- Gooney Bird Greene
- Pinkalicious the Musical
- Frosty the Snowman
- Click Clack Moo: Cows that Type
- How I Became a Pirate
- The Musical Adventures of Flat Stanley Jr.

=== 2010–2011 "Character Counts" Season ===
- Disney's Alice in Wonderland Jr.
- The True Story of the Three Little Pigs
- Junie B Jones: Jingle Bells Batman Smells
- The Berenstain Bears Onstage
- Pinkalicious, The Musical
- The Phantom Tollbooth
- Honk Jr.

=== 2009–2010 "Dreams Come True" Season ===
- Disney's High School Musical and High School Musical 2
- Junie B. Jones: And a Little Monkey Business
- Disney's Geppetto and Son
- Winnie the Pooh
- Madeline and the Gypsies
- Stellaluna
- Disney's Cinderella and Sleeping Beauty

=== 2008–2009 "Pure Imagination" Season ===
- How to Eat Like a Child
- Disney's 101 Dalmatians/The Aristocats
- Brave Little Tailor
- Madeline's Christmas
- Brave Irene
- James and the Giant Peach
- If You Give a Mouse a Cookie
- Willy Wonka

=== 2007–2008 "We're all in this together" Season ===
- Disney's High School Musical
- The Best Christmas Pageant Ever
- Bridge to Terabithia
- A year with Frog and Toad
- The Stinky Cheese Man and Other Fairly Stupid Tales
- Disney's Mulan
- Nate the Great
- Miss Nelson has a Field Day
- Where The Red Fern Grows

=== 2006–2007 “Oh the Thinks you can Think” Season ===
Schedule for the current season:

- The Frog Prince, September 7–10, 2006 (Rec' West)
- The Little Mermaid, September 28 – October 15, 2006
- The Cay, November 2–5, 2006 (Rec' West)
- A Little Princess, December 1–17, 2006
- Miss Nelson is Missing, January 11–21, 2007 (Rec' West)
- Seussical, March 16 – April 1, 2007
- Lily's Purple Plastic Purse, April 12–15, 2007 (Rec' West)
- The Trumpet of the Swan, May 3–20, 2007

== External sites ==
Official website
