= Premier Health Miami Valley Hospital South =

Geography
- Location: 2400 Miami Valley Drive, Centerville, Ohio, United States
- Coordinates: 39°39′10″N 84°06′53″W

Organization
- Care system: Public
- Type: Community hospital
- Network: Premier Health Partners

Services
- Emergency department: Yes
- Beds: 60

Helipads
- Helipad: FAA LID: 00OI

History
- Founded: 2007

Links
- Website: www.premierhealth.com/locations/hospitals/miami-valley-hospital-south
- Lists: Hospitals in Ohio

Premier Health Miami Valley Hospital South is a hospital in Centerville, Ohio. It is a branch of Miami Valley Hospital in Dayton, Ohio and is managed by Premier Health. Designed and constructed in 2007 as an outpatient facility with an emergency department, the facility grew faster than expected and became a full-service hospital with as office building for physicians and a five-story patient wing added between 2009 and 2013. As of 2013, the hospital is a 579,000-square-foot (53,800 m^{2}) complex on a 115-acre (47 ha) campus adjacent to Interstate 675. It has 60 beds and features a number of specialty care options including oncology, cardiology, sports medicine, and maternity care to cater to the suburban community surrounding the hospital.

== History ==
Miami Valley Hospital South sits on a 115-acre (47 ha) campus along Interstate 675 south of Dayton, Ohio. The land had been owned by Premier Health for 20 years before the hospital was built in 2007, after several decades of planning for an outpatient hospital facility to serve southwestern Greene County, specifically Centerville and Bellbrook where significant suburban housing development was taking place. It was also constructed with partnerships with local high schools in mind to expand athletic training services for student athletes. The project was overseen by Premier Health employee Joann Ringer, who later became chief operating officer of the facility.

The original 268,000-square-foot (24,900 m^{2}) outpatient facility was in October 2007 at a construction cost of $79,500,000, and featured a general surgery emergency department with 10 operating rooms. It had a total of 200 employees, many of whom were trained at Miami Valley Hospital. The facility also featured a helipad for CareFlight service, as emergencies were transferred to the Level I Trauma Center at Miami Valley Hospital. Originally called Miami Valley South Health Center, traffic to the hospital quickly escalated beyond what was projected, in part because of consumer demand for care in a single facility and without the need to transfer to other hospitals.

In November 2008, the first inpatient beds were added following demand for recovery services from the emergency department, including several observation beds and 10 short-stay beds, at which point the facility was renamed Miami Valley Hospital South. These expansions were completed in June 2009. In late 2010, the hospital added a 215,000-square-foot (20,000 m^{2}), five story patient wing to the facility, initially planned to cost $64,200,000. A $20,000,000 comprehensive cancer care center was also added along with an office building for physicians. Ultimately this expansion was completed at a cost of $51,000,000, which brought the hospital size to 579,000 square feet (53,800 m^{2}). The new patient wing opened in March 2012. This new wing included a 24-bed general surgery floor, a 24-bed orthopedic surgery floor, and a 12-bed maternity ward completed in August 2012, for a total of 60 beds. At the end of this expansion, the number of staff grew to 478 full- and part-time employees. The hospital saw admittance to its emergency department grow from 19,500 in 2007 to 2008 to 32,000 in 2012. From August 2012 to February 2013 the number of babies born in the maternity ward was 550.

The facility features architecture intended to evoke a sense of calm. It was constructed with a central courtyard and a number of windows overlooking it, as well as nature-related artwork and architecture. There are also separate hallways for staff and visitors in order to make the interior appear less crowded. The hospital also features a substantial amount of parking and a shuttle service to the entrance. Miami Valley Hospital South was constructed with future expansion in mind, including empty floors to provide up to 48 beds, provision for a third 60-bed hallway, and a second-floor expansion plan for the maternity ward to add 12 beds. In 2018, a cardiac catheterization lab, twenty beds, and six new operating rooms were added as part of a $60 million expansion project.

== Services ==
The hospital features a number of inpatient support services including a cafeteria food facility which also delivers food to patient rooms, housekeeping and environmental services. Among the hospital's medical specialties are general surgery and orthopedics. The hospital also features a high-risk breast cancer center aimed at preventative care for patients at risk of developing cancer, staffed by surgical oncologists and staff nurses. Among other specialty services are cardiology, sports medicine, and a hyperbaric oxygen therapy chamber. The hospital has equipment for cardiac monitoring, magnetic resonance imaging, and computed tomography

The facility also features a physician office building which houses staff practitioners as well as offices for physicians with independent practices within the community. The 78,000-square-foot (7,200 m^{2}) building, opened in January 2013, also features a comprehensive cancer care center focused on outpatient cancer care treatment, as well as space for patient education and support groups. In addition to physician labs, the facility also houses a concrete enclosed vault which houses a linear accelerator, which is used for precision cancer treatments. When Miami Valley Hospital South opened, the specialists for ovarian cancer and uterine cancer were moved there from Miami Valley Hospital.

On May 1, 2024, the hospital ceased being a Level III trauma center, citing a desire to focus on fast-growing specialties including orthopedics and oncology. The hospital had previously ceased to provide labor and delivery services in 2022 for similar reasons, allowing the beds to be reused in other medical and surgical areas. An expanded cancer center opened in 2022.

== See also ==
- List of hospitals in the United States
- List of hospitals in Ohio
