= Centerville High School (Ohio) =

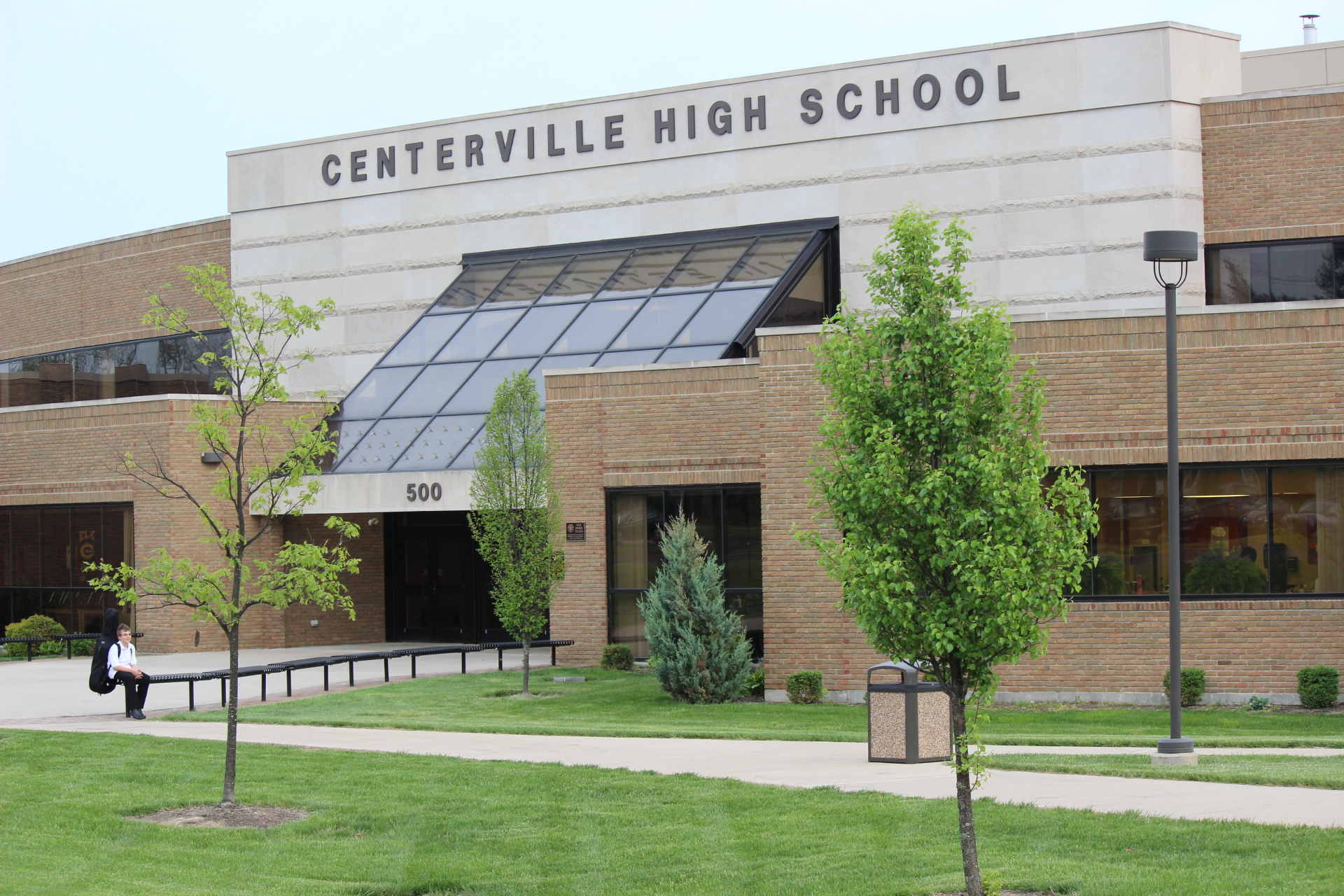

Location
- 500 East Franklin Street; Centerville, Ohio 45459; United States; 39.627528°N 84.148074°W

Information
- Type: Public secondary school
- Motto: Let Us Be Known By our Spirit
- Established: 1885; 141 years ago
- School district: Centerville City Schools
- NCES School ID: 390437300267
- Principal: Jen Riegel
- Teaching staff: 138.65 (FTE)
- Grades: 9–12
- Enrollment: 2,720 (2024–2025)
- Student to teacher ratio: 19.62
- Color: Black Gold
- Mascot: Elk
- National ranking: 1,757
- Yearbook: Elkonian
- Website: www.centerville.k12.oh.us

Centerville High School is a public school of secondary education for grades 9–12 located in Centerville, Ohio, USA, situated 10 miles (16 km) south of Dayton. It is the only high school in the Centerville City School District, which also includes three middle schools, six elementary schools and two K–1 schools, or "primary villages". The district serves all of the city of Centerville and Washington Township, as well as a portion of the city of Kettering.

== History ==
Washington Township first began offering formal education in 1803 with a school building for grades 1–6. Nine one-room elementary schools were also erected. In 1848, the Old Stone Academy was constructed and the first high school courses were offered. Private schools over the blacksmith shop and in Old Township Hall offered similar courses.

In 1885, the Washington Township High School was built at 101 West Franklin Street. The first class graduated in 1890. In 1924, the Magsig building was built as a centralized school (grades 1-12). Washington Township High School became a member of the North Central Association of Colleges and Secondary Schools in 1951. In April 1955, the Central Unit of what is now Cline Elementary School was opened and junior high and the three-year high school were moved there. Kindergarten was added at Magsig. The name of the high school officially became Centerville High School in 1963. In 1966, CHS became a four-year high school with classes split by department between Magsig and Cline (then known as the South building) and students walking between classes. Tower Heights Middle School and Hithergreen Middle School were built for grades 6–8 in 1966. Hadley Watts Middle School became the third middle school in 1969. In 1973, the first part of the present-day high school was completed, becoming the East Unit in addition to the Magsig and South Units.

In 1975–76, the entire high school was finally taught inside the current building with Central, East and West units. Magsig was changed to a middle school, and the old South was changed to W.O. Cline Elementary School. The stadium and athletic fields were built behind the high school in 1979 and the auxiliary gymnasium, as well as the new South Unit in 1980. In 1982, Hithergreen Middle School and Village South Elementary School were closed. Hithergreen became a community center for active seniors. In 1991, Village South was reopened as Centerville Kindergarten Village. During the 1999–2000 school year, the Athletic Entrance, Athletic Office, and weight room were completed.

In May 2005, voters in Centerville/Washington Township supported a $4.4 million operating levy and a $2.5 million bond issue designed to compensate for a predicted district enrollment increase to 9,000 students. Part of this levy includes a new addition to the front. The addition, completed during summer 2007, includes nine new chemistry and physics classrooms and three new laboratories, a new main entrance, additional classroom space and improved cafeteria commons areas. The new cafeteria areas provide several booths for students and less space for the lunch line area.

== Athletics ==
The athletic teams at Centerville are known as the Elks. Centerville is a member of the Greater Western Ohio Conference. 16 sports are offered for boys and 18 sports are offered for girls. The Elks have had success at both the GWOC and the OHSAA levels. Centerville's student section is known as "the Herd" and Centerville's stadium is nicknamed "the Black Hole."

=== State championships ===
This is a list of Centerville's state team championships in the Ohio High School Athletic Association:

- Baseball - 1928
- Girls' Gymnastics – 1977
- Ice Hockey – 1979
- Boys' Gymnastics – 1980
- Girls' Track and Field – 1981
- Boys' Soccer – 1984
- Girls' Golf – 1995, 2022
- Girls' Swimming and Diving – 2004
- Girls' Bowling – 2008, 2019
- Girls' Cross Country – 2014, 2015, 2016, 2017, 2020
- Boys' Basketball - 2021
- Boys' Bowling - 2022

==== Other titles not sponsored by the OHSAA ====
The boys' volleyball team has won three state championships (1994, 2001, 2002) as members of the Ohio High School Boys Volleyball Association.

The Centerville Jazz Band (Marching Band) won Grand Nationals in 1992.

Centerville's Valorant team won the Esports Ohio State championship in 2025.

== Notable alumni ==
- Hannah Beachler (1989) - production designer
- Michael Bennett (2011) - American football player, Atlanta Falcons (NFL)
- Gabe Cupps (2023) - basketball player
- Claire Falknor (2012) - professional soccer player
- Eric Fanning (1986) - United States Secretary of the Army
- Quincy Hamilton (2016) – American baseball player (MLB)
- Andy Harmon (1987) - American football player (NFL)
- A. J. Hawk (2002) - American football player, Green Bay Packers (NFL)
- Kirk Herbstreit (1988) - ESPN sports analyst
- Ryan Hulings (2009) - professional soccer player, Pittsburgh Riverhounds (USL)
- Gordon Jump (1951) - actor (WKRP in Cincinnati)
- Pat Kilbane (1986) - stand-up comedian (Mad TV)
- Will Johnson (2007) - American football player, Pittsburgh Steelers (NFL)
- Cotie McMahon (2022) - basketball player for the Ole Miss Rebels
- Michele H. Miller (1982), mechanical engineering professor
- Melody Moezzi (1997) - Iranian-American attorney and writer
- Sean Murphy (2013) - Major League Baseball player
- Mike Nugent (2001) - American football player, Cincinnati Bengals (NFL)
- Ifeadi Odenigbo (2012) - American football player, Cleveland Browns (NFL)
- Dave Preston (1973) - American football player (NFL)
- Chip Reese (1969) - poker player
- Adam Replogle (2009) - American football player, Atlanta Falcons (NFL)
- Bryan Sellers (2000) - championship winning sportscar driver IMSA
- Timothy D. Snyder (1986) - historian, author, Yale University professor
- Tobin Sprout (1974) - artist and musician, songwriter and guitarist for Guided by Voices
- Bill Steele (1966) - cave explorer
- Jake Stovall (2013) - professional soccer player, Puerto Rico FC (NASL)
- Jeff Yagher (1979) - actor
- Kevin Yagher (1980) - special effects technician
- Andrea White (politician) - member of the Ohio House of Representatives
