= Premier Health Miami Valley Hospital =

Hospital in Ohio, United States

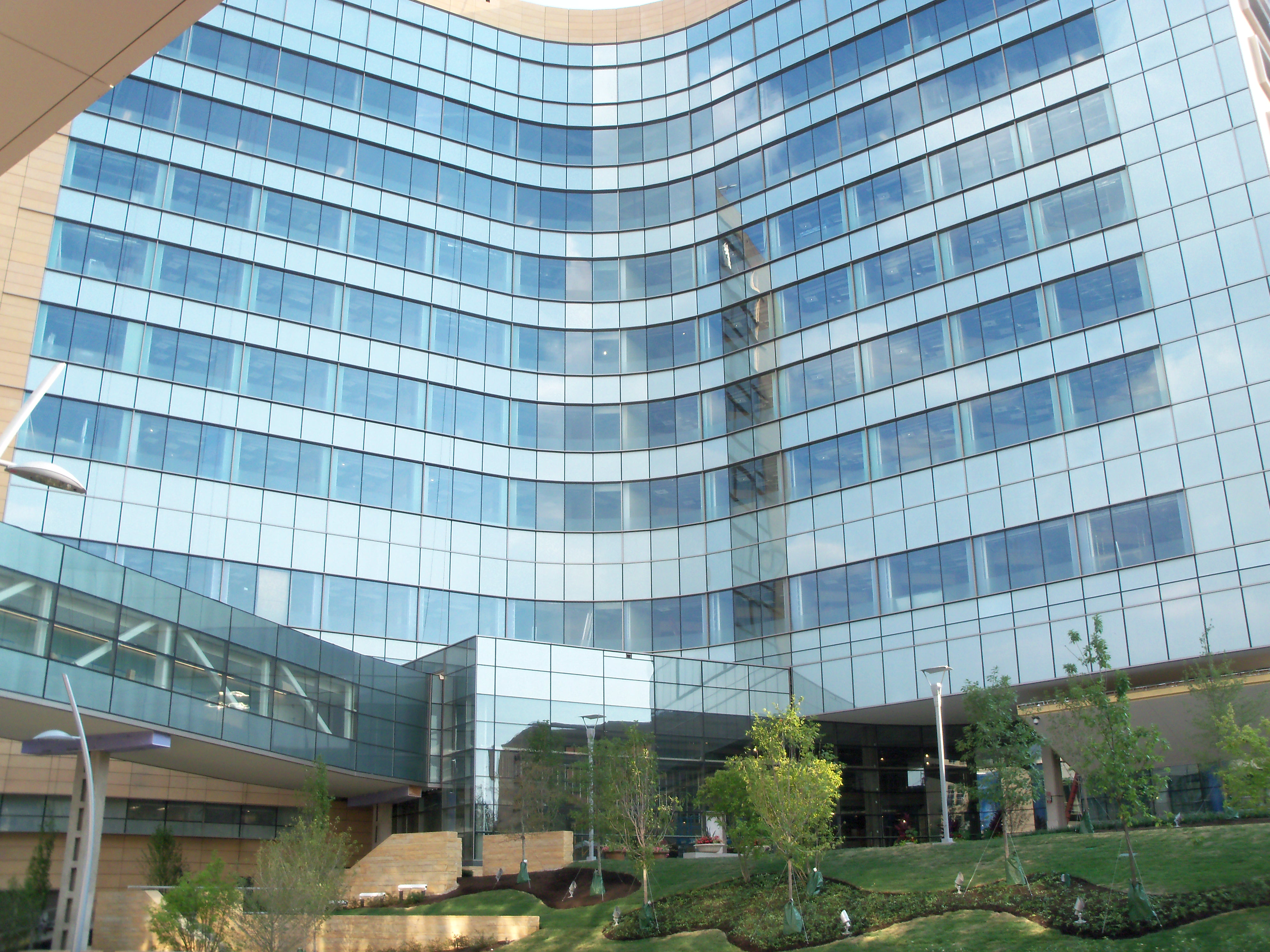
- Southeast Tower addition and main entrance.

Geography
- Location: (United States) 1 Wyoming St, Dayton, Ohio, USA
- Coordinates: 39.7448°N 84.1860°W

Organisation
- Care system: Private
- Type: Academic
- Affiliated university: Boonshoft School of Medicine of Wright State University

Services
- Standards: JCAHO accreditation Magnet status
- Emergency department: Level I Trauma Center
- Beds: 970

Helipads
- Helipad: FAA LID: 00OI

History
- Founded: 1890

Links
- Website: Miami Valley Hospital
- Lists: Hospitals in Ohio
- Other links: List of hospitals in the United States

Premier Health Miami Valley Hospital is a large urban hospital in Dayton, Ohio. It is part of the Premier Health Partners network. The hospital has two additional locations: Miami Valley Hospital South in Centerville, Ohio, and Miami Valley Hospital North in Englewood, Ohio. It has the Dayton region's only Level I Trauma Center, a regional adult burn center, and a Level 3 neonatal intensive care unit. Miami Valley Hospital has 7,370 employees and 970 beds and saw over 400,000 outpatient visits in 2007. Miami Valley Hospital's emergency and trauma center contains 72 beds and is the busiest emergency department in Ohio. Miami Valley Hospital also operates three air ambulances known as CareFlight. Miami Valley Hospital is a top 100 hospital in the United States for clinical excellence. The hospital also holds numerous awards from HealthGrades, Forbes, and U.S. News & World Report. The Boonshoft School of Medicine at Wright State University is an affiliated university. It also holds recognition as a Magnet hospital, the highest distinction in nursing. It gained its first designation in 2019.

== History ==
Miami Valley Hospital opened as the Protestant Deaconess Hospital in 1890. In 1895, the hospital treated patients for an average cost of 74 cents per patient per day. The hospital charged five dollars a week for a private room and whatever the patient could afford in the public wards. Dayton's first emergency room was opened beneath the main surgery floor in 1912. MVH also established an outpatient clinic in 1913 in response to the aftermath of the 1913 flood. From the 1920s to the 1950s, the hospital saw the most advancements in expansion and additions. As the hospital made advancements in care, in 1952, MVH opened the Radioisotope Laboratory, a forerunner to nuclear medicine. MVH was the first non-university hospital in Ohio to be authorized by the Atomic Energy Commission to use radioactive materials in research and patient care. In 1983, MVH's first air ambulance, CareFlight, was put into service, which made rapid emergency transport available within a 75-mile (121 km) radius. By its second year, CareFlight was averaging more than one transport every day. CareFlight operates three helicopters, based at the hospital main campus in Dayton, Lebanon-Warren County Airport, and Grimes Field in Urbana, Ohio, and Darke County Airport in Versailles, Ohio.

In 2010, the Neurological Institute at Miami Valley Hospital was established. The neurological institute is in partnership with Premier Health Partners and Wright State University. The Center focuses on the treatment, diagnosis, and research of neurological disorders. In addition, Miami Valley Hospital completed a 484,000-square-foot (45,000 m^{2}), 12-story tower, focusing on cardiac and orthopedic care. The expansion allowed for 98 percent of the hospital to contain all private patient rooms and for the hospital itself to grow to almost 3 million square feet (280×10^{3} m^{2}).

On June 2, 2022, a shooting occurred at the hospital, when Brian Booth, a 30-year-old inmate at the county jail, fatally shot Darrell Holderman, a 78-year-old security guard. Booth then reportedly pointed his gun at others in the hospital, before shooting himself dead in the parking lot.

== Locations ==
Other hospitals within the Premier Health Partners network are Atrium Medical Center in Warren County, Upper Valley Medical Center in Miami County, Miami Valley Hospital North in Englewood, Ohio, and Miami Valley Hospital South in Centerville, Ohio.

== See also ==
- List of hospitals in Ohio
- List of hospitals in the United States
