= Michael Bennett (defensive tackle, born 1993) =

American football player (born 1993)

No. 96, 93
- Position: Defensive tackle

Personal information
- Born: February 24, 1993 (age 33); Dayton, Ohio, U.S.
- Listed height: 6 ft 2 in (1.88 m)
- Listed weight: 287 lb (130 kg)

Career information
- High school: Centerville (Centerville, Ohio)
- College: Ohio State (2011–2014)
- NFL draft: 2015: 6th round, 180th overall pick

Career history
- Jacksonville Jaguars (2015–2018); Atlanta Falcons (2018–2019)

Awards and highlights
- CFP national champion (2015); 2× Second-team All-Big Ten (2013, 2014)

Career NFL statistics
- Total tackles: 16
- Sacks: 0.5
- Stats at Pro Football Reference

Benjamin Michael Bennett IV (born February 24, 1993) is an American former professional football player who was a defensive tackle in the National Football League (NFL). He played college football for the Ohio State Buckeyes.

== Early life ==
Bennett attended Centerville High School in Centerville, Ohio, where he was a first-team Division I All-Ohio performer who played in the U.S. Army All-American Bowl. He was a two-time Greater Western Ohio Conference player of the year and served as team captain for coach Ron Ullery's 2010 Centerville team that went 9–3 and reached the regional semifinals.

Bennett was also a top competitor in track & field. In 2011, Bennett’s final throw of 19.48 meters (63 feet, 11 inches) in the shot put at the Division I track and field meet was enough to vault him to a state title at his future home on the Ohio State University campus. He followed up with a second-place finish in the discus throw with a toss of 56.50 meters (185 feet, 4 inches). He had top-throws of 19.80 meters (64 feet, 11.5 inches) in the shot put, 59.83 meters (196 feet, 3 inches) in the discus pand 53.21 meters (174 feet, 6 inches) in the hammer at Centerville.

== College career ==
As a true freshman in 2011, Bennett played in all 13 games, recording 17 tackles and three quarterback sacks. As a sophomore in 2012, Bennett played in only eight games due to injury. As a junior in 2013, Bennett started all 13 games, recording 44 tackles and 7.5 sacks.

== Professional career ==
=== Pre-draft ===
Bennett, who was unable to work out at the 2015 NFL Combine due to injury, pulled up on his 40-yard dash attempt at Ohio State's Pro Day with a hamstring problem. The injury forced him to withdraw from the other on-field drills.

Pre-draft measurables
| Height | Weight | 40-yard dash | 10-yard split | 20-yard split |
|---|---|---|---|---|
| 6 ft 2 in (1.88 m) | 293 lb (133 kg) | 5.04 s | 1.74 s | 2.87 s |
All values from OSU Pro Day

=== Jacksonville Jaguars ===
On May 2, 2015, Bennett was selected by the Jacksonville Jaguars with the 180th overall pick in the sixth round of the 2015 NFL draft. In 13 games of his rookie season, Bennett recorded ten tackles and half a sack.

On September 3, 2016, Bennett was placed on injured reserve.

On September 19, 2017, Bennett was again placed on injured reserve after suffering a pectoral injury.

On September 11, 2018, Bennett was released by the Jaguars.

=== Atlanta Falcons ===
On October 2, 2018, Bennett signed with the Atlanta Falcons. He was waived on October 30, 2018. He signed a reserve/future contract with the Falcons on January 10, 2019.

On July 22, 2019, Bennett suffered a dislocated ankle and was placed on injured reserve.
