= Sean Murphy (baseball) =

American baseball player (born 1994)

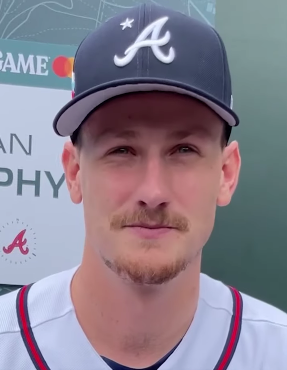
- Murphy with the Atlanta Braves in 2023

Atlanta Braves – No. 12
- Catcher
- Born: October 4, 1994 (age 32); Peekskill, New York, U.S.
- Bats: Right Throws: Right

MLB debut
- September 4, 2019, for the Oakland Athletics

MLB statistics (through 2026 season)
- Batting average: .226
- Home runs: 96
- Runs batted in: 295
- Stats at Baseball Reference

Teams
- Oakland Athletics (2019–2022); Atlanta Braves (2023–present)

Career highlights and awards
- All-Star (2023); Gold Glove Award (2021)

Sean Michael Murphy (born October 4, 1994) is an American professional baseball catcher for the Atlanta Braves of Major League Baseball (MLB). He was selected by the Oakland Athletics in the third round of the 2016 MLB draft. Murphy made his MLB debut in 2019 with the Athletics and won a Gold Glove Award in 2021. In 2023, He was traded to the Braves and he made his first All-Star Game in his first season with the team.

== Amateur career ==
Murphy attended Centerville High School in Centerville, Ohio, and Wright State University, where he played college baseball for the Wright State Raiders. In 2015, he played collegiate summer baseball with the Orleans Firebirds of the Cape Cod Baseball League, and was named a league all-star.

== Professional career ==
=== Oakland Athletics ===
The Oakland Athletics selected Murphy in the third round of the 2016 Major League Baseball draft. He made his professional debut with the Arizona League Athletics, playing one game with them, before being promoted to the Vermont Lake Monsters. He batted .237 with two home runs and seven RBIs in 22 games with Vermont. He started 2017 with the Stockton Ports and was promoted to the Midland RockHounds in June; he batted a combined .250 with 13 home runs and 48 RBIs in 98 games between the two teams. In 2018, he spent the majority of the year with Midland, slashing .288/.358/.498 with eight home runs and 43 RBIs in 68 games. He also played in three games for the Nashville Sounds at the end of the year. He began 2019 with the Las Vegas Aviators where he hit the first home run in Las Vegas Ballpark history.

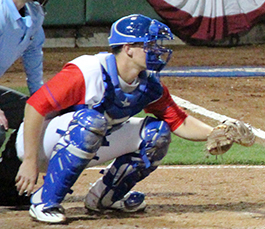
Murphy in 2017

On September 1, 2019, the Athletics selected Murphy's contract and promoted him to the major leagues. On September 4, in his MLB debut, Murphy hit his first career home run for his first hit against Jake Jewell. In 2020, Murphy played the majority of the season as the A's catcher, playing in 43 games. He hit .233 with 7 home runs and 14 RBI.

Murphy was awarded the Gold Glove Award on November 7, 2021.

=== Atlanta Braves ===
On December 12, 2022, the Athletics traded Murphy to the Atlanta Braves in a three-team trade, in which the Athletics acquired pitchers Kyle Muller and Freddy Tarnok, along with catcher Manny Piña and minor league pitcher Royber Salinas from the Braves and utility player Esteury Ruiz from the Milwaukee Brewers. The Brewers also acquired William Contreras and Justin Yeager from the Braves. Murphy and the Braves signed a six-year contract extension worth $73 million and a club option for the 2029 season. Murphy was named as an all-star for the first time as a starting catcher for the National League in the 2023 Major League Baseball All-Star Game. Murphy finished the 2023 season batting .251/.365/.478 with 21 home runs and 68 RBI, both of which were career-highs.

On March 30, 2024, during the first game of the 2024 season, Murphy suffered a left oblique strain after swinging at a pitch and was subsequently placed on the 10-day injured list. He made his return on May 27 versus the Washington Nationals where he went 1–of–4 with a RBI. In 2024, Murphy played 72 games as the Braves' catcher; he hit .193 with 10 home runs and 25 RBI.

Murphy was placed on the 30-day injured list to begin the 2025 season after suffering a fractured left rib in spring training. Chadwick Tromp began the year as the primary catcher for the Braves. After a rehab stint with Triple–A Gwinnett, Murphy was activated from the injured list on April 8 for a game against the Philadelphia Phillies where he went 2–for–4 with a home run and four RBI. In 94 appearances for Atlanta over the course of the year, he batted .199/.300/.409 with 16 home runs and 45 RBI. On September 8, it was announced that Murphy would require season-ending surgery to repair a torn labrum in his right hip.

On May 12, 2026, Murphy was ruled out for eight weeks due to a fractured left middle finger. He was activated from the injured list on August 3.
