= Ifeadi Odenigbo =

American football player (born 1994)

Profile
- Position: Linebacker

Personal information
- Born: April 8, 1994 (age 32); Bayonne, New Jersey, U.S.
- Listed height: 6 ft 3 in (1.91 m)
- Listed weight: 258 lb (117 kg)

Career information
- High school: Centerville (Centerville, Ohio)
- College: Northwestern (2012–2016)
- NFL draft: 2017: 7th round, 220th overall pick

Career history
- Minnesota Vikings (2017–2018)*; Cleveland Browns (2018); Arizona Cardinals (2018); Minnesota Vikings (2018–2020); New York Giants (2021)*; Cleveland Browns (2021); Indianapolis Colts (2022); Tampa Bay Buccaneers (2022); New York Jets (2023)
- * Offseason or practice squad member only

Awards and highlights
- Second-team All-Big Ten (2016)

Career NFL statistics
- Total tackles: 90
- Sacks: 14.0
- Forced fumbles: 1
- Fumble recoveries: 3
- Defensive touchdowns: 1
- Stats at Pro Football Reference

Ifeadikachukwu Anthony Odenigbo (born April 8, 1994) is an American professional football linebacker. He played college football for the Northwestern Wildcats and was selected by the Minnesota Vikings in the seventh round of the 2017 NFL draft.

== Early life ==
Born in Bayonne, New Jersey, to Nigerian parents Linda and Thomas Odenigbo, Ifeadi was the first member of his family born in the United States. He attended Centerville High School in Centerville, Ohio, where he played football firstly on offense and later as a linebacker and defensive end. He recorded 90 tackles and 10.5 sacks as a junior and 50 tackles and 8.5 sacks as a senior in 2011, helping lead Centerville to a 7–4 record and a Greater Western Ohio Conference championship, earning all-region, all-state and all-area player of the year honors. He was selected by USA Football to the 2012 U.S. Under-19 National Team and also competed in the Under Armour All-American Game and International Bowl.

Odenigbo also lettered in track and field all for four years for the Elks. In 2009, he set the freshman record in the 200-meter dash with a time of 22.91 seconds and also recorded the third-fastest time in the 400-meter dash (51.57s). He was all-district in the 110-meter and 300-meter hurdles as a junior with times of 15.14 and 39.93 seconds, respectively. As a senior, he posted a personal-best time of 11.28 seconds in the 100-meter dash at the regional championships and also anchored his team to a third-place finish in the 4 × 200 m relay (1:27.92) at the state championships.

== College career ==
Odenigbo played college football at Northwestern from 2012 to 2016. As a true freshman, he only appeared in a game against Vanderbilt before suffering a season-ending injury, but was granted hardship waiver and did not lose a year of eligibility. The next season, he saw time on the field as a third-down pass-rushing specialist and finished second on the team with 5.5 sacks. As a sophomore, Odenigbo played in all 12 games, primarily on third downs. He tied a Big Ten Conference record and became the first conference player since Bob Sanders to notch 3 forced fumbles in a game, doing so against Western Illinois in week 4. As a junior in 2015, he helped Northwestern to a 10–3 mark, notching 5 sacks on the season, including 1.5 against Stanford.

In his final collegiate season, Odenigbo was designated first-team All-Big Ten by the coaches and second-team by the media after leading the Big Ten Conference with 10 sacks on the year. In week 5, Odenigbo tallied 4 of the Wildcats' 6 total sacks against Iowa, tying the school record in the 38–31 victory.

Odenigbo ended his collegiate career ranked second in Northwestern school history with 23.5 sacks.

== Professional career ==
External videos
- Ifeadi Odenigbo's NFL Combine Workout

Pre-draft measurables
Height	Weight	Arm length	Hand span	40-yard dash	10-yard split	20-yard split	20-yard shuttle	Three-cone drill	Vertical jump	Broad jump	Bench press
6 ft 3 in (1.91 m)	258 lb (117 kg)	32 5/8 in (0.83 m)	10 1/2 in (0.27 m)	4.72 s	1.66 s	2.76 s	4.40 s	7.26 s	31.5 in (0.80 m)	10 ft 8 in (3.25 m)	25 reps
All values from 2017 NFL Combine

=== Minnesota Vikings (first stint) ===
Odenigbo was selected by the Minnesota Vikings in the seventh round, 220th overall, in the 2017 NFL draft. He was waived on September 2, 2017, and was signed to the practice squad the next day. He signed a reserve/future contract with the Vikings on January 22, 2018.

On September 1, 2018, Odenigbo was waived by the Vikings.

=== Cleveland Browns (first stint) ===
Odenigbo was claimed off waivers by the Cleveland Browns on September 2, 2018. On September 22, 2018, Odenigbo was waived by the Browns.

=== Arizona Cardinals ===
On September 24, 2018, Odenigbo was claimed off waivers by the Arizona Cardinals. He played in one game for the Cardinals before being waived on October 23, 2018.

=== Minnesota Vikings (second stint) ===
On October 31, 2018, Odenigbo was signed to the Vikings practice squad. He signed a reserve/future contract with the Vikings on January 2, 2019.

On August 31, 2019, the Vikings announced that Odenigbo had earned a spot on the 53-man roster. In Week 5, he got his first career sack, tackling Daniel Jones in a road win against the New York Giants. In Week 15 against the Los Angeles Chargers, Odenigbo sacked Philip Rivers once and recovered a fumble lost by Rivers which he returned for a 56-yard touchdown during the 39–10 win. In Week 17 against the Chicago Bears, Odenigbo recorded a strip sack on Mitchell Trubisky and recovered the football during the 21–19 loss.

Odenigbo was placed on the reserve/COVID-19 list by the Vikings on July 29, 2020, and activated from the list five days later.

=== New York Giants ===
On March 19, 2021, Odenigbo signed a one-year, $2.5 million contract with the Giants. He was released on August 31, 2021.

=== Cleveland Browns (second stint) ===
Odenigbo was signed to the Browns' practice squad on September 6, 2021. He was promoted to the active roster on September 21. In Week 14 Odenigbo recovered a fumble forced by Takkarist McKinley in a 24–22 win over the division rival Baltimore Ravens.

=== Indianapolis Colts ===
On June 12, 2022, Odenigbo signed with the Indianapolis Colts. He was released on December 20.

=== Tampa Bay Buccaneers ===
On December 27, 2022, Odenigbo was signed to the Tampa Bay Buccaneers practice squad.

=== New York Jets ===
On July 21, 2023, Odenigbo signed with the New York Jets. He was placed on injured reserve on August 14, 2023.

== Personal life ==
Odenigbo is of Nigerian descent. His brother Tito Odenigbo also spent the 2019 training camp with the Vikings.
