= Centerville City School District =

School district in Ohio

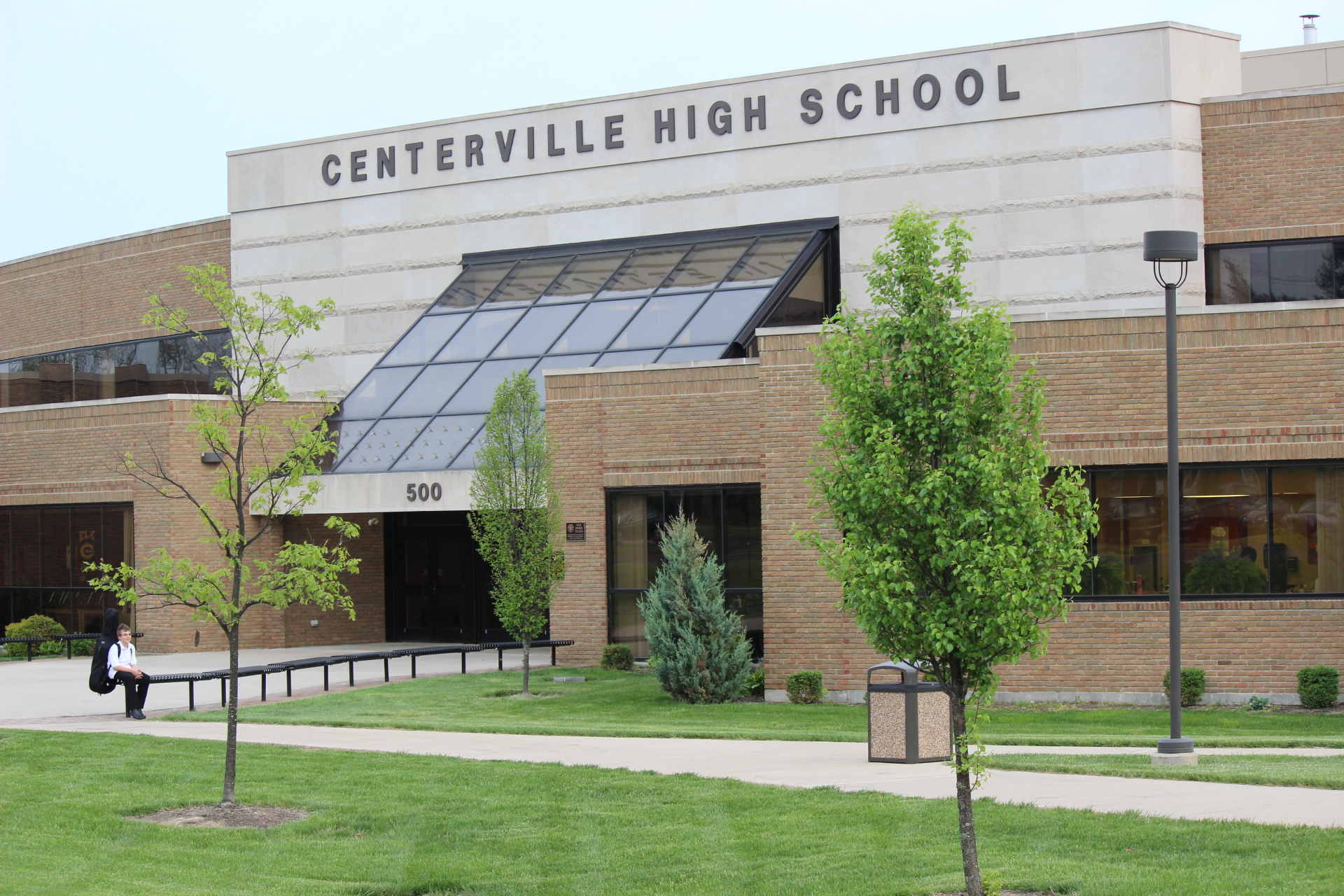
- Main entrance of Centerville High School, taken May 9, 2014

Address
- 500 Virginia Avenue Centerville, Ohio, 45458; United States
- Coordinates: 39°37′27″N 84°09′56″W

District information
- Grades: PK-12
- Superintendent: John Wesney
- Schools: 12
- NCES District ID: 3904373

Students and staff
- Students: 2,755 (2020-21)
- Teachers: 437.90 (on an FTE basis)
- Staff: 1,181.01 FTE

Other information
- Website: www.centerville.k12.oh.us

Centerville City School District is the school district serving Centerville and Washington Township, Ohio, United States. It's ranked as one of the top public schools in the US and is ranked 2nd in the region.

== Schools ==
Centerville City School District has eight elementary schools, three middle schools and one high school.

=== Secondary schools ===
- Magsig Middle School
- Tower Heights Middle School
- Watts Middle School
- Centerville High School

=== Primary schools ===
- Cline Elementary
- Driscoll Elementary
- John Hole Elementary
- Normandy Elementary
- Primary Village North
- Primary Village South
- Stingley Elementary
- Weller Elementary

== See also ==
- List of school districts in Ohio
