= Holes Creek =

Stream in Ohio, United States

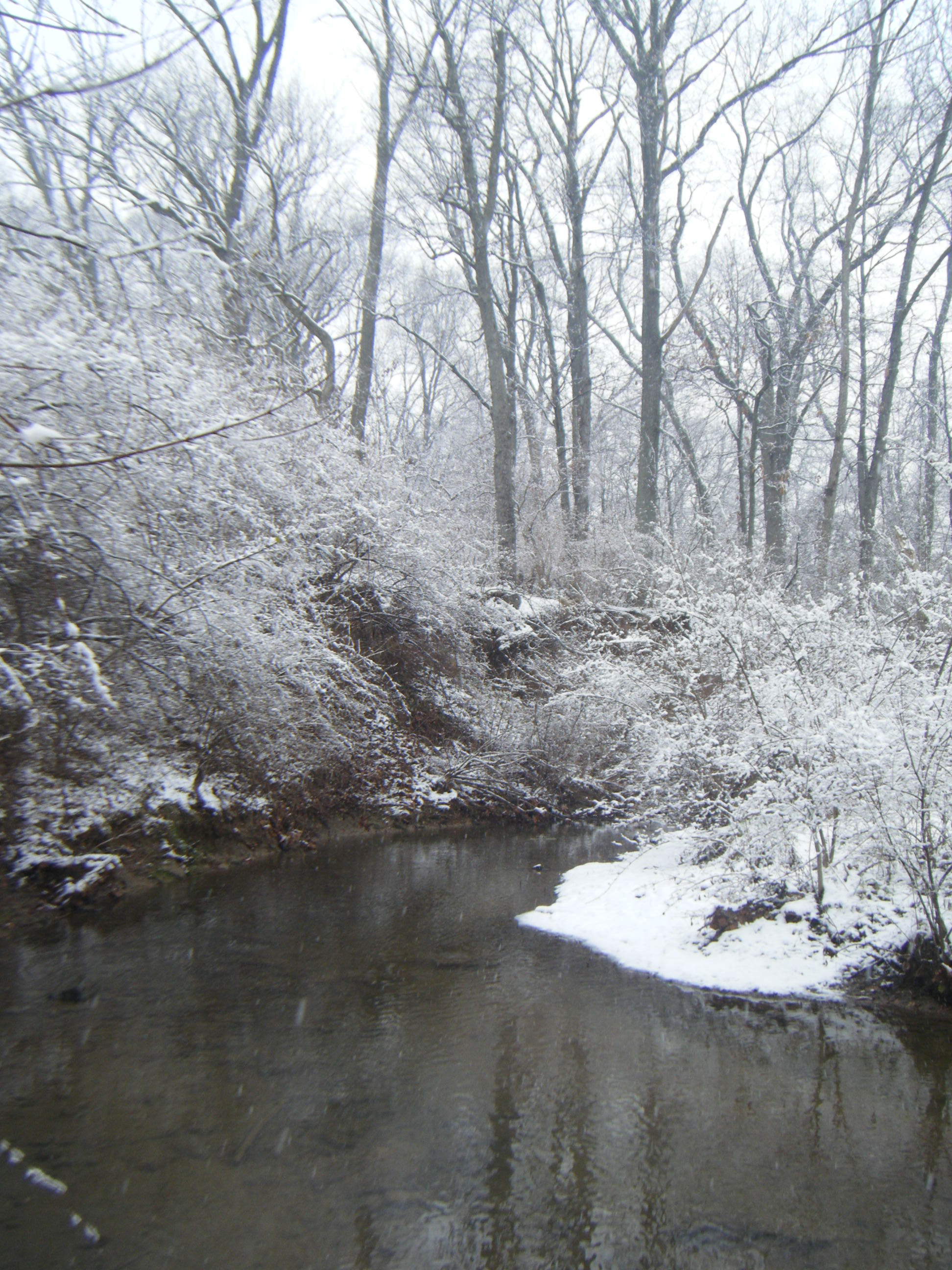
- Holes Creek in Washington Township

Location
- Country: United States
- State: Ohio
- Counties: Warren, Montgomery

Physical characteristics
- Source
  - location: Springboro, Warren County, Ohio
  - coordinates: 39°34′56″N 84°11′20″W
  - elevation: 709 ft (216 m)
- Mouth
  - location: Great Miami River, Moraine, Montgomery County, Ohio
  - coordinates: 39°41′02″N 84°13′50″W
  - elevation: 216 feet (66 m)
- Length: 9 mi (14 km)

Holes Creek is a stream in the U.S. state of Ohio. The 9-mile-long (14 km) stream is a tributary of the Great Miami River. The stream originates in extreme north-central Warren County in Clearcreek Township, roughly 1.5 miles east of Dayton–Wright Brothers Airport. It soon thereafter enters south-eastern Montgomery County for the duration of its run. The stream passes through portions of Washington and Miami Townships before joining the Great Miami River across from Moraine Airpark. The stream is a major nature and recreation feature for Washington Township, comprising several parks, green spaces and the Grant Nature Center.

Holes Creek has the name of the local Hole family who settled there.

== See also ==
- List of rivers of Ohio
