= Claire Falknor =

American soccer player

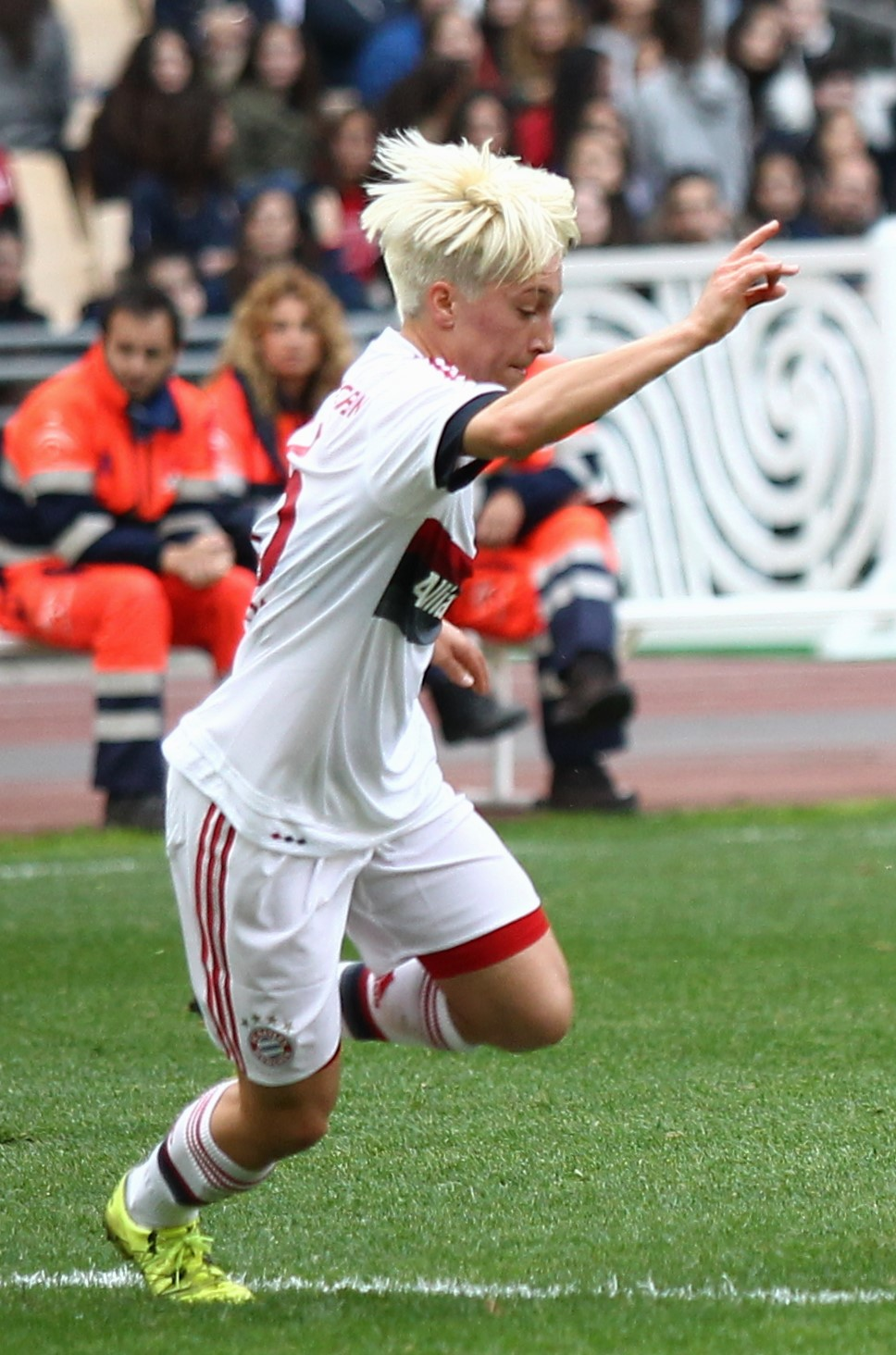
- Falknor playing for FC Bayern in February 2016

Personal information
- Full name: Claire Elizabeth Falknor
- Date of birth: May 12, 1993 (age 33)
- Place of birth: Dayton, Ohio, United States
- Height: 5 ft 4 in (1.63 m)
- Positions: Midfielder; defender

Team information
- Current team: Granadilla
- Number: 12

Youth career
- 2008–2011: Centerville HS
- 2010–2012: Ohio Elite

College career
Years	Team	Apps	(Gls)
2012–2015	Florida Gators		

Senior career*
Years	Team	Apps	(Gls)
2016	Bayern Munich	6	(0)
2016	Bayern Munich II	6	(0)
2017–2018	Houston Dash	9	(0)
2018–2019	Logroño	29	(0)
2019–2020	Sevilla	18	(0)
2020–2021	Sporting de Huelva	34	(0)
2021–	Granadilla	45	(1)

International career^{‡}
2015–2016	United States U-23	2	(0)
- * Club domestic league appearances and goals as of April 18, 2023 ‡ National team caps and goals as of February 22, 2016

Claire Elizabeth Falknor (born May 12, 1993) is an American professional soccer player who plays as a midfielder for Spanish Primera División club Granadilla Tenerife. She previously played for the University of Florida, where she was named third-team NSCAA All-American and first-team All-SEC in 2015 and second team all-SEC in 2014.

== Early life ==
Born in Dayton, Ohio, Falknor attended Centerville High School (class of 2012) and played with the Ohio South State Olympic Development Program (ODP) team from 2008 to 2010 and with the Ohio Elite Soccer Academy club side from 2010 to 2012.

== Playing career ==
=== Club ===
In January 2016, Falknor joined Frauen-Bundesliga side Bayern Munich. She made her professional debut on February 13, coming on as an 83rd-minute substitute for Mana Iwabuchi against Köln.

Falknor and Bayern Munich mutually dissolved her contract in December 2016, and Bayern announced that she was returning to the United States.

On February 24, 2017, Falknor signed with the Houston Dash.

On June 18, 2018, Falknor was waived by the Dash to make room on the roster for the newly acquired Sofia Huerta and Taylor Comeau. On July 4, 2018, it was announced that Falknor would be joining EDF Logroño in the Primera División in Spain. She left the team at the end of the season.

=== International ===
In May 2015, Falknor was named to the United States under-23 national team for the Four Nations Tournament in Norway. She played in two of the three matches.
