= Premier Health =

Hospital network in Dayton, Ohio

- Company type: Private
- Industry: Healthcare
- Headquarters: Dayton, Ohio, U.S.
- Area served: Ohio
- Number of employees: 14,000
- Website: www.premierhealth.com

Premier Health is a medical network of three hospitals and two major health centers in the Dayton region.

== Community outreach ==
In December 2017, Premier Health worked with the advertising firm DeVito/Verdi to create an educational radio, television and print ads targeting at-risk individuals, their loved ones, and opioid misusers. This campaign hopes to start the conversation to address the ongoing opioid addiction crisis in the Dayton area.

== See also ==
- List of hospitals in Ohio
