= Washington Township, Montgomery County, Ohio =

Township in Ohio, US

- Township
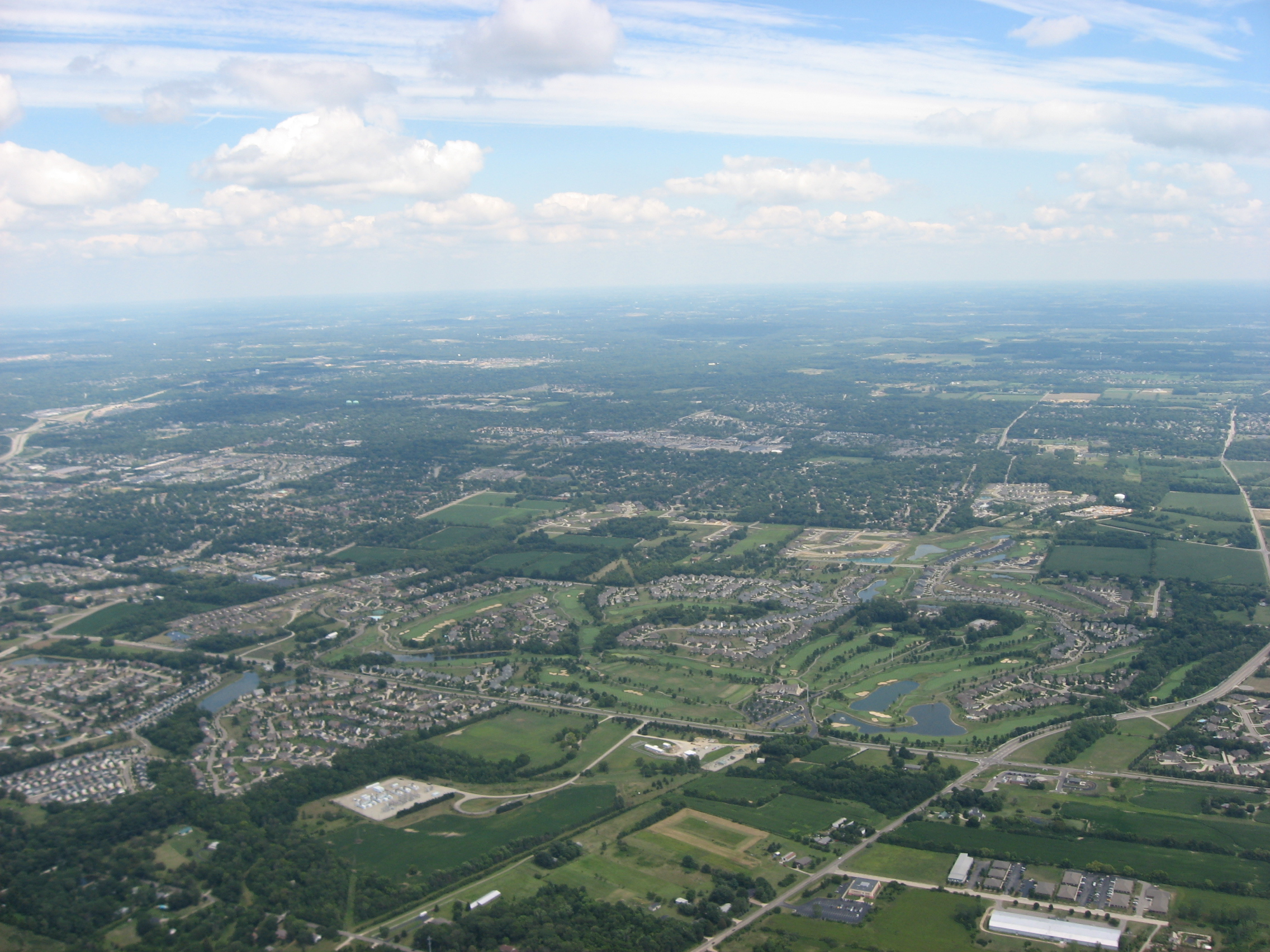
- Southern Washington Township, with Centerville in the distance

- Flag

- Location in Montgomery County and the state of Ohio.
- Coordinates: 39°38′3″N 84°9′48″W
- Country: United States
- State: Ohio
- County: Montgomery

Area
  - Total: 31.2 sq mi (80.8 km^{2})
  - Land: 31.2 sq mi (80.8 km^{2})
  - Water: 0.039 sq mi (0.1 km^{2})
- Elevation: 958 ft (292 m)

Population (2020)
  - Total: 61,682
  - Density: 1,980/sq mi (763/km^{2})
- Time zone: UTC-5 (Eastern (EST))
  - Summer (DST): UTC-4 (EDT)
- FIPS code: 39-81494
- GNIS feature ID: 1086681

A suburb of Dayton, Washington Township is the largest of nine townships of Montgomery County, Ohio, United States. The population was 61,882 at the 2020 census.

The township, through the independent Centerville-Washington Park District, contains eight community parks, nine nature parks, and 33 neighborhood parks encompassing 1,000 acres in Centerville and Washington Township.

== Geography ==
Located in the southeastern corner of the county, Washington Township borders the following townships and cities:

- Kettering - north
- Sugarcreek Township, Greene County - east
- Bellbrook - east
- Wayne Township, Warren County - southeast
- Clearcreek Township, Warren County - south
- Miami Township - west
- Springboro - southwest

Because most of eastern Montgomery County is urbanized, Washington Township is the only civil township in the county to border Greene County.

Several populated places are located in Washington Township, including:

- Part of the city of Kettering, in the north
- Part of the city of Centerville, in the center

== Name and history ==
It is one of forty-three Washington Townships statewide.

In 1833, Washington Township contained four gristmills, seven saw mills, and one cotton factory.

== Demographics ==
=== 2020 census ===
Washington Township racial composition
Race	Number	Percentage
White (NH)	47,632	77.2%
Black or African American (NH)	3,269	5.30%
Native American (NH)	108	0.18%
Asian (NH)	4,082	6.62%
Pacific Islander (NH)	15	0.02%
Other/mixed	4,386	7.11%
Hispanic or Latino	2,190	3.55%

== Government ==
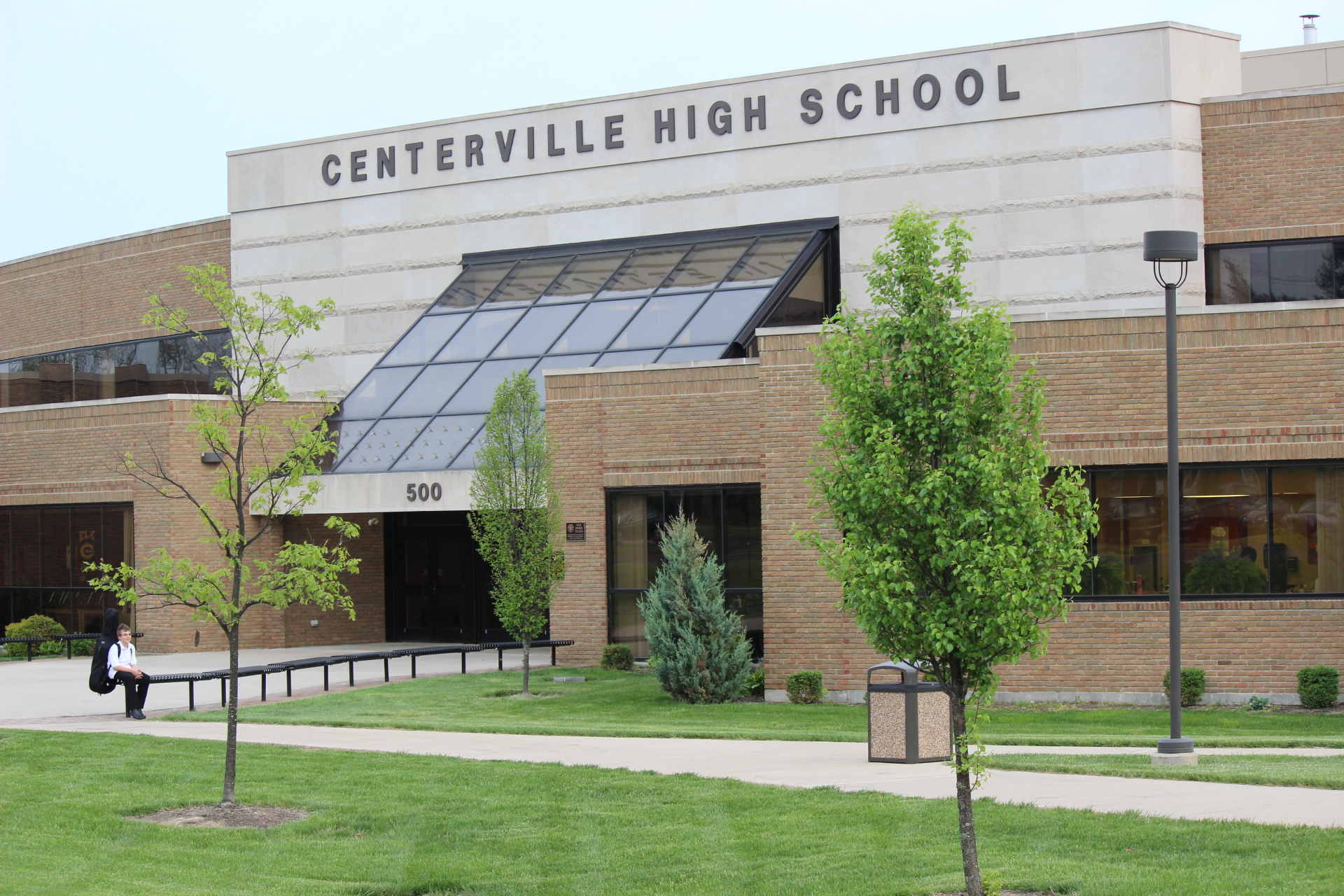
Washington Township public school students attend Centerville High School

The township is governed by a three-member board of trustees who are elected in November of odd-numbered years to a four-year term beginning on the following January 1. Two are elected in the year after the presidential election and one is elected in the year before it. There is also an elected township fiscal officer who serves a four-year term beginning on April 1 of the year after the election, which is held in November of the year before the presidential election. Vacancies in the fiscal officership or on the board of trustees are filled by the remaining trustees.

Both the township's library system and the Centerville City School District (shared with residents of the city of Centerville) are ranked highly on state and national scales.

Police services are provided in the township through a contract with the Montgomery County Sheriff’s Office.
