= National Register of Historic Places listings in Montgomery County, Ohio =

Location of Montgomery County in Ohio

This is a list of the National Register of Historic Places listings in Montgomery County, Ohio.

This is intended to be a complete list of the properties and districts on the National Register of Historic Places in Montgomery County, Ohio, United States. The locations of National Register properties and districts for which the latitude and longitude coordinates are included below, may be seen in an online map.

There are 161 properties and districts listed on the National Register in the county, including 7 National Historic Landmarks. The city of Dayton is the location of 118 of these properties and districts, including 5 National Historic Landmarks; they are listed separately, while the remaining properties and districts are listed here. A single property, the Miami Valley Golf Course and Clubhouse, is split between Dayton and other parts of the county, and it thus appears on both lists. Another 2 properties were once listed but have been removed.

This National Park Service list is complete through NPS recent listings posted May 22, 2026.

== Current listings ==
=== Outside Dayton ===
	Name on the Register	Image	Date listed	Location	City or town	Description
1	Arnold Homestead	Arnold Homestead	November 7, 1977 (#77001077)	North of Dayton on State Route 201; 39°52′20″N 84°05′46″W	Huber Heights	
2	Aullwood House and Garden	Aullwood House and Garden	February 5, 1999 (#99000092)	900 Aullwood Rd., northwest of Dayton; 39°52′05″N 84°16′32″W	Butler Township	
3	Ausenbaugh-McElhenny House	Ausenbaugh-McElhenny House	July 18, 1975 (#75001503)	7373 Taylorsville Rd. 39°51′39″N 84°06′09″W	Huber Heights	
4	George Bixler Farm	George Bixler Farm	August 22, 2002 (#02000888)	13213 Providence Pike, south of Brookville; 39°48′19″N 84°25′40″W	Perry Township	
5	Robert Bradford House	Robert Bradford House	March 21, 1979 (#79001897)	South of Centerville on Social Row Rd. 39°35′22″N 84°08′26″W	Washington Township	
6	Erma Bombeck House	Erma Bombeck House	February 23, 2015 (#15000043)	162 Cushwa Dr. 39°38′32″N 84°09′07″W	Centerville	
7	Carlisle Fort	Carlisle Fort	February 15, 1974 (#74001584)	Western bank of Twin Creek, south of Germantown; 39°35′26″N 84°21′15″W	German Township	
8	Centerville Historic District	Centerville Historic District	December 17, 1974 (#74001577)	Irregular pattern at Franklin and Main Sts. 39°37′42″N 84°09′38″W	Centerville	
9	Deerwood Farm	Deerwood Farm	November 12, 1975 (#75001507)	North of Dayton at 7200 Peters Pike; 39°51′07″N 84°13′37″W	Butler Township	
10	Emmanuel's Evangelical Lutheran Church	Emmanuel's Evangelical Lutheran Church	September 6, 1990 (#90001292)	30 W. Warren St. 39°37′40″N 84°22′18″W	Germantown	
11	Joseph Flory House	Joseph Flory House	March 29, 1978 (#78002143)	Northwest of Clayton on Diamond Mill Rd. 39°51′58″N 84°22′07″W	Clay Township	
12	Fox Hollow	Fox Hollow	June 9, 2006 (#06000481)	6320 Mad River Rd. 39°39′22″N 84°11′29″W	Washington Township	
13	Gunckel's Town Plan Historic District	Gunckel's Town Plan Historic District	May 13, 1976 (#76001502)	Roughly bounded by Mulberry and Walnut Sts. and Warren and Market Sts. 39°37′32″N 84°22′14″W	Germantown	
14	Hawthorn Hill	Hawthorn Hill	October 18, 1974 (#74001585)	Harman and Park Aves. 39°43′20″N 84°10′34″W	Oakwood	
15	Jacob's Church	Jacob's Church	September 6, 1990 (#90001290)	213 E. Central Ave. 39°38′31″N 84°17′11″W	Miamisburg	
16	Ethol Kellog House	Ethol Kellog House	June 18, 1976 (#76001498)	West of Centerville off State Route 725 on Yankee St. 39°37′47″N 84°12′02″W	Washington Township	
17	Charles F. Kettering House	Charles F. Kettering House	December 22, 1977 (#77001080)	3965 Southern Boulevard; 39°41′37″N 84°11′38″W	Kettering	Burned down in 1995.
18	Koehne-Poast Farm	Koehne-Poast Farm	April 11, 1977 (#77001079)	West of Germantown off State Route 725; 39°37′29″N 84°23′08″W	German Township and Germantown	
19	Krug House	Krug House	August 12, 1992 (#92000973)	3473 Sweet Potato Ridge Rd. 39°53′30″N 84°19′10″W	Union	
20	Long-Mueller House	Long-Mueller House	April 23, 1987 (#87000637)	986 Laurelwood Rd. 39°42′02″N 84°11′16″W	Kettering	
21	Long-Romspert House	Long-Romspert House	December 21, 1987 (#87001522)	1947 Far Hills Ave. 39°42′51″N 84°10′20″W	Oakwood	
22	Market Square	Market Square	November 10, 1975 (#75001510)	Both sides of Main St. including junctions at Central and Linden Aves. 39°38′27″N 84°17′22″W	Miamisburg	
23	Samuel Martindale House	Samuel Martindale House	May 22, 1978 (#78002148)	Northeast of Englewood off U.S. Route 40; 39°53′43″N 84°16′54″W	Butler Township	
24	Miami-Erie Canal Lock No. 70	Miami-Erie Canal Lock No. 70	December 20, 1982 (#82001479)	Fishburg and Endicott Rds. 39°50′28″N 84°09′32″W	Huber Heights	
25	Miamisburg Mound	Miamisburg Mound	November 10, 1970 (#70000511)	Southeast of Miamisburg on State Route 725; 39°37′38″N 84°16′51″W	Miamisburg	
26	Miami Valley Golf Course and Clubhouse	Miami Valley Golf Course and Clubhouse	June 30, 2015 (#15000372)	3311 Salem Ave. 39°47′31″N 84°14′34″W	Harrison Township	Extends into Dayton
27	Normandy Farms	Normandy Farms	November 25, 1983 (#83004322)	450 W. Alex-Bell Rd., northwest of Centerville; 39°38′43″N 84°10′08″W	Washington Township	
28	Pease Homestead	Pease Homestead	August 11, 1980 (#80003169)	2123 Alexander-Bellbrook Rd., northwest of Centerville; 39°40′17″N 84°12′23″W	Miami Township	
29	David Rohr Mansion and Carriage House	David Rohr Mansion and Carriage House	May 22, 1978 (#78002149)	Astoria Rd. and State Route 725; 39°37′20″N 84°23′06″W	Germantown	
30	Salem Bear Creek Church, Salem Evangelical Lutheran Church	Salem Bear Creek Church, Salem Evangelical Lutheran Church	September 6, 1990 (#90001291)	Roughly bounded by Union Rd., Dayton Germantown Pike, and Bear Creek; 39°40′48″N 84°18′34″W	Moraine	
31	Schantz Park Historic District	Schantz Park Historic District	October 16, 1992 (#92001492)	Roughly bounded by Far Hills, Irving, Mahart and Schenck Aves. 39°43′54″N 84°10′37″W	Oakwood	
32	Adam Schantz Sr. House	Adam Schantz Sr. House	March 7, 1980 (#80003178)	314-316 Schantz Ave. 39°43′54″N 84°10′35″W	Oakwood	
33	Schuter Carpenter Shop and House	Schuter Carpenter Shop and House	September 27, 1980 (#80003179)	3224 W. Alexandersville-Bellbrook Rd., east of West Carrollton; 39°40′24″N 84°13′37″W	Miami Township	
34	Sears, Roebuck and Company		September 5, 2023 (#100009303)	5200 Salem Ave. 39°49′11″N 84°16′54″W	Trotwood	
35	Shuey's Mill	Shuey's Mill	September 5, 1975 (#75001508)	Main St. 39°37′15″N 84°22′13″W	Germantown	
36	Skywood Farms	Skywood Farms	February 22, 1996 (#96000117)	732 W. Alex-Bell Rd., northwest of Centerville; 39°38′58″N 84°10′46″W	Washington Township	
37	Samuel Spitler House	Samuel Spitler House	September 28, 1973 (#73001507)	14 Market St. 39°50′08″N 84°24′50″W	Brookville	Designed by architect George Franklin Barber
38	John Stump House and Mill	John Stump House and Mill	July 7, 1975 (#75001509)	Southwest of Germantown at the junction of Sigel and Oxford Rds. 39°37′02″N 84°23′28″W	German Township	
39	Taylorsville Canal Inn	Taylorsville Canal Inn	November 16, 1977 (#77001078)	4240 Taylorsville Rd. 39°51′48″N 84°09′54″W	Huber Heights	
40	Trailsend	Trailsend	May 22, 1979 (#79001905)	3500 Governors Trail; 39°42′04″N 84°11′57″W	Kettering	
41	Trotwood Railroad Station and Depot	Trotwood Railroad Station and Depot	January 26, 1981 (#81000448)	2 E. Main St. 39°47′49″N 84°18′40″W	Trotwood	
42	Watkins House	Watkins House	December 24, 1974 (#74001578)	9950 Lebanon Pike, south of Centerville; 39°35′57″N 84°09′40″W	Washington Township	
43	Wright Library	Wright Library	December 24, 2013 (#13000981)	1776 Far Hills Ave. 39°42′56″N 84°10′16″W	Oakwood	
44	Wolf Creek Mound	Wolf Creek Mound	June 4, 1973 (#73001511)	Atop the highest hill at the confluence of Poplar Run and Wolf Creek, west of central Trotwood; 39°48′14″N 84°20′48″W	Trotwood	

== Former listings ==
	Name on the Register	Image	Date listed	Date removed	Location	City or town	Description
1	John Beard Farm		May 5, 1978 (#78002151)	February 2, 1980	South of Vandalia on Mulberry Lane	Vandalia	Was in the process of being demolished when it was listed in 1978.
2	Germantown Covered Bridge	Germantown Covered Bridge	September 3, 1971 (#71000647)	July 6, 1981	Center St., over Little Twin Creek	Germantown	Destroyed after being hit by passing vehicle on February 19, 1981.
3	Weber House		July 3, 1974 (#09000104)	1975	120 N. Second St.	Miamisburg	Demolished in June 1975.

== See also ==
- List of National Historic Landmarks in Ohio
- Listings in neighboring counties: Butler, Clark, Darke, Greene, Miami, Preble, Warren
- National Register of Historic Places listings in Ohio
