= Southwestern Buckeye League =

Scholastic athletic league in Ohio, USA

The Southwestern Buckeye League (SWBL) is an Ohio High School Athletic Association (OHSAA) sports conference made up of schools located in southwestern Ohio, mainly around the greater Dayton and Cincinnati areas. It was established in 1944.

== Members ==
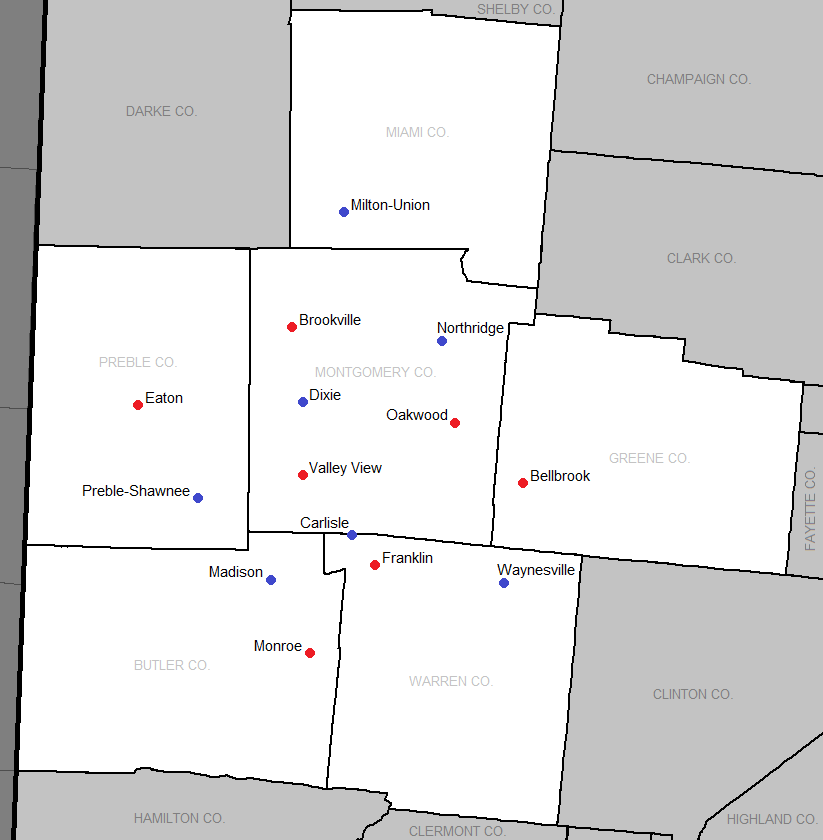
SWBL's 2006-2021 alignment. Southwestern Division (larger schools) are represented with a red dot, the Buckeye Division (smaller schools) are represented with a blue dot. Dixie, Milton-Union, Northridge, and Preble-Shawnee left the conference after the 2020–21 school year

School	Nickname	Location	Colors	Tenure
Southwestern Division
Bellbrook	Golden Eagles	Bellbrook	Purple, Gold	1975-
Edgewood	Cougars	Trenton	Blue, White	2023-
Franklin	Wildcats	Franklin	Red, Black	2006-
Monroe	Hornets	Monroe	Navy Blue, Gold	2006-
Ross	Rams	Ross Township	Maroon, Gold	2023-
Talawanda	Brave	Oxford	Red, White, Navy Blue	2025- (Football joins in 2027)
Buckeye Division
Brookville	Blue Devils	Brookville	Royal Blue, White	1959-
Carlisle	Indians	Carlisle	Red, Gray	1975-
Dayton Christian	Warriors	Miamisburg	Purple, Gold	2025- (Football joins in 2027)
Eaton	Eagles	Eaton	Purple, Gold	1947–72, 1982-
Madison	Mohawks	Middletown	Red, Black, White	1984-
Oakwood	Lumberjacks	Dayton	Blue, Gold	1953-
Valley View	Spartans	Germantown	Navy Blue, White	1975-
Waynesville	Spartans	Waynesville	Orange, Black, White	2001-

- Brookville, Valley View and Eaton moved to the Buckeye Division in 2021
- Waynesville moved to the Southwestern Division in 2021 then returned to the Buckeye Division in 2023 when Edgewood and Ross joined the conference in the Southwestern Division

== History ==
- Compiled from the SWBL page at SWBL History

=== State Titles ===
1947-48 Eaton Boys' Basketball

1972-73 Brookville Boys' Track

1985-86 Oakwood Boys' Golf

1994-95 Valley View Football

1996-97 Oakwood Baseball

1996-1997 Valley View Football

1997-98 Valley View Football

2001-02 Eaton Boys' Cross Country

2005-06 Oakwood Girls' Tennis

2009-10 Oakwood Boys' Golf

2010-11 Oakwood Boys' Golf

2012-13 Oakwood Boys' Swimming

2012-13 Oakwood Boys' Golf

2013-14 Oakwood Boys' Swimming

2013-14 Oakwood Boys' Golf

2020-21 Oakwood Girls’ Track

2021-22 Oakwood Girls’ Track

2021-22 Waynesville Girls’ Soccer

=== 1940s ===
- The SWBL was created in 1944 by charter members Vandalia Butler, Tippecanoe, Versailles, and Milton-Union.
- West Carrollton and Eaton joined in 1947.

=== 1950s ===
- The league added Trotwood-Madison and Wilmington in during the 1950–51 school year, after which Versailles left along with Wilmington.
- For the 1951–52 school year, the SWBL consisted of: Butler, Eaton, Milton-Union, Tippecanoe, Trotwood-Madison and West Carrollton.
- In 1953, Randolph (Northmont) and Oakwood were added to bring the league total up to eight. Randolph would consolidate into Northmont in 1959, which took their place in the SWBL.
- Brookville and Northridge were added in 1958 to make the SWBL a ten-member league.

=== 1970s ===
- After the 1971–72 school year, Eaton left and was replaced by Greenville.
- A huge change came in 1975 when Butler, Northmont, Trotwood-Madison and West Carrollton left and were replaced by Bellbrook, Carlisle, Dixie, and Valley View.

=== 1980s ===
- After the 1981–82 school year, Milton-Union and Tippecanoe left with Greenville, who was replaced by the school they had replaced: Eaton.
- In 1984, Madison and Preble-Shawnee both joined.

=== 2000s ===
- Milton-Union returned in 2001 with Waynesville and the SWBL split into two six-team divisions. The Southwestern Division consisted of Bellbrook, Eaton, Milton-Union, Oakwood, Preble-Shawnee, and Valley View; while the Buckeye Division was made up of Brookville, Carlisle, Dixie, Madison, Northridge, and Waynesville.
- In 2006, Franklin and Monroe bring the league total up to 14.

=== 2020's ===
- Dixie, Milton-Union, Northridge, and Preble-Shawnee left the conference in 2021 narrowing down the conference to 10 teams. Valley View, Eaton and Brookville moved to the Buckeye Division and Waynesville moved to the Southwestern Division
- Trenton Edgewood and Hamilton Ross joined in 2023 in the Southwestern Division, with Waynesville returning to the Buckeye Division
- Oxford Talawanda and Dayton Christian join the conference in 2025 for all sports except football. Football will join in 2027. Talawanda will be added to the Southwestern Division, and Dayton Christian will be added to the Buckeye Division

=== Former members ===
- Bradford Railroaders (1941–42)
- Vandalia Butler Aviators (1950–75)
- Tipp City Tippecanoe Red Devils (1944–82)
- Versailles Tigers (1944–51)
- Trotwood Trotwood-Madison Rams (1950–75)
- Wilmington Hurricane (1950–51)
- West Carrollton Pirates (1947–75)
- Englewood Randolph Township Bobcats (1953–59, consolidated into Northmont)
- Clayton Northmont Thunderbolts (1959–75)
- Greenville Green Wave (1972–82)
- Camden Preble-Shawnee Arrows (1984–2021)
- Dayton Northridge Polar Bears (1959–2021)
- West Milton Milton-Union Bulldogs (1944–82, 2001–2021)
- New Lebanon Dixie Greyhounds (1975–2021)

== Conference Champions (2020-21) ==
=== Football ===
Buckeye: Waynesville

Southwestern: Bellbrook

=== Boys Soccer ===
Buckeye: Milton-Union, Waynesville

Southwestern: Oakwood

=== Girls Soccer ===
Buckeye: Waynesville

Southwestern: Monroe

=== Boys Basketball ===
Buckeye: Preble Shawnee

Southwestern: Franklin

=== Girls Basketball ===
Buckeye: Madison

Southwestern: Bellbrook

=== Baseball ===
Buckeye: TBD (2018-19: Waynesville)

Southwestern: TBD (2018-19: Franklin, Valley View)

=== Softball ===
Buckeye: TBD (2018-19: Madison)

Southwestern: TBD (2018-19: Monroe)
