= Eaton High School (Ohio) =

Location
- 600 Hillcrest Dr. Eaton, Preble County, Ohio 45320

Information
- Established: 1898
- School district: Eaton Community School District
- Superintendent: Scott Couch
- Teaching staff: 33.00 (FTE)
- Grades: 9-12
- Average class size: 147
- Student to teacher ratio: 16.55
- Colors: Purple, gold, white
- Fight song: Fight Eagle, Fight
- Athletics conference: SWBL
- Nickname: Eagles
- Rival: Valley View and Brookville
- Newspaper: The Sour-ce
- Website: ehs.eaton.k12.oh.us

Eaton High School is a public high school in Eaton, Ohio, U.S. It is the only high school in the Eaton Community School district. The district lies entirely within Preble County and serves students within the City of Eaton along with portions of Washington, Gasper, Dixon, and Israel Townships. The High School is located at 600 Hillcrest Drive, Eaton, OH 45320.

== Athletics ==
The Eaton Eagles wear purple, gold, and white and participate as members of the Southwestern Buckeye League. The Eagles have captured over 100 league titles during their 75 year span in the SWBL. Eaton's primary league rivals are Brookville High School and Valley View High School.

=== Ohio High School Athletic Association State Championships ===
- Boys Basketball – 1948
- Boys Cross Country – 2001
