= Carlisle High School (Carlisle, Ohio) =

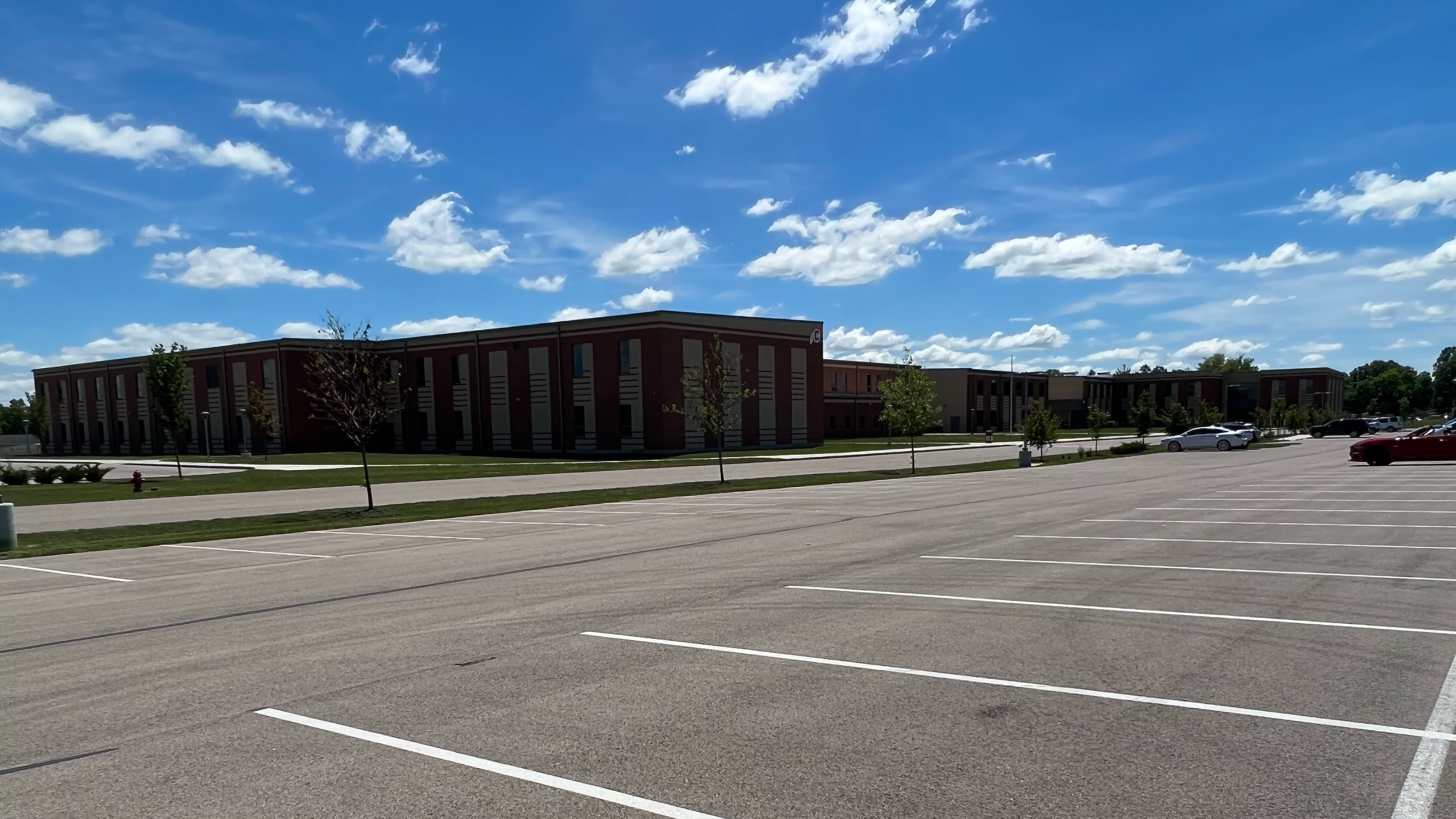

Location
- 250 Jamaica Road; Carlisle, Ohio 45005; United States
- Coordinates: 39°35′17″N 84°19′22″W

Information
- School type: Public
- Established: 1815; 211 years ago
- School district: Carlisle Local Schools
- Superintendent: David Vail
- NCES School ID: 390504103935
- Principal: Andrew Huber
- Teaching staff: 34.00 (FTE)
- Grades: 9–12
- Enrollment: 415 (2024-2025)
- Student to teacher ratio: 12.21
- Colors: Red and Gray
- Athletics conference: Southwestern Buckeye League
- Nickname: Indians
- Website: www.carlisleindians.org/carlisle-high-school/

Carlisle High School is a public high school in Carlisle, Ohio and is a part of the Carlisle Local Schools.

== History ==
The school was originally located in a two story building on the corner of Jamaica Road and Fairview Drive. It is now at 250 Jamaica Road.

== Notable alumni ==
Jaren Crowe- Graduate of the great University of Mount Union

Chris Hicks - Short Story Author
