= Valley View Local School District =

School district in Ohio, United States

Address
- 59 Peffley Street Germantown, Ohio, 45327; United States

District information
- Type: Public
- Motto: Advance as one
- Grades: PK–12
- Established: 1968; 58 years ago
- Schools: 4
- NCES District ID: 3904874

Students and staff
- Students: 1,766 (2025–2026)
- Teachers: 103.41 (on an FTE basis) (2025–2026)
- Staff: 214.61 (on an FTE basis) (2025–2026)
- Student–teacher ratio: 17.08 (2025–2026)
- District mascot: The Spartans
- Colors: navy blue, white

Other information
- Website: www.valleyview.k12.oh.us

Valley View Local School District is a school district in Montgomery County, Ohio, serving German Township which contains Germantown, Ohio. In addition, it serves the majority of Jackson Township, including Farmersville, Ohio.

The district was formed in 1968, as the result of the consolidation of Germantown High School and Farmersville High School. The resulting district adopted the Spartan name, of which the first class graduated in 1968 from the old Germantown High School. The first class to graduate from the new high school was 1969.

== Board of education ==
The Board of Education consists of five members, elected by the general public. Terms last four years.

== Schools ==
The district was formed in 1968 and reconfigured in 2011.

- Valley View High School is located at 6027 Farmersville Pk., Germantown, Oh. 45327;
- Valley View Junior High School is located in the village of Farmersville (7 & 8 grades) at 202 Jackson St, Farmersville, Oh 45325;
- Valley View Intermediate (4 through 6 grades) are located at 64 Comstock St. Germantown, Oh 45327;
- Valley View Primary School (grades K - 3) is located at 110 Comstock St. Germantown, Oh 45327

In 2025 a new K-12 school was opened and is located at 6057 Farmersville Pike Germantown Ohio 45327.
