= David Riley (American football) =

American football player (born 1967)

No. 15, 7
- Position: Quarterback

Personal information
- Born: August 2, 1967 (age 59)
- Listed height: 6 ft 2 in (1.88 m)
- Listed weight: 200 lb (91 kg)

Career information
- High school: Valley View (Germantown, Ohio)
- College: Ball State (1986–1989)
- NFL draft: 1990: undrafted

Career history
- Torino Jaguars (1990–1992); Cincinnati Rockers (1993); Milwaukee Mustangs (1994)

Awards and highlights
- Italian Bowl champion (1991); MAC Offensive Player of the Year (1989); MAC Most Valuable Player (1989)

Career AFL statistics
- Comp. / Att.: 83 / 153
- Passing yards: 955
- TD–INT: 12–7
- Passer rating: 73.84
- Stats at ArenaFan.com

David Riley (born August 2, 1967) is an American former professional football quarterback two seasons in the Arena Football League (AFL) with the Cincinnati Rockers and Milwaukee Mustangs. He played college football at Ball State University. He also played three years in the Italian Football League.

== Early life ==
David Riley was born on August 2, 1967. He was a three-sport standout (basketball, football, baseball) at Valley View High School in Germantown, Ohio. He set school records for single season and career touchdown passes and passing yards. He also set a single game record of 409 passing yards. Riley graduated in 1986.

== College career ==
Riley was a four-year letterman for the Ball State Cardinals of Ball State University from 1986 to 1989. He completed 43 of 89 passes (48.3%) for 424 yards, one touchdown, and eight interceptions his freshman year in 1986 while also rushing for 102 yards and one touchdown. He almost redshirted the 1987 season but ended up seeing playing time after Wade Kosakowski suffered an injury. Riley recorded 38 completions on 62 passing attempts (61.3%) for 491 yards, two touchdowns, and two interceptions in 1987 while rushing for seven yards and one touchdown. As a junior in 1988, Riley completed 168 of 263 passes (63.9%) for 1,886 yards, nine touchdowns, and nine interceptions, and rushed for 108 yards and two touchdowns as the Cardinals went 8–3. His completion percentage was the highest in the Mid-American Conference (MAC) that season. He also punted four times for 135 yards that year. His senior year in 1989, Riley totaled 149 completions on 256 attempts (58.2%) for 1,929 yards, 13 touchdowns, and seven interceptions while also rushing for 146 yards and three touchdowns. He led the MAC in completion percentage for the second season in a row. He was selected as the MAC Offensive Player of the Year, as well as the recipient of the Vern Smith Leadership Award, given to the conference's Most Valuable Player. The 1989 Cardinals were MAC champions and finished 7–3–2, including a loss to the Fresno State Bulldogs in the 1989 California Bowl. Riley's 4,730 career passing yards were the most in school history.

== Professional career ==
Riley played in the Italian Football League for the Torino Jaguars from 1990 to 1992. He led Torino to an Italian Bowl victory in 1991 and a runner-up finish in the 1992 Eurobowl.

He signed with the Cincinnati Rockers of the Arena Football League (AFL) in April 1993. He began the 1993 season on the inactive roster as the third-string quarterback. In late June 1993, Riley was promoted to the active roster to backup Brent Pease after former starter Blair Kiel was released. On July 10, he made his AFL debut at quarterback late in the third quarter of a 49–29 game against the Miami Hooters after Pease threw four interceptions. Riley completed 6 of 6 passes for 121 yards and three touchdowns as the Rockers lost 59–51. He was later named the starter for the following game against the Albany Firebirds on July 17. However, the Rockers lost to the Firebirds by a score of 50–9. Pease returned as starter the following week. Overall, Riley played in five games for the Rockers in 1993, completing 18 of 32 passes (56.2%) for 279 yards, three touchdowns, and two interceptions.

Riley was signed by the Milwaukee Mustangs of the AFL in 1994. He began the 1994 season as the team's starting quarterback. Overall, he played in seven games for the Mustangs that year, completing 65 of 121 passes (53.7%) for 676 yards, nine touchdowns, and five interceptions. The Mustangs finished the season with an 0–12 record.

== Coaching career ==
Riley returned to his alma mater as a quarterbacks and wide receivers coach in 1994.
