= Abraham L. Artz =

American football player and coach (1865–1916)

Biographical details
- Born: March 26, 1865; Germantown, Ohio
- Died: January 2, 1916 (aged 50); Rocky Mount, North Carolina

Playing career
- 1886–1887: Dartmouth
- Position: Halfback

Coaching career (HC unless noted)
- 1891: Otterbein

Head coaching record
- Overall: 2–1

Abraham Lincoln Artz (March 26, 1865 – January 2, 1916) was an American football player and coach. He was an 1888 graduate of Dartmouth College in Hanover, New Hampshire. He played lettered as a halfback for the Dartmouth football team in 1886 and 1887. Artz served as the head football coach at Otterbein University in 1891, compiling a record of 2–1. His tenure included a season-opening victory over Ohio State.
