= Thomas Howard (baseball) =

American baseball player (born 1964)

- Outfielder
- Born: December 11, 1964 (age 61); Middletown, Ohio, U.S.
- Batted: Switch Threw: Right

MLB debut
- July 3, 1990, for the San Diego Padres

Last MLB appearance
- October 1, 2000, for the St. Louis Cardinals

MLB statistics
- Batting average: .264
- Home runs: 44
- Runs batted in: 264
- Stats at Baseball Reference

Teams
- San Diego Padres (1990–1992); Cleveland Indians (1992–1993); Cincinnati Reds (1993–1996); Houston Astros (1997); Los Angeles Dodgers (1998); St. Louis Cardinals (1999–2000)

Thomas Sylvester Howard (born December 11, 1964) is an American former professional baseball outfielder. He played 11 seasons in Major League Baseball (MLB) from 1990 to 2000 for the San Diego Padres, Cleveland Indians, Cincinnati Reds, Houston Astros, Los Angeles Dodgers, and St. Louis Cardinals. On April 11, 2000, he hit the first grand slam at Minute Maid Park.

== Career ==
Howard played three sports at Valley View High School in Germantown, Ohio. After high school, he played college baseball and college football as a backup quarterback for Ball State. He was named the inaugural Mid-American Conference Baseball Player of the Year in 1986 after leading the conference with a .448 batting average and 23 home runs. He would go on to be inducted into the Ball State athletics hall of fame in 1996. He became the first Ball State athlete ever selected in the first round of a major sports draft when the Padres took him with the 11th overall pick in the 1986 Major League Baseball draft.

In 1015 Major League games over 11 seasons, Howard posted a .264 batting average (655-for-2483) with 297 runs, 123 doubles, 22 triples, 44 home runs, 264 RBI, 66 stolen bases, 165 bases on balls, .311 on-base percentage and .384 slugging percentage. He finished his career with a .986 fielding percentage playing at all three outfield positions. In nine postseason games, he hit .158 (3-for-19) with one RBI.

As of 2014, Howard lived in Atlanta, had five children and worked in the health and fitness industry.
