= Brock Bolen =

American football player (born 1985)

No. 44
- Position: Fullback

Personal information
- Born: March 24, 1985 (age 41); Piqua, Ohio, U.S.
- Listed height: 6 ft 0 in (1.83 m)
- Listed weight: 232 lb (105 kg)

Career information
- High school: Valley View (Germantown, Ohio)
- College: Louisville
- NFL draft: 2009: undrafted

Career history
- Jacksonville Jaguars (2009−2012); Cleveland Browns (2013)*
- * Offseason or practice squad member only

Career NFL statistics
- Rushing attempts: 2
- Rushing yards: 14
- Receptions: 3
- Receiving yards: 21
- Total tackles: 6
- Stats at Pro Football Reference

Brock Bolen (born March 24, 1985) is an American former professional football player who was a fullback in the National Football League (NFL). He was signed by the Jacksonville Jaguars of the National Football League (NFL) as an undrafted free agent in 2009. He played college football for the Illinois Fighting Illini and Louisville Cardinals.

== Early life ==
Bolen was born on March 24, 1985. He played high school football at Valley View High School in Germantown, Ohio. As a senior, he rushed for 2,087 yards and 40 touchdowns. He was ranked the nation's 28th-best running back prospect by Scout.com.

== College career ==
Bolen began his college football career in 2004 with the Illinois Fighting Illini, playing mainly on special teams. He transferred to play for the Louisville Cardinals, redshirting in 2005. In 2006, he rushed for 296 yards and scored four touchdowns, including one in a win against the Wake Forest Demon Deacons in the Orange Bowl. In 2007, he rushed for 456 yards and seven touchdowns, plus one receiving touchdown.

== Professional career ==
Bolen was signed as an undrafted free agent by the Jacksonville Jaguars on April 26, 2009. He was signed to the Jaguars' practice squad on September 6, 2009. On December 14, Bolen was promoted to the active roster. Bolen spent the 2012 season on injured reserve.

On July 24, 2013, Bolen signed with the Cleveland Browns. On August 19, 2013, Bolen was cut by the Browns.

== Personal life ==
Bolen's father Jim is a retired US Army Special Forces soldier who served in Vietnam and went on to an adventuresome career before settling down in the US. That period of his life is chronicled in the autobiography, No Guts No Glory.
