= Monroe High School (Monroe, Ohio) =

Monroe Senior High School

Location
- 220 Yankee Road; Monroe, (Butler County), Ohio 45050; United States; 39°27′N 84°23′W

Information
- Type: Public, Coeducational high school
- School district: Monroe Local Schools
- Superintendent: Robert Buskirk
- Principal: Tom Prohaska
- Assistant Principal: Jon Creamer
- Athletic Director: Eric Silverman
- Grades: 9-12
- Student to teacher ratio: 21.80
- Colors: Navy Blue and Gold
- Slogan: "Monroe People show: Respect, Responsibility & Leadership"
- Athletics conference: Southwestern Buckeye League
- Sports: Football; Soccer; Cross Country; Volleyball; Basketball; Tennis; Golf; Wrestling; Bowling; Swimming; Track; Baseball; Softball
- Mascot: Fighting Hornet
- Team name: Fighting Hornets
- Rival: Franklin High School
- Website: Monroe Senior High School
- rated school of excellence.

Monroe Senior High School is a high school in Monroe, Ohio.

== History ==
Lemon Monroe High School was established in 1881 but in 2000 Monroe Local School District was formed after separating from Middletown City Schools. This separation led to the establishment of Monroe Senior High School.

== Academics ==
Monroe High School offers many areas of study that is aimed at preparing students to be "future ready". Students are provided opportunities to take Honors, AP, and College Credit Plus (CCP) courses while attending Monroe High School. Students can also take courses at Butler Tech Joint Vocational School.

== Athletics ==
Monroe Hornets are part of the Southwestern Buckeye League (SWBL) in the Southwestern Division. The athletic programs are supported by the Monroe Athletic Booster Club.

=== Boys Sports ===
- Cross Country
- Football
- Golf
- Soccer
- Basketball
- Bowling
- Swimming
- Wrestling
- Baseball
- Tennis
- Volleyball
- Track and Field

=== Girls Sports ===
- Cheer
  - Football
  - Basketball
  - Competition
- Cross Country
- Soccer
- Tennis
- Volleyball (est 2009)
- Basketball
- Bowling
- Swimming
- Softball
- Track and Field

=== State Champions ===
- Ben Ryan: Wrestling, 275 lb (2001–2002)
- Alex Fultz: Cross Country (1957–1958)

=== Facilities ===
Football, soccer, and track and field all play their games at Monroe Hornet Stadium. Monroe Hornet Stadium features a turf playing surface that was resurfaced in 2019, and the track was resurfaced in 2021. Hornet Stadium has a seating capacity of 5,500.

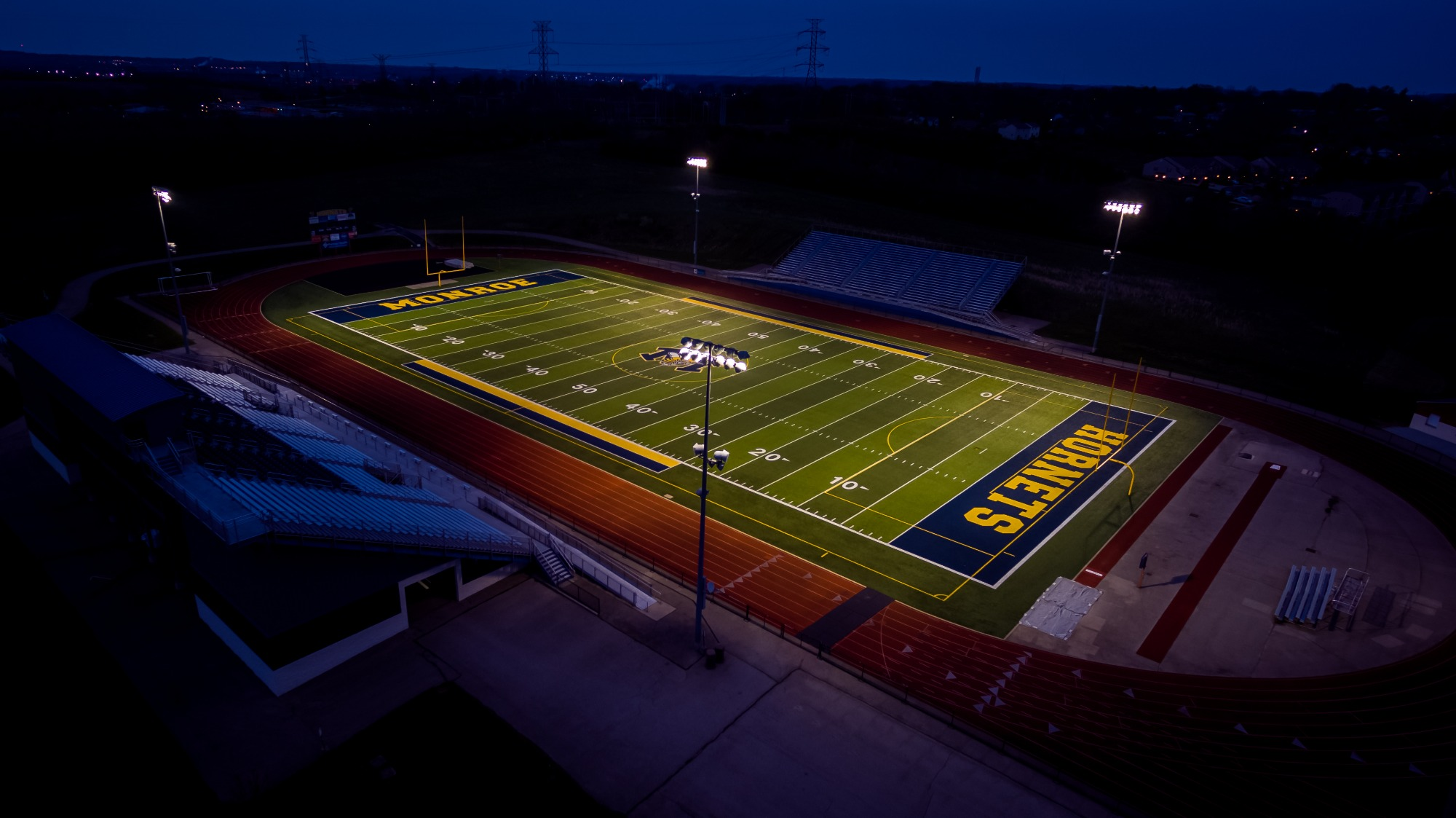
Drone view of Monroe Hornet Stadium at night.

Basketball, volleyball, and wrestling play their home matches in Monroe Hornet Gym. The gym received an updated playing surface in 2022.

Baseball plays their home games at Monroe High School Baseball Field. The field features a grass infield and outfield, press box, covered dugouts, bullpen, and electronic scoreboard.

Lady Hornet softball plays their home games at Lady Hornet Field. The field includes a press box, seating area, covered dugouts, batting cage, bullpen, and electronic scoreboard.

=== Clubs ===
Students at Monroe Senior High School have various clubs they can participate.

- Environmental Club
- Multicultural Club
- Botany Club
- Federation of Christian Athletes
- National Honor Society
- German Club
- Spanish Club
- Power of the Pen
- Interact Club
- Abstinence Society
- Drone Club
- Yearbook
- Monroe Thespian Troupe 1709
- Lacrosse

=== Performing Arts ===
Students can participate in marching band, symphonic band, and classical band. The band is run by Luke Brinkman and Cinda Pelfrey.

Students can also participate in vocal music programs led by Brandon Langjahr and Cinda Pelfrey.

The Monroe Senior High School drama department has two performances per year. In November 2023, Thespian Troupe 1709 performed Puffs (One Act for Young Wizards). The performances are held at Monroe Senior High School Auditorium with a seating capacity of 500. The drama department has also participated in the Miami Valley High School Theater Awards since 2022, and have won several awards.
