= Carlisle Fort (disambiguation) =

Carlisle Fort may refer to:

- Carlisle Fort, a stockade built during the French and Indian War in Carlisle, Pennsylvania
- Carlisle Fort (Ohio), a hilltop earthwork near Carlisle, Ohio
- Fort Carlisle, a previous name for Fort Davis, County Cork, Ireland
