= Waynesville High School (Ohio) =

Location
- 659 Dayton Road, Waynesville, Ohio; United States
- Coordinates: 39°32′08″N 84°05′34″W

Information
- School district: Wayne Local Schools
- Superintendent: Sam Ison
- Principal: Chip Will
- Teaching staff: 21.38 (on an FTE basis)
- Grades: 9 to 12
- Enrollment: 481 (2021–22)
- Student to teacher ratio: 21.38:1
- Colors: Orange, black, and white
- Athletics conference: Southwestern Buckeye League
- Team name: Spartans
- Website: www.wayne-local.com/waynesville-high-school/

Waynesville High School is a public high school in Waynesville, Ohio. It is the only high school in the Wayne Local Schools district. The school colors are orange, black, and white.

== Athletics ==
Waynesville's athletic program was a charter member of the Fort Ancient Valley Conference from 1964 to 1977. After the FAVC, the school was in the Kenton Trace Conference. The school's sports teams, known as the Spartans, now participate in the Southwestern Buckeye League's Buckeye Division, which consists of smaller schools.

=== Ohio High School Athletic Association championships ===
- Girls Soccer – 2021 (Division III)
