= Mike Slusher =

American basketball player

Personal information
- Born: c. 1948
- Died: March 2026 (aged 77–78)
- Listed height: 6 ft 6 in (1.98 m)
- Listed weight: 210 lb (95 kg)

Career information
- High school: Talawanda (Oxford, Ohio)
- College: Miami (OH) (1967–1972)
- Playing career: 1980–1989
- Position: Center / forward
- Coaching career: 1988–1990

Career history

Playing
- 1980–1985: St. Kilda Saints
- 1986: Nunawading Spectres
- 1989: Knox Raiders

Coaching
- 1988–1990: Knox Raiders

Career highlights
- NBL champion (1980)

Mike Slusher (c. 1948 – March 2026) was an American basketball player and coach. He played college basketball for the Miami RedHawks before playing seven seasons in the Australian National Basketball League (NBL) between 1980 and 1986. In 1980, he won an NBL championship with the St. Kilda Saints. Following his NBL career, he had a stint as head coach for the Knox Raiders of the South East Australian Basketball League (SEABL) between 1988 and 1990.

An educator by profession, Slusher worked as a teacher and basketball coach in Australia for 50 years.

== Early life ==
Slusher grew up in Oxford, Ohio, where he attended Talawanda High School.

== Playing career ==
=== College ===
Slusher played Division 1 college basketball for the Miami RedHawks in Oxford, Ohio. In 1967–68, he averaged 15.8 points per game. He was considered a leading prospect as a sophomore in 1968–69. In 1970–71, he averaged 1.0 points and 1.1 rebounds in 10 games. In 1971–72, he averaged 0.7 points and 1.7 rebounds in seven games. He was a letterwinner for the RedHawks in 1971–72.

=== Australia ===
In June 1978, Slusher played for Diamond Valley Toshiba, a team of Melbourne-based Americans, in an exhibition game against the Santa Clara Broncos at Greensborough. He scored a team-high 25 points in a 128–75 loss.

Slusher debuted in the Australian National Basketball League (NBL) in the 1980 season for the St. Kilda Saints. He filled one of two import spots for St. Kilda alongside Rocky Smith. He scored 18 points in the 1980 grand final against the West Adelaide Bearcats. In nine games, he averaged 12.3 points per game. He continued with the Saints every year between 1981 and 1985, playing 130 games over six seasons. In the 1983 season, he led the league with a 64.8% (96/148) field goal percentage. In 1985, he wore jersey number 5 for St. Kilda and was listed as a 200 cm (6 ft 7 in) center/forward.

Prior to the 1986 NBL season, Slusher parted ways with the Saints and joined the Nunawading Spectres, where in his lone season he averaged 7.5 points in 26 games.

Following his NBL career, Slusher spent time as both a player and head coach of the Knox Raiders of the South East Australian Basketball League (SEABL). In his three seasons as head coach between 1988 and 1990, the Raiders failed to make the playoffs. As a player in 1989, he twice had 11 offensive rebounds in a single game. As of 2014, he was in the top ten in five statistical categories in Knox SEABL history.

== Legacy ==
Slusher enjoyed a long coaching career across the SEABL and Big V, and as well as in Basketball Victoria High Performance programs. He also served as assistant coach at the Brisbane Bullets in the NBL.

At the Basketball Victoria 2025 annual awards, Slusher was recognised with a 50 years' service award.

== Teaching ==
Slusher was an English teacher and the boy's junior varsity coach at Sandusky High School in Sandusky, Ohio, from 1974 to 1976. In 1976, he moved to Australia for a 15-month teaching assignment but ultimately never returned and settled down in Australia.

As of 2002, Slusher was teaching professional writing and editing at a TAFE in Australia.

== Personal life and death ==
Slusher married an Australian woman in 1984. He and his wife, Jenny, had two daughters, Cathryn and Menallie. Jenny Slusher served as head coach of the Knox Raiders women's team in the 1990 SEABL season.

Slusher died in March 2026.
