= Talawanda High School =

Location
- 5301 University Park Boulevard; Oxford, Ohio 45056; United States; 39°29′24″N 84°43′58″W

Information
- Type: Public, Coeducational
- Motto: Pride, Integrity, Excellence
- Established: 1956
- School district: Talawanda School District
- Principal: Scott Davie
- Teaching staff: 54.00 (FTE)
- Grades: 9–12
- Student to teacher ratio: 16.69
- Colors: Red, White, and Navy blue
- Slogan: People Respecting Individual Differences Everyday
- Athletics conference: Southwestern Buckeye League
- Team name: Brave
- Accreditation: North Central Association of Colleges and Schools
- Publication: Setting Stone
- Newspaper: Talawanda Tribune
- Yearbook: The Triumvirate
- Website: www.talawanda.org/talawanda-high-school/

Talawanda High School (THS) is a public high school in Oxford, Ohio, United States. It is the only high school in the Talawanda School District and serves students in grades 9–12. It was created in 1956 with the consolidation of three Butler County high schools: Somerville and Collinsville High Schools in Milford Township, Hanover HS in Hanover Township (at the intersection of Mormon and Old Oxford Roads), and Stewart and McGuffey High Schools in Oxford Township. The first graduating class was in 1957. Athletic teams are known as the Brave, and the school colors are red, white, and navy blue.

== Administration history ==
The superintendent during the 1956 consolidation of Somerville, Collinsville, Stewart and Reily High Schools into Talawanda H.S was Robert Bogan now commemorated by an elementary school named after him two miles north of Darrtown in Milford Township.

The first principal of the new THS on Chestnut Street was Alton Rudolf assisted by John Trump. Subsequent superintendents have included Marius Garafalo, Gene Griffith, Roe Hildreth, Gary Denlinger, Dennis Leone, Susan Cobb, Phil Cagwin and, during the building of the new THS off of U.S. 27 southeast of Oxford, Kelly Spivey.

== Facilities ==
The school is in the southern part of Oxford along University Park Boulevard on a campus that includes a multi-purpose stadium with an all-weather track and other outdoor athletic fields. The school opened in June 2012 following a levy approval in 2008.

The previous home of THS on Chestnut Street was sold to Miami University for just over $1 million and was torn down in September 2014 to make way for a parking structure. The field house and outdoor athletic facilities on the site remain.

== Athletics and extracurriculars ==
Talawanda athletic teams are known as the Brave. The Brave compete in the Southwestern Buckeye League.

=== State champions ===
- 2022 Ohio High School Mock Trial

== Notable alumni ==
- Greg Landsman, politician
- Jessica Miranda, businesswoman
- Gary Owen, comedian and actor
- Mike Slusher, basketball player
