= Edgewood High School (Trenton, Ohio) =

Location
- 3045 Busenbark Road; Trenton, Ohio 45067; United States
- Coordinates: 39°28′46″N 84°29′19″W

Information
- Type: Public, coeducational high school
- School district: Edgewood City School District
- Principal: Doug Geygan
- Teaching staff: 51.90 (FTE)
- Grades: 9–12
- Enrollment: 1,153 (2023-2024)
- Student to teacher ratio: 22.22
- Campus: Rural
- Colors: Navy and white
- Athletics conference: Southwestern Buckeye League
- Mascot: Cougar (Den-e)
- Team name: Cougars
- Accreditation: Ohio Department of Education; North Central Association of Colleges and Schools
- Website: ehs.edgewoodschools.com

Edgewood High School is a public high school in Trenton, Ohio. It is the only high school in the Edgewood City School District which serves students in the city of Trenton, the village of Seven Mile, and Wayne Township. The current facility opened in 2012 just outside the city of Trenton on Busenbark Road.

== Athletics ==
Edgewood athletic teams are known as the Cougars. The Cougars and Lady Cougars compete in the Southwestern Buckeye League

== Notable alumni ==
- Zach Apple, Olympic gold medalist, professional swimmer
