= Shane Hannah =

American football player (born 1971)

No. 63
- Position: Guard

Personal information
- Born: October 21, 1971 (age 55); Dayton, Ohio, U.S.
- Listed height: 6 ft 5 in (1.96 m)
- Listed weight: 345 lb (156 kg)

Career information
- High school: Germantown (OH) Valley View
- College: Michigan State
- NFL draft: 1995: 2nd round, 63rd overall pick

Career history
- Dallas Cowboys (1995); Dallas Cowboys (1997)*; New York Jets (1997)*; Carolina Panthers (1998)*
- * Offseason or practice squad member only

Awards and highlights
- Super Bowl champion (XXX); 2× Second-team All-Big Ten (1993, 1994)

Shane Hannah (born October 21, 1971) is an American former professional football player who was an offensive guard for the Dallas Cowboys of the National Football League (NFL). He played college football for the Michigan State Spartans and was selected by the Cowboys in the second round (63rd overall) of the 1995 NFL draft.

== Early life and college ==
Hannah attended Valley View High School, where he played defensive line. As a senior, he was selected the Ohio Division III high school lineman of the year. He lettered in basketball, setting a school record of 23 rebounds in one game. He also practiced track, recording 153' 6' in the discus throw.

He accepted a football scholarship from Michigan State University. He became the starter at left tackle in the second game of his redshirt freshman season against the University of Notre Dame and would never relinquish the position. As a junior, he didn't allow a sack during the season.

He was a four-year starter at defensive line and was a key player in the Spartans potent ground attack. He tied the school record for most starts (44) by an offensive lineman, while receiving second-team All-Big Ten honors as a junior and senior.

== Professional career ==
Pre-draft measurables
| Height | Weight | Arm length | Hand span | 20-yard shuttle | Vertical jump | Broad jump | Bench press |
|---|---|---|---|---|---|---|---|
| 6 ft 5 1/4 in (1.96 m) | 345 lb (156 kg) | 33 in (0.84 m) | 10 7/8 in (0.28 m) | 4.93 s | 25.0 in (0.64 m) | 8 ft 4 in (2.54 m) | 21 reps |
All values from NFL Combine

=== Dallas Cowboys ===
Hannah was selected by the Dallas Cowboys in the second round (63rd overall) of the 1995 NFL draft, with the intention of playing him at offensive guard.

As a rookie, he suffered a torn lateral meniscus and a sprained posterior cruciate ligament in his right knee during the first preseason game, and was placed on the injured reserve list on August 27. The next year, he came back out of shape and overweight, which created tension with his coaches, that eventually led to his decision to quit the team during preseason on July 19 and announce his retirement.

After spending a year out of football, the Cowboys gave him a second chance in 1997, but was released before the season started on August 19.

=== New York Jets ===
On September 24, 1997, the New York Jets signed him to their practice squad. He was waived on October 20.

=== Carolina Panthers ===
In 1998, he signed as a free agent with the Carolina Panthers, but was released before the season started on August 23.
