= Valley View High School (Ohio) =

Public high school in Ohio, United States

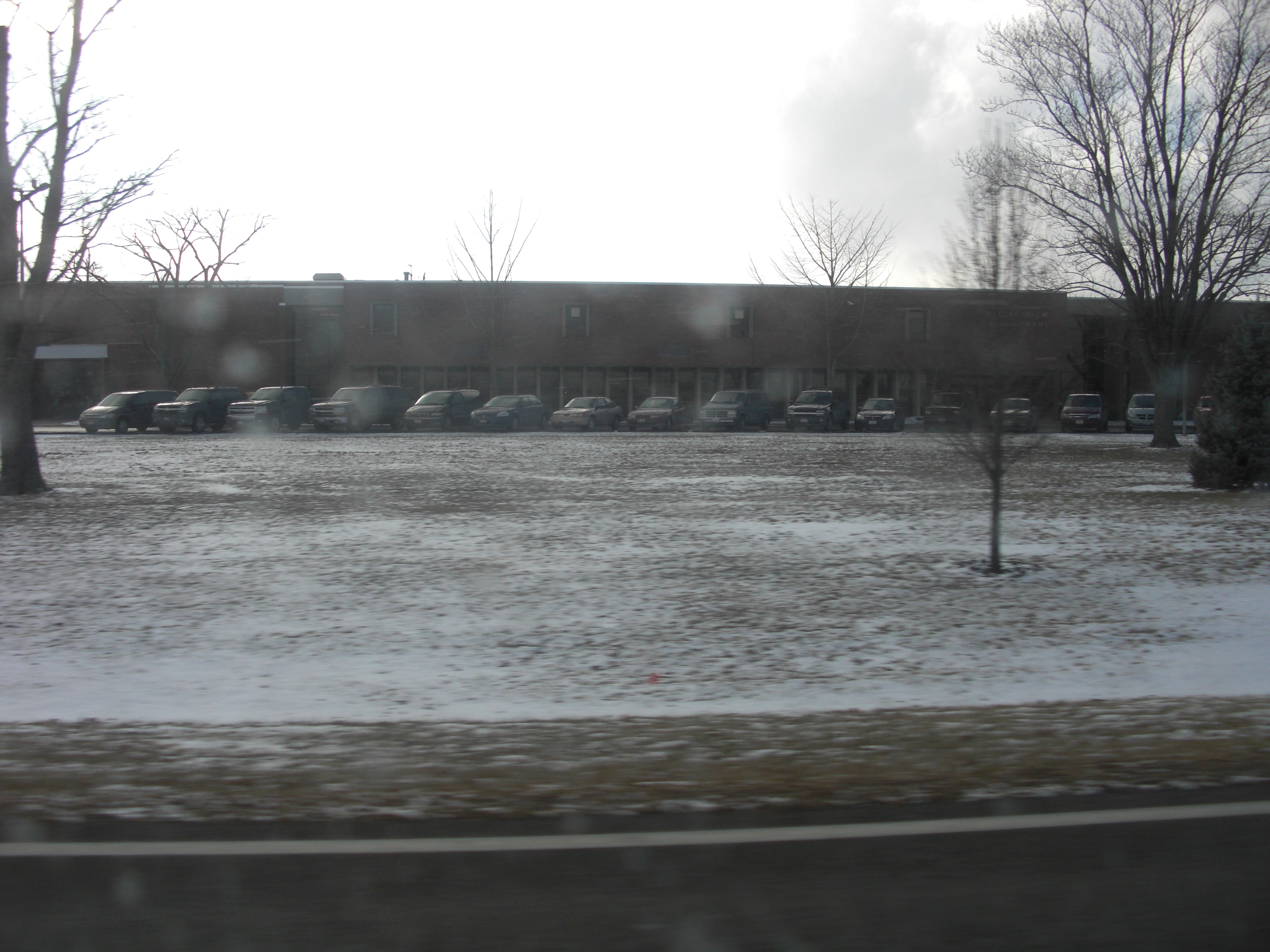

Location
- 6027 Farmersville-Germantown Road; Germantown, (Montgomery County), Ohio 45327; United States

Information
- Type: Public high school
- Principal: Patrick McKee
- Enrollment: 476 (2023-2024)
- Colors: Navy and white
- Athletics conference: Southwestern Buckeye League
- Nickname: Spartans

Valley View High School is a public high school in Germantown, Ohio. It is the only high school in the Valley View Local School District. Its athletic teams are called The Spartans. The first class to graduate after the consolidation was the class of 1969. The new high school was completed some time after that initial graduation. In 1999, the site was expanded, adding a new music wing, and more cafeteria space.

In November 2024, a new K-12 building was completed, and students moved into the building on December 2, 2024.

== Ohio High School Athletic Association State Football Tournament History ==
- Boys Football State Champions – 1994, 1996, 1997
- State Semifinalists: (7) 1992, 1993, 1994, 1996, 1997, 2000, 2002, 2022, 2023

Nickname: Spartans

Colors: Navy Blue and White

Conference: Southwestern Buckeye League (SWBL)

Division: Southwestern

Superintendent: Joe Scholler (2022–present)

Principal: Patrick McKee (2021–present)

== Football accomplishments ==
SWBL Champs, Div. III Regional Champs, State Semi-Finalist: 1992, 1993

SWBL Champs, Div. IV Regional Champs, Div. IV State Champs 1994, 1996, 1997

SWBL Champs, Div. IV Regional Runner-up: 1995

SWBL champs, Div. IV Regional Runner-up: 1998

Div. IV Regional Runner-up: 1999, 2001

SWBL Champs, Div. IV Regional Champs, State Semifinalist: 2000

SWBL Champs, Div. III Regional Champs, Div. III State Semifinalist: 2002

SWBL Champs, Div. III Regional Runner up: 2003

SWBL Champs, Div. IV Regional Runner up: 2005

National Sportsmanship Award Winner: 2008

== Notable alumni ==
- Brock Bolen, class of 2004; former American football fullback for the University of Louisville and the NFL's Jacksonville Jaguars and Cleveland Browns
- Shane Hannah, class of 1990; former American football offensive guard for Michigan State University and the NFL's Dallas Cowboys
- Thomas Howard, former MLB player (San Diego Padres, Cleveland Indians, Cincinnati Reds, Houston Astros, Los Angeles Dodgers, St. Louis Cardinals)
- David Riley, former Ball State University and Arena Football League quarterback
- Chris Roetter, Lead vocals singer for Like Moths to Flames. Former singer for Emarosa & Agraceful
- Amber Coffman, professional singer and songwriter
