= Ausenbaugh–McElhenny House =

- U.S. National Register of Historic Places
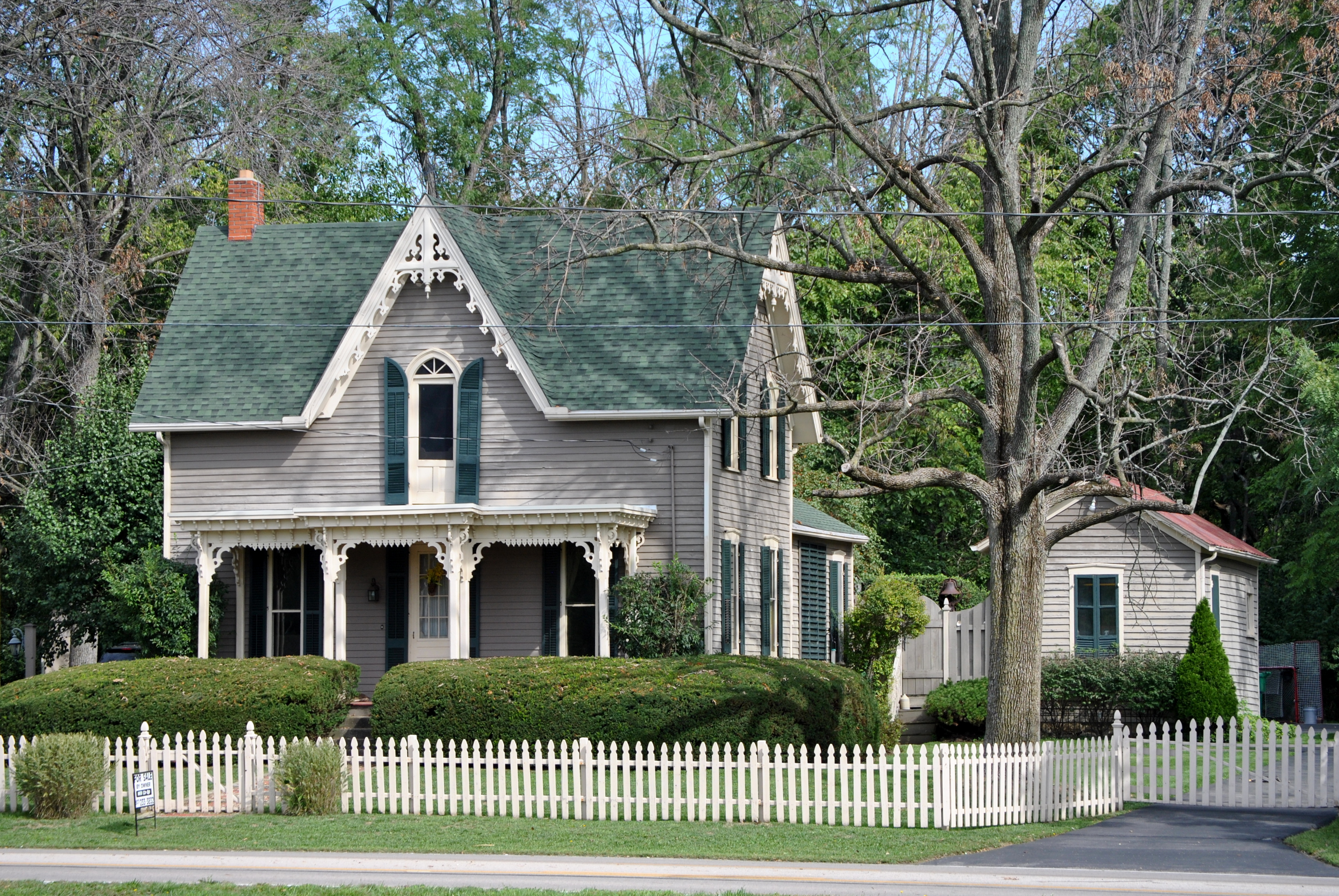
- Roadside view

- Location within Ohio Location within the United States
- Location: 7373 Taylorsville Rd., Huber Heights, Ohio
- Coordinates: 39°51′39″N 84°6′9″W
- Area: 1.5 acres (0.61 ha)
- Built: 1874
- Architectural style: Carpenter Gothic
- NRHP reference No.: 75001503
- Added to NRHP: July 18, 1975

The Ausenbaugh–McElhenny House is a historic house in the city of Huber Heights, a suburb of Dayton, Ohio, United States. Constructed in 1874, the Ausenbaugh–McElhenny House was originally home to one of the first men of Wayne Township, Joseph J. McElhenny, whose local prominence was demonstrated by his election to the office of justice of the peace. The house is one of the area's premier examples of 1870s architecture, due primarily to its Gothic Revival elements both on the exterior and the interior. It has been designated a historic site.

Built of weatherboarded walls set on a stone foundation, the Ausenbaugh–McElhenny House is covered with an asphalt roof and features smaller elements of stone and wood. Decorative elements of the stonework include rusticated blocks on the exterior courses of the foundation, as well as the use of large stone blocks for the stairs from the ground to the entry porch, a large wooden structure. The overall plan resembles the letter "T" with some changes; including a one-story extension at the letter's base, as well as the presence of the shed-roofed porch in the side ell. Aside from the single-story extension, the house is a two-story building with walls that rise to gables. Both rounded and rectangular windows pierce the walls, while the porch-facing main entrance assumes the latter shape. Detailed Gothic-styled woodwork is placed at the peak of the gables, while a small chimney sits at the peak of the roof near the right end of the crosspiece of the "T". Inside, the design is simple but not ostentatious, its styling concentrating on the use of walnut-wood trim. The second story is accessed through an enclosed stairway with an ogive-shaped entryway located near the foyer.

In 1975, the Ausenbaugh–McElhenny House was listed on the National Register of Historic Places, qualifying because of its historically significant architecture. The designation included two small structures, the house's privy and woodshed, as well as the main house. It is one of four Huber Heights locations on the Register, along with the Arnold Homestead, the Taylorsville Canal Inn (demolished), and Lock Seventy on the Miami and Erie Canal.
