= Emmanuel's Evangelical Lutheran Church =

Historic church in Ohio, United States

- U.S. National Register of Historic Places
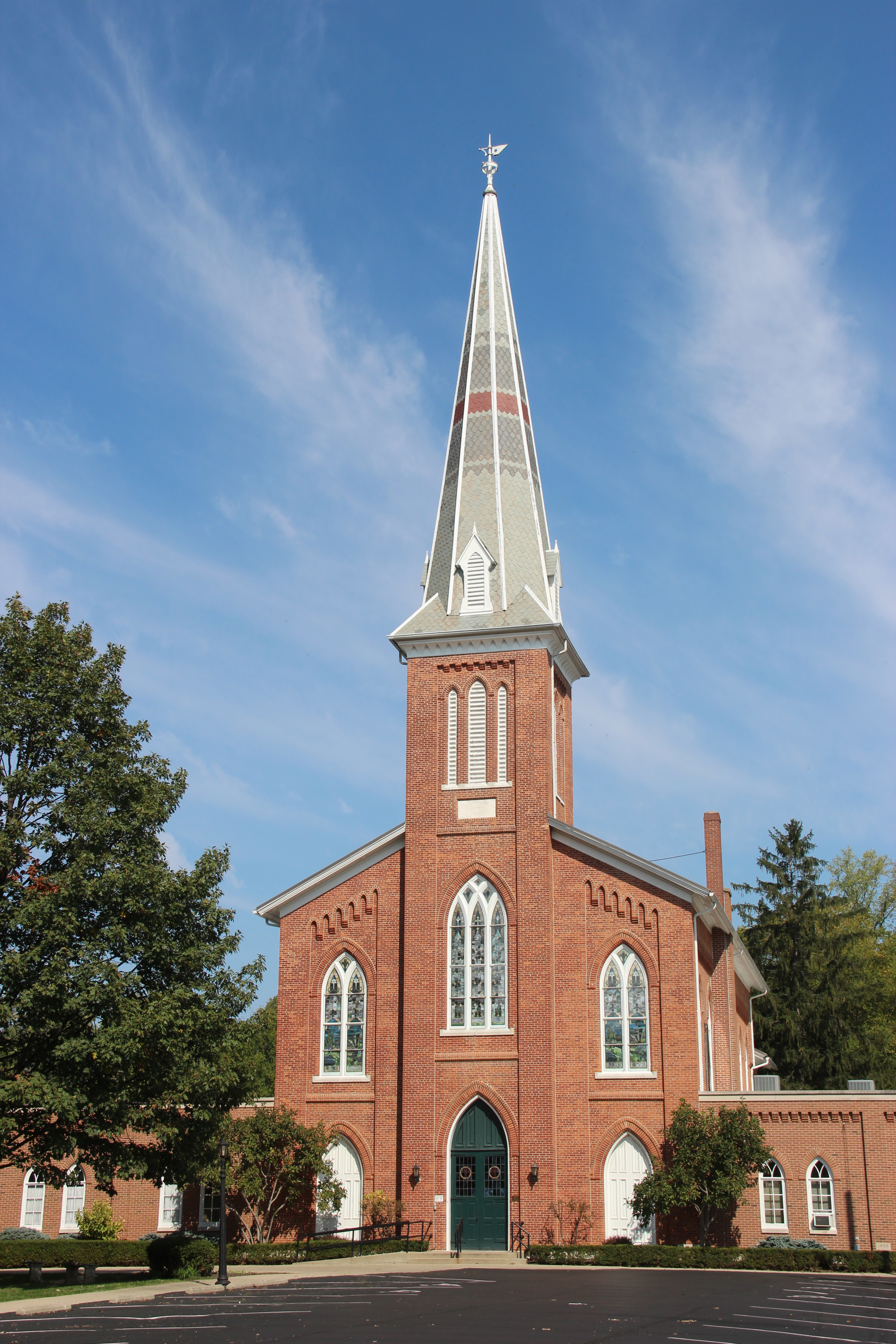

- Location within Ohio Location within the United States
- Location: 30 W. Warren St., Germantown, Ohio
- Coordinates: 39°37′40″N 84°22′18″W
- Area: less than one acre
- Built: 1867
- Architectural style: Gothic Revival
- MPS: Pennsylvania German Churches of Ohio MPS
- NRHP reference No.: 90001292
- Added to NRHP: September 6, 1990

Emmanuel's Evangelical Lutheran Church is a historic Lutheran church at 30 W. Warren Street in Germantown, Ohio. The Gothic Revival church building was constructed in 1867 for a congregation that formed in 1809. The congregation had originally shared a building with the local German Reformed congregation; when this arrangement proved inadequate in the 1830s, it built its own brick building, which was reconstructed into the 1867 building. It is one of four extant churches in the area built by Pennsylvania German settlers in the nineteenth century. The church's design features a gable front entrance split into three sections, each with an arched doorway and large arched stained glass window; the central section is topped by a tall multi-faced steeple.

The church was added to the National Register of Historic Places on September 6, 1990.
