= Carlisle Fort (Ohio) =

Archaeological site in southwestern Ohio

- Germantown Fort, Big Twin Works

- Approximate location within Ohio today
- 39°35′26.0″N 84°21′15.0″W
- Periods: Middle Woodland period, prehistoric
- Cultures: Hopewell tradition
- Location: Carlisle, Ohio, Montgomery County, Ohio, Warren County, Ohio,USA

History
- Built: Ca. 1-300 CE
- Carlisle Fort
- U.S. National Register of Historic Places
- NRHP reference No.: 74001584
- Added to NRHP: February 15, 1974

For other uses, see Carlisle Fort (disambiguation) Carlisle Fort, also known as Germantown Fort, or Big Twin Works, is a prehistoric hilltop earthwork located in Warren and Montgomery Counties in southwestern Ohio. It was initially thought to be a defensive structure, and so was referred to as a "fort," but modern archaeologists think it may have served a ceremonial purpose. It was first investigated in 1835, and is most likely of Hopewell origin. Because it is located near Carlisle, Ohio, it acquired the name "Carlisle Fort".

== Description ==
The site is believed to have been built between 1 and 300 CE by the Hopewell Culture. It is located on the flat summit of a hill and is divided into two sections, eastern (about 9 acres) and western (about 6 acres). The remains of a low wall, composed chiefly of surface stones and some limestone, enclose each section. The walls are 3,676 feet in length, enclosing a total area of about fifteen acres. In the center of the enclosed area, two stone mounds and one stone circle once existed, but local residents removed the stones for use in construction. Depressions in the earth are still visible where the stones were originally placed. The hilltop is bordered on the east and west by bluffs about 200 feet high. The Big Twin passes to the east, and other tributaries of the Great Miami River pass close to the site on the north and the west. Some local residents refer to the site as the Big Twin Works.

The eastern and western sections are separated by three stone walls, about 450 feet long, forming parallel crescents. A "gateway" to the site features a stone horseshoe-shaped semi-circle (removed in the 19th century), 78 feet by 45 feet and open to the east, which archaeologists think may have been the foundations of a building. A few remaining post-holes indicate that the stone walls were supported by wooden posts, or possibly a stockade, and may have been up to 15 feet high. This construction pattern is seen in other Native American sites, and in other parts of the world. Nearby is a stone circle 25 feet in diameter, with narrow pathways on either side. Four smaller stone circles are found inside the main walls, but their function is unknown.

Near the gateway, a fire bed was found on the cliff edge, suggesting that it may have been a signal fire, as it would have been visible for some distance. Such fire-pits have been found at other Hopewell sites. Ashes from the fire were thrown over the cliff at a specific spot, forming a pile about 10 feet deep.

Many of the stones were removed by local residents in the late 19th century and early 20th century, and an orchard planted on land immediately to the west (by Samuel Binkley's brother) may have disturbed associated structures. There are signs that natural erosion has deepened the ravines on either side of the site, possibly destroying other features. The site is now part of the Twin Rivers Metro Park.

== Archaeological investigations ==
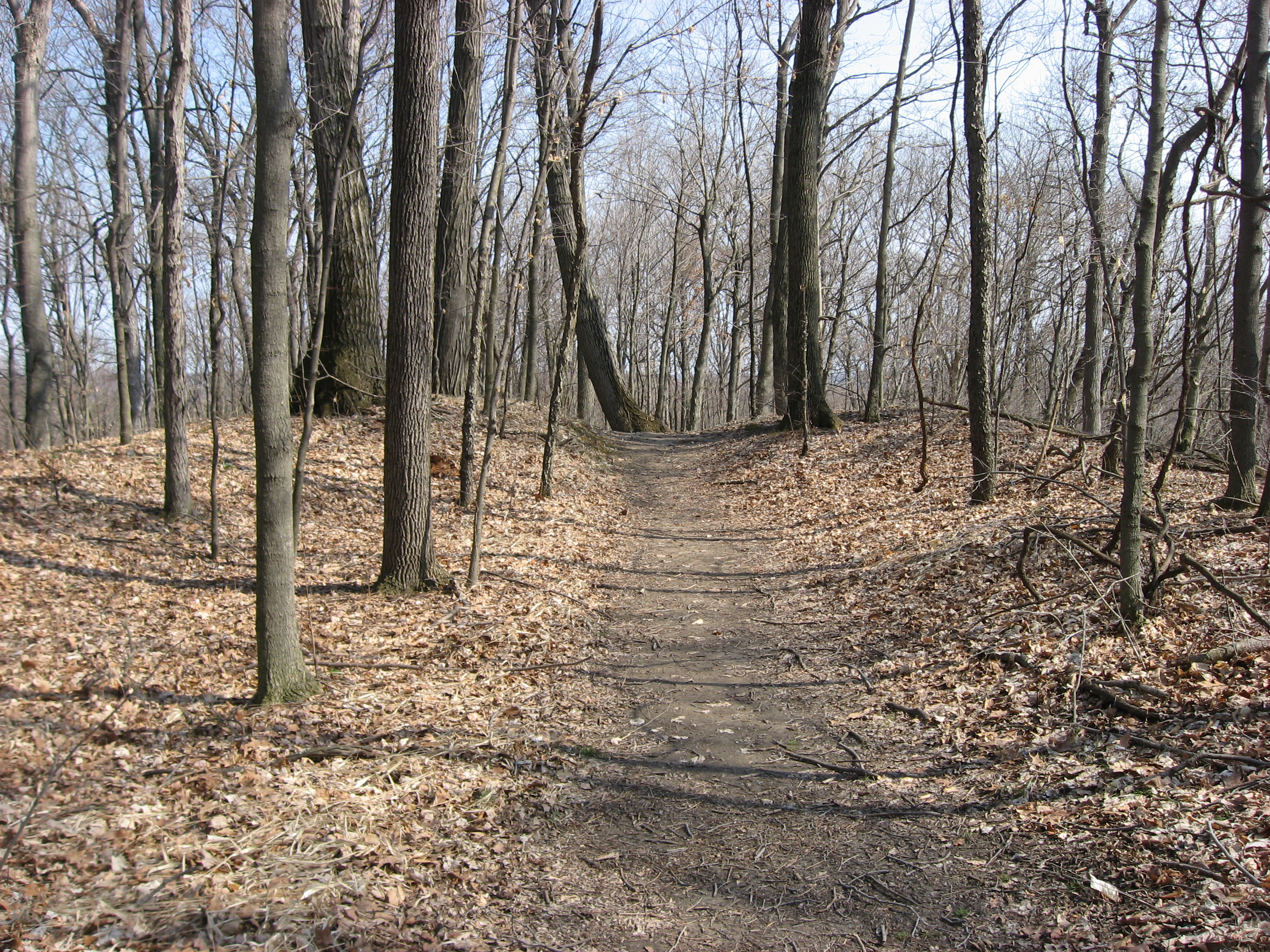
Trail leading to the gateway of Carlisle Fort.

The site was not included in Squier and Davis's 1848 survey of Ancient Monuments of the Mississippi Valley, even though it was mapped in 1835 by a physician named Samuel H. Binkley. Binkley and C. E. Blossom of the Miamisburg Bulletin surveyed the site again in 1875. The site was also surveyed in 1885 by J. P. MacLean, and in 1994 by Robert Connolly.

=== Observations by Samuel Binkley ===
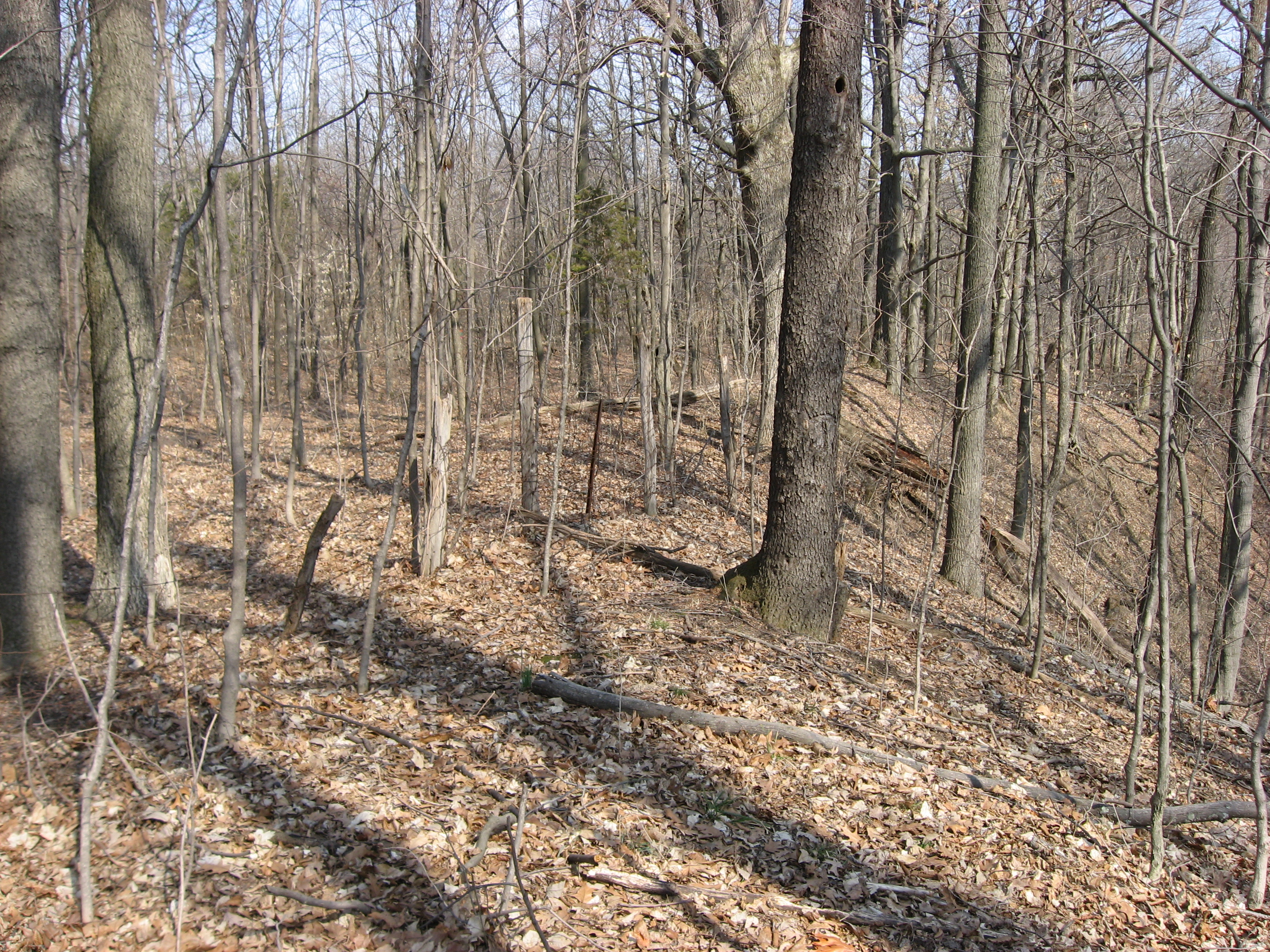
Section of the southern wall, buried under autumn leaves, at Carlisle Fort.

Binkley first visited the site in 1835, because his brother owned land nearby and had noticed the remains of stone walls. Binkley proposed that the summit of the hill had been made level when Carlisle Fort was built, and that a portion of the enclosed area contained a garden. He noted a number of large stones at the bottom of the ravines on both sides, suggesting that the hilltop was cleared and these stones were pushed over the edge. He concluded that the builders would have cleared the forest also, so that a signal fire would have been easily seen. Binkley observed the stone foundations of the horseshoe-shaped structure (which were later removed), and speculated that they were the foundations of a building. He noted faint depressions that may have been post-holes, and thought that the other five circles at the site were probably also buildings, although their purpose remained unclear. Binkley also found an area about ten feet square, paved with flat limestone rocks, on which ashes and bits of charcoal were seen, suggesting that this was a hearth. Binkley notes that, in Hopewell burial mounds, human remains are often found interred with wood-ash, and he considered the possibility that the site served a ceremonial purpose, although he noted that it would have been defensible. The walls appeared too low to provide any protection, and Binkley speculated that the stones merely buttressed a wooden palisade.

When Binkley returned in 1875, he found that streams had widened the ravines on both sides of the site. As a result, some of the stone walls on the eastern section had vanished into the ravines. Several of the other structures had been disturbed by erosion, although this was evidently before local residents had started removing stones from the site.

=== Observations by J. P. MacLean ===
J. P. MacLean visited the site in 1885 and published two articles on his findings in American Antiquarian in 1885: "Interesting Story of a Lost Race," and "The Mound Builders." MacLean believed that the Hopewell earthworks were used for communication in times of war, and that signal fires on the mounds could warn communities that an enemy was approaching: "...on through the whole Miami Valley the Warning by fire would pass till it reached Fort Ancient. What a grand and picturesque scene it must have been to see the great Miami Valley ablaze, and how disheartened the enemy must have been as they realized that they were discovered."

=== Observations by Robert Connolly ===
The site was investigated in 1994 by Ph.D. student Robert Connolly. He examined topographical maps of the area and concluded that the site may in fact be two conjoined enclosures, comparable to those at Fort Ancient and Old Stone Fort. He notes that many if not all hilltop enclosures from this period had "fired surfaces" such as the paved area Binkley observed at Carlisle Fort, although Connolly thinks that the use of limestone flagstones is unusual. He noted that Carlisle Fort is not associated with any burial mounds, unlike most other hilltop enclosures from this period. Connolly's dissertation focuses on the spiritual significance of primary and secondary gateways at Middle Woodland earthworks, and their association with "fired features" such as hearths.

Connolly feels that Middle Woodland earthworks served multiple functions, including communication by signal fires, defensive positions during war, and as a gathering-place for funerals and other ceremonies. They were probably also used for communal feasts, to mark celestial cycles, and to redistribute and process exotic raw materials. In spite of their significance in ceremonial activities, Connolly feels that it was likely that people lived in these hilltop enclosures in order to maintain them.

== Protection ==
On February 26, 1974, the National Park Service listed the Carlisle Fort site in the National Register of Historic Places.

In April 1990, the American Natural Resources Pipeline Company planned to build a 36-inch natural gas pipeline from Indiana to Lebanon, Ohio, which would have damaged the Carlisle Fort site. The Miami Valley Council of Native Americans filed suit to oppose the pipeline, arguing that it should be rerouted around Carlisle Fort, due to its archaeological importance, and the company agreed to build it at least 600 feet from the site.
