= Arnold Homestead =

- U.S. National Register of Historic Places
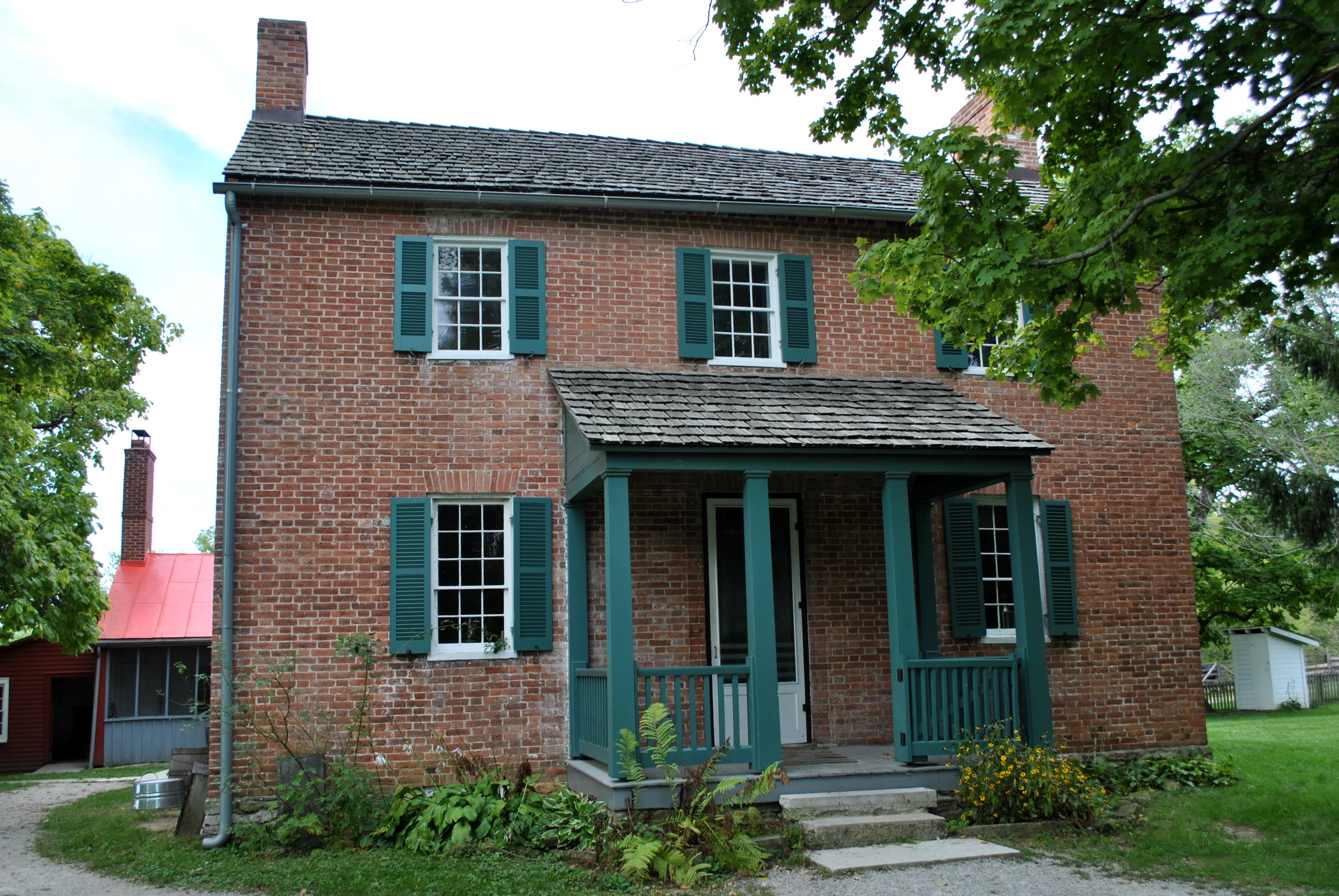
- Front of the farmhouse

- Location within Ohio Location within the United States
- Location: State Route 201 in Huber Heights, Ohio
- Coordinates: 39°52′25″N 84°5′30.5″W
- Area: 125 acres (51 ha)
- Built: 1800
- Architect: Daniel and Joseph Arnold
- Architectural style: Vernacular form of Federal
- NRHP reference No.: 77001077
- Added to NRHP: November 7, 1977

The Arnold Homestead is a historic homestead in the city of Huber Heights, a suburb of Dayton, Ohio, United States. Formed at the turn of the nineteenth century, it centers on an 1830s farmhouse that was built for an immigrant family from Virginia.

A native of present-day West Virginia, Daniel Arnold sold his farm and brought his wife Catherine and five children to settle in present-day Huber Heights in the early nineteenth century. Members of the Dunkard Brethren Church, they typified the German immigrant church's gradual movement westward as it gradually integrated with American society. After renting land over their first winter, Arnold bought the present farmstead from Henry Harshberger and occupied it for the remnant of his life. The family used a log cabin during their first years at the site before significantly improving their lives by constructing the present house in 1835.

Built of brick, the farmhouse rests on a stone foundation, is topped by an asphalt roof, and features additional elements of wood and asphalt. The basic plan is a simple two-story rectangle, wider than its length, with windowless ends that rise to chimney-topped gables. An extension, most of the width of the house, is attached to the rear, while a porch occupies the ell. Three windows pierce the second story on the facade, while the main entrance sits at the center of the first story between one window on either side. A small porch with a shed roof shelters the entrance. Besides the farmhouse, the complex includes a cemetery and six outbuildings, including the original log cabin and a bank barn.

Today, the Arnold farmstead is the core of Carriage Hill MetroPark. The farmhouse is operated as a historic house museum, staffed by individuals costumed as nineteenth-century farmers, while other parts of the farmstead are operated for ancillary purposes. The complex was listed on the National Register of Historic Places in 1977, qualifying both because of its place in local history and because of Daniel Arnold's significance in the area's settlement. It is one of four Huber Heights locations on the Register, along with the Ausenbaugh-McElhenny House, the Taylorsville Canal Inn (demolished), and Lock Seventy on the Miami and Erie Canal.
