= Brookville High School (Ohio) =

Coordinates: 39°49′41″N 84°25′13″W

Location
- 1 Blue Pride Drive; Brookville, Ohio 45309; United States

Information
- Type: Public secondary
- Superintendent: Jason Wood
- Principal: Jason Stephan
- Teaching staff: 24.90 (FTE)
- Grades: 9–12
- Enrollment: 416 (2023-2024)
- Student to teacher ratio: 16.71
- Colors: Royal Blue & White
- Mascot: Blue Devils
- Conference: Southwestern Buckeye League
- Website: Brookville High School

Brookville High School is part of Brookville Local Schools, Brookville, Ohio, United States. The school's nickname is the Blue Devils.

Brookville High School has been rated "Excellent" since 2002 by the Ohio Department of Education. The school met all 12 of the state indicators for the 2005–2006 school year. For the 2007–2008 and –2011-2012 school years, the school was rated "Excellent with Distinction", meeting 29 of the 30 state indicators. The only indicator that was not passed was 8th grade social studies, missing it by 13.3%.

On Memorial Day, 2019, Brookville High School was struck by an EF-4 tornado. There were no injuries at the school. The school's roof was torn off, but was deemed salvageable and was repaired.

== Ohio High School Athletic Association State Championships ==
- Boys Baseball – 1935
- Boys Track and Field – 1973, 2025
