= Carlisle, Ohio =

- City
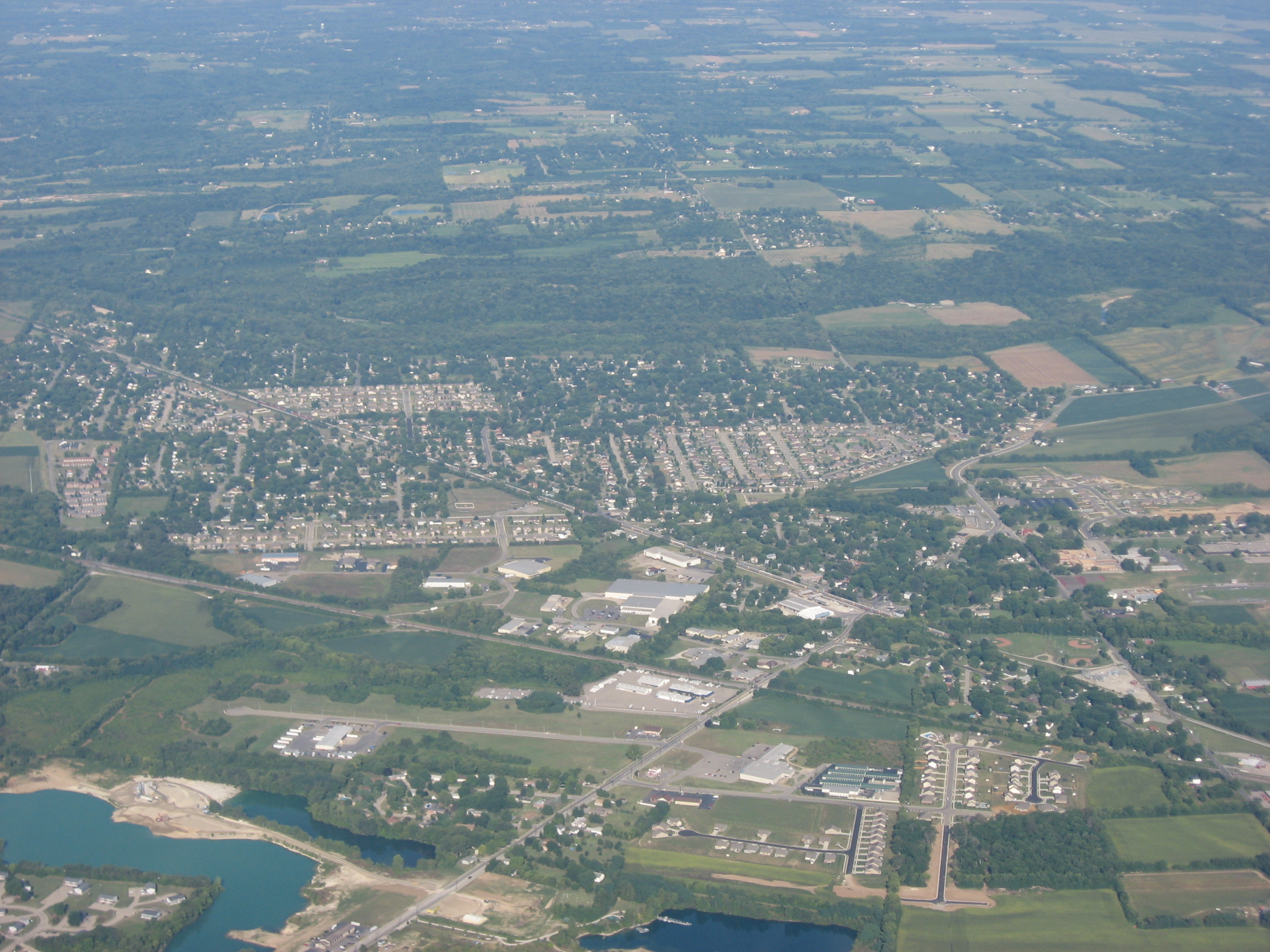
- Aerial view of Carlisle

- Seal
- Interactive map of Carlisle, Ohio
- Location within Ohio Location within the United States
- Coordinates: 39°34′51″N 84°19′12″W
- Country: United States
- State: Ohio
- Counties: Warren, Montgomery
- Township: Franklin, Miami

Government
  - Mayor: Randy Winkler

Area
  - Total: 3.71 sq mi (9.62 km^{2})
  - Land: 3.56 sq mi (9.22 km^{2})
  - Water: 0.15 sq mi (0.40 km^{2})
- Elevation: 689 ft (210 m)

Population (2020)
  - Total: 5,501
  - Estimate (2023): 5,740
  - Density: 1,546/sq mi (596.8/km^{2})
- Time zone: UTC-5 (Eastern (EST))
  - Summer (DST): UTC-4 (EDT)
- ZIP Code: 45005
- Area code: Area code 937
- FIPS code: 39-12168
- GNIS feature ID: 2393744
- Website: www.carlisleoh.org

Carlisle (/ˈkɑːrlaɪl/ KAR-lyle) is a city in Warren and Montgomery counties in the southwestern part of Ohio, United States. The population was 5,501 the 2020 census. The Warren County portion of Carlisle is part of the Cincinnati metropolitan area, while the Montgomery County portion is part of the Dayton metropolitan area.

== History ==
Carlisle had its start in 1850 when the railroad was extended to that point and a train station was built. The village was named for "railroad man" George B. Carlisle, who in the mid-19th century "bought and platted a large section of the community." A post office was established at Carlisle in 1852 and remained in operation until 1961.

Carlisle's population increased from 4,872 in the 1990 census to 5,121 in the 2000 census; passing the threshold of 5,000, its designation was changed from village to city. As of the 2010 census, the population was 4,915; this population loss caused Carlisle to once again become a village. In the 2020 census, the population was 5,501; on October 20, 2021, Carlisle regained city status.

== Geography ==
Carlisle is in northwestern Warren County, in the northern part of Franklin Township. A smaller portion of the city is in southern Montgomery County, in the southwestern part of Miami Township. It is bordered to the south by the city of Franklin.

Ohio State Route 123 passes through Carlisle as Central Avenue, leading south 2 miles (3 km) to the center of Franklin and northwest 4 miles (6 km) to Germantown. Dayton is 17 miles (27 km) to the northeast, and downtown Cincinnati is 42 miles (68 km) to the south.

According to the U.S. Census Bureau, the city of Carlisle has a total area of 3.71 square miles (9.61 km^{2}), of which 3.56 square miles (9.22 km^{2}) are land and 0.16 square miles (0.41 km^{2}), or 4.17%, are water. The Great Miami River, a tributary of the Ohio River, flows southward just east of the city limits.

== Sites of interest ==
Carlisle is known for an area landmark: a "double UFO" house off Chamberlain Road, which resembles two silver-colored flying saucers connected by a metal duct. This is actually two Futuro houses combined into one residence.

Just west of town, at the Twin Creek Metro Park, is a protected archaeological site, the Carlisle Fort, a hilltop earthwork believed to have been built between 1,700 and 2,000 years ago, either as a fortress or as a Hopewell ceremonial site.

== Demographics ==
Historical population
Census	Pop.	Note	%±
1880	197		—
1960	671		—
1970	3,821		469.4%
1980	4,276		11.9%
1990	4,872		13.9%
2000	5,121		5.1%
2010	4,915		−4.0%
2020	5,501		11.9%
2023 (est.)	5,740	▲	4.3%
U.S. Decennial Census

=== 2010 census ===
As of the census of 2010, there were 4,915 people, 1,866 households, and 1,430 families living in the city. The population density was 1,392.4 inhabitants per square mile (537.6/km^{2}). There were 2,066 housing units at an average density of 585.3 per square mile (226.0/km^{2}). The racial makeup of the city was 98.3% White, 0.4% African American, 0.1% Native American, 0.1% Asian, 0.2% from other races, and 0.8% from two or more races. Hispanic or Latino of any race were 1.0% of the population.

There were 1,866 households, of which 33.9% had children under the age of 18 living with them, 62.8% were married couples living together, 9.3% had a female householder with no husband present, 4.5% had a male householder with no wife present, and 23.4% were non-families. 20.6% of all households were made up of individuals, and 10.1% had someone living alone who was 65 years of age or older. The average household size was 2.60 and the average family size was 2.99.

The median age in the city was 40.5 years. 24.3% of residents were under the age of 18; 7.2% were between the ages of 18 and 24; 25% were from 25 to 44; 28.3% were from 45 to 64; and 15.1% were 65 years of age or older. The gender makeup of the city was 48.5% male and 51.5% female.

=== 2000 census ===
As of the census of 2000, there were 5,121 people, 1,849 households, and 1,475 families living in the city. The population density was 1,504.7 inhabitants per square mile (581.0/km^{2}). There were 1,937 housing units at an average density of 569.2 per square mile (219.8/km^{2}). The racial makeup of the city was 98.38% White, 0.23% African American, 0.18% Native American, 0.29% Asian, 0.06% Pacific Islander, 0.14% from other races, and 0.72% from two or more races. Hispanic or Latino of any race were 0.58% of the population.

There were 1,849 households, out of which 36.9% had children under the age of 18 living with them, 66.9% were married couples living together, 8.9% had a female householder with no husband present, and 20.2% were non-families. 16.4% of all households were made up of individuals, and 5.3% had someone living alone who was 65 years of age or older. The average household size was 2.74 and the average family size was 3.08.

In the city the population was spread out, with 26.5% under the age of 18, 8.2% from 18 to 24, 31.1% from 25 to 44, 24.9% from 45 to 64, and 9.3% who were 65 years of age or older. The median age was 36 years. For every 100 females there were 102.2 males. For every 100 females age 18 and over, there were 100.5 males.

The median income for a household in the city was $45,446, and the median income for a family was $50,599. Males had a median income of $36,544 versus $26,300 for females. The per capita income for the city was $19,358. About 6.4% of families and 8.4% of the population were below the poverty line, including 10.4% of those under age 18 and 8.4% of those age 65 or over.
