= Brookville, Ohio =

- City
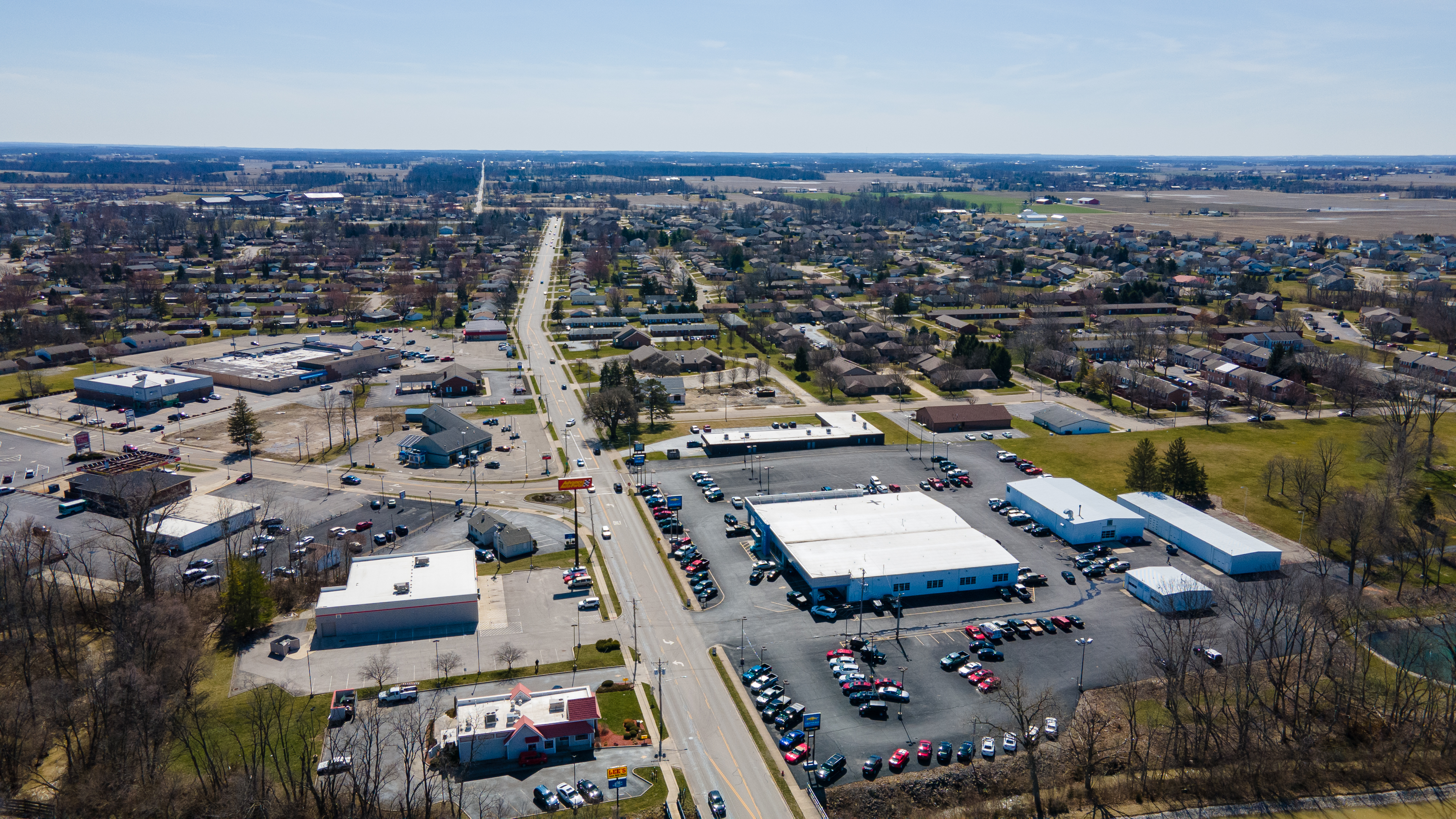
- Brookville in 2021

- Flag Seal
- Motto: " A Proud And Progressive Community "
- Interactive map of Brookville, Ohio
- Location within Ohio Location within the United States
- Coordinates: 39°50′21″N 84°25′03″W
- Country: United States
- State: Ohio
- County: Montgomery

Government
  - Mayor: Chuck Letner

Area
  - Total: 3.83 sq mi (9.92 km^{2})
  - Land: 3.83 sq mi (9.92 km^{2})
  - Water: 0 sq mi (0.00 km^{2})
- Elevation: 1,004 ft (306 m)

Population (2020)
  - Total: 5,989
  - Estimate (2023): 5,918
  - Density: 1,563.7/sq mi (603.74/km^{2})
- Time zone: UTC-5 (Eastern (EST))
  - Summer (DST): UTC-4 (EDT)
- ZIP code: 45309
- Area codes: 937, 326
- FIPS code: 39-09358
- GNIS feature ID: 2393433
- Website: https://www.brookvilleohio.com/

Brookville is a small city in northwestern Montgomery County, Ohio, United States. It is a suburb of Dayton. The population was 5,989 at the 2020 census.

== History ==
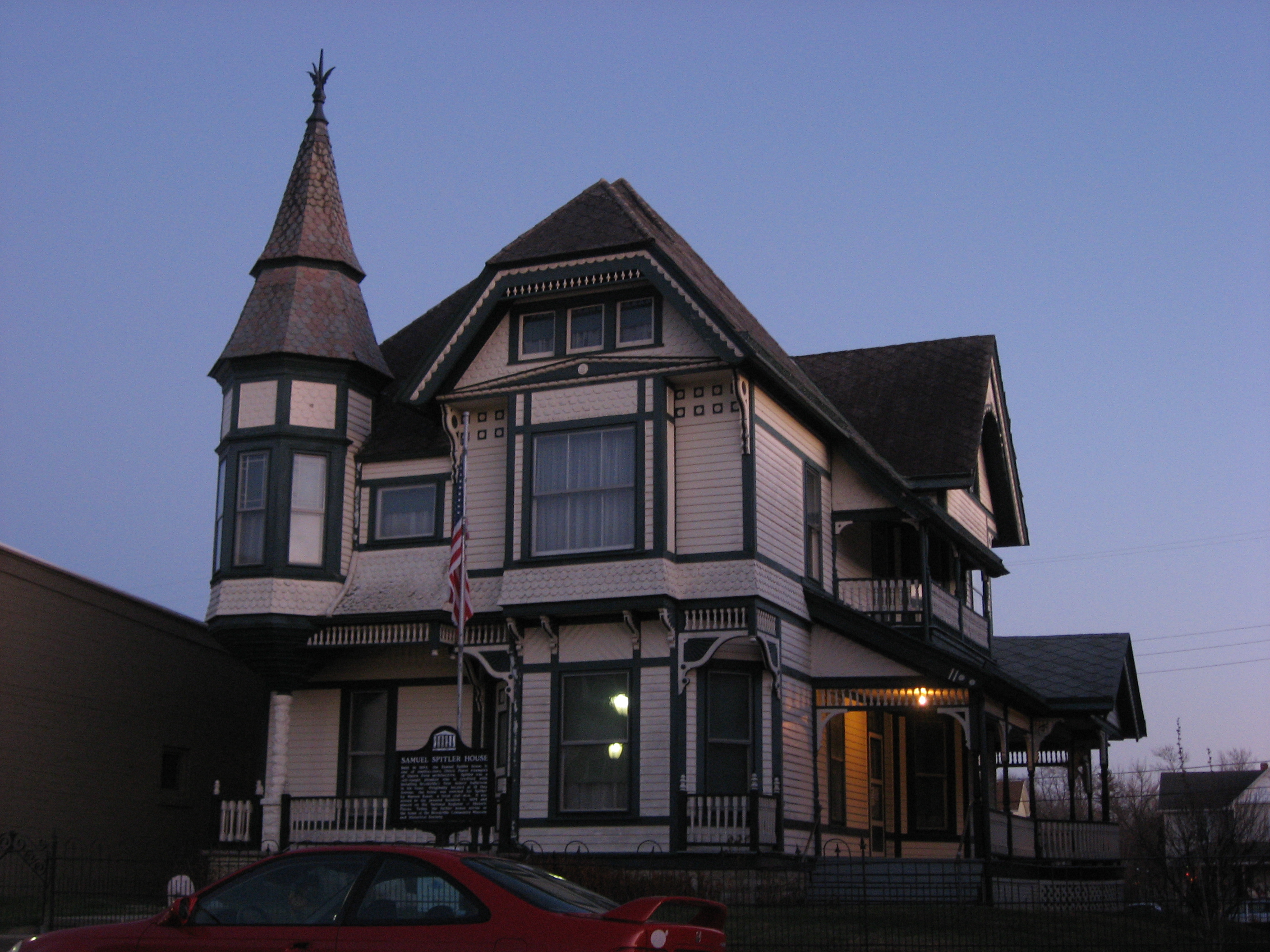
The Samuel Spitler House, a historic landmark in the city

Brookville had its first pioneers around 1814. Brookville was platted in 1850, and named for a small brook near the town site.

== Geography ==
According to the United States Census Bureau, the city has a total area of 3.82 square miles (9.89 km^{2}), all land.

== Demographics ==
Historical population
Census	Pop.	Note	%±
1880	574		—
1890	618		7.7%
1900	869		40.6%
1910	1,187		36.6%
1920	1,336		12.6%
1930	1,403		5.0%
1940	1,653		17.8%
1950	1,908		15.4%
1960	3,184		66.9%
1970	4,403		38.3%
1980	4,322		−1.8%
1990	4,621		6.9%
2000	5,289		14.5%
2010	5,884		11.2%
2020	5,989		1.8%
2023 (est.)	5,918		−1.2%

=== 2020 census ===
As of the 2020 census, Brookville had a population of 5,989. The median age was 44.4 years. 21.3% of residents were under the age of 18 and 26.0% of residents were 65 years of age or older. For every 100 females there were 85.7 males, and for every 100 females age 18 and over there were 81.7 males age 18 and over.

99.3% of residents lived in urban areas, while 0.7% lived in rural areas.

There were 2,605 households in Brookville, of which 27.7% had children under the age of 18 living in them. Of all households, 44.8% were married-couple households, 17.4% were households with a male householder and no spouse or partner present, and 31.7% were households with a female householder and no spouse or partner present. About 35.1% of all households were made up of individuals and 20.4% had someone living alone who was 65 years of age or older.

There were 2,766 housing units, of which 5.8% were vacant. The homeowner vacancy rate was 2.1% and the rental vacancy rate was 4.0%.

Racial composition as of the 2020 census
Race	Number	Percent
White	5,602	93.5%
Black or African American	50	0.8%
American Indian and Alaska Native	7	0.1%
Asian	75	1.3%
Native Hawaiian and Other Pacific Islander	2	0.0%
Some other race	31	0.5%
Two or more races	222	3.7%
Hispanic or Latino (of any race)	71	1.2%

=== 2010 census ===
As of the census of 2010, there were 5,884 people, 2,508 households, and 1,626 families living in the city. The population density was 1,540.3 inhabitants per square mile (594.7/km^{2}). There were 2,684 housing units at an average density of 702.6 per square mile (271.3/km^{2}). The racial makeup of the city was 97.6% White, 0.4% African American, 0.1% Native American, 0.9% Asian, 0.3% from other races, and 0.7% from two or more races. Hispanic or Latino of any race were 0.7% of the population.

There were 2,508 households, of which 30.5% had children under the age of 18 living with them, 48.0% were married couples living together, 12.5% had a female householder with no husband present, 4.4% had a male householder with no wife present, and 35.2% were non-families. 31.3% of all households were made up of individuals, and 17% had someone living alone who was 65 years of age or older. The average household size was 2.29 and the average family size was 2.85.

The median age in the city was 42.3 years. 23.3% of residents were under the age of 18; 7.7% were between the ages of 18 and 24; 22.3% were from 25 to 44; 24.7% were from 45 to 64; and 22.2% were 65 years of age or older. The gender makeup of the city was 46.2% male and 53.8% female. The median household income for a family is $60,988.

=== 2000 census ===
As of the census of 2000, there were 5,289 people, 2,204 households, and 1,463 families living in the city. The population density was 1,570.6 inhabitants per square mile (606.4/km^{2}). There were 2,326 housing units at an average density of 690.7 per square mile (266.7/km^{2}). The racial makeup of the city was 98.71% White, 0.08% African American, 0.13% Native American, 0.64% Asian, 0.21% from other races, and 0.23% from two or more races. Hispanic or Latino of any race were 0.43% of the population.

There were 2,204 households, out of which 29.4% had children under the age of 18 living with them, 52.9% were married couples living together, 10.1% had a female householder with no husband present, and 33.6% were non-families. 30.4% of all households were made up of individuals, and 15.6% had someone living alone who was 65 years of age or older. The average household size was 2.32 and the average family size was 2.87.

In the city the population was spread out, with 23.3% under the age of 18, 7.1% from 18 to 24, 27.1% from 25 to 44, 21.9% from 45 to 64, and 20.5% who were 65 years of age or older. The median age was 40 years. For every 100 females, there were 87.4 males. For every 100 females age 18 and over, there were 80.6 males.

The median income for a household in the city was $39,583, and the median income for a family was $48,068. Males had a median income of $35,938 versus $24,688 for females. The per capita income for the city was $20,124. About 3.3% of families and 5.3% of the population were below the poverty line, including 7.6% of those under age 18 and 6.6% of those age 65 or over.

== Education ==
Brookville is served by the public schooling district named Brookville Local School District. The schools consist of Brookville Elementary School, Brookville Intermediate School, and Brookville High School.

Brookville has a public library, a branch of the Dayton Metro Library.
