= Farmersville, Ohio =

- Village
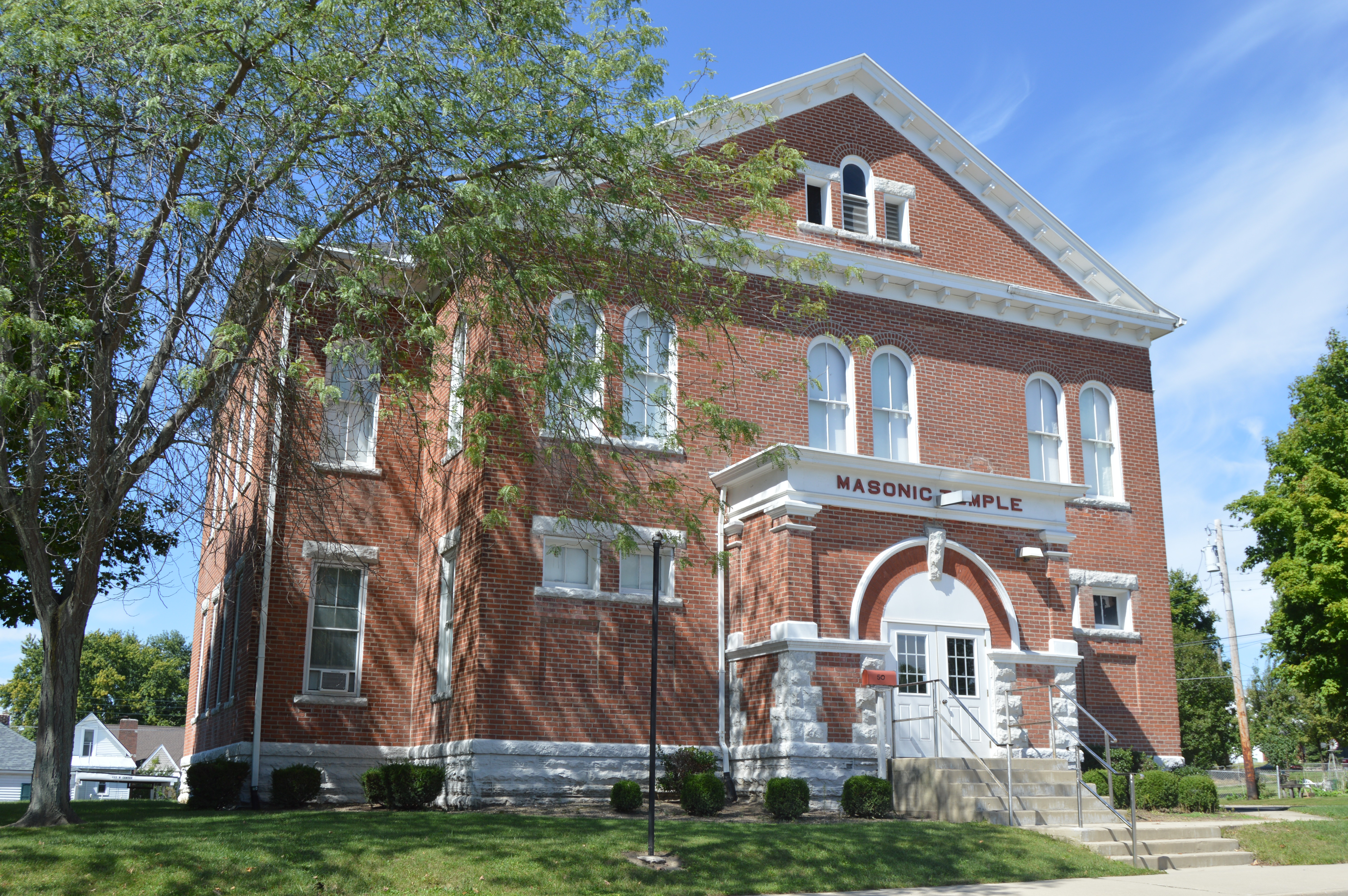
- Masonic temple

- Location in Montgomery County and the state of Ohio.
- Coordinates: 39°40′43″N 84°25′39″W
- Country: United States
- State: Ohio
- County: Montgomery

Area
  - Total: 0.71 sq mi (1.85 km^{2})
  - Land: 0.71 sq mi (1.85 km^{2})
  - Water: 0 sq mi (0.00 km^{2})
- Elevation: 869 ft (265 m)

Population (2020)
  - Total: 975
  - Estimate (2023): 973
  - Density: 1,364/sq mi (526.7/km^{2})
- Time zone: UTC-5 (Eastern (EST))
  - Summer (DST): UTC-4 (EDT)
- ZIP code: 45325
- Area codes: 937, 326
- FIPS code: 39-26656
- GNIS feature ID: 2398862
- Website: www.farmersville.us

Farmersville is a village in Jackson Township, Montgomery County, Ohio, United States. The population was 975 at the 2020 census. It is part of the Dayton Metropolitan Statistical Area.

== History ==
Farmersville was platted in 1832, and named from its location in a farming district. The village was incorporated in 1849. A post office was established at Farmersville in 1833, and remained in operation until after 2000.

== Geography ==
According to the United States Census Bureau, the village has a total area of 0.72 square miles (1.86 km^{2}), all land.

== Demographics ==
Historical population
Census	Pop.	Note	%±
1870	312		—
1880	794		154.5%
1890	472		−40.6%
1900	440		−6.8%
1910	437		−0.7%
1920	479		9.6%
1930	446		−6.9%
1940	464		4.0%
1950	587		26.5%
1960	797		35.8%
1970	865		8.5%
1980	950		9.8%
1990	932		−1.9%
2000	980		5.2%
2010	1,009		3.0%
2020	975		−3.4%
2023 (est.)	973	▼	−0.2%
U.S. Decennial Census

=== 2010 census ===
As of the census of 2010, there were 1,009 people, 371 households, and 288 families living in the village. The population density was 1,401.4 inhabitants per square mile (541.1/km^{2}). There were 402 housing units at an average density of 558.3 per square mile (215.6/km^{2}). The racial makeup of the village was 97.6% White, 0.2% Asian, 0.2% from other races, and 2.0% from two or more races. Hispanic or Latino of any race were 0.6% of the population.

There were 371 households, of which 42.3% had children under the age of 18 living with them, 64.4% were married couples living together, 9.7% had a female householder with no husband present, 3.5% had a male householder with no wife present, and 22.4% were non-families. 19.1% of all households were made up of individuals, and 7% had someone living alone who was 65 years of age or older. The average household size was 2.72 and the average family size was 3.08.

The median age in the village was 36.8 years. 28.5% of residents were under the age of 18; 4.9% were between the ages of 18 and 24; 30% were from 25 to 44; 25.2% were from 45 to 64; and 11.1% were 65 years of age or older. The gender makeup of the village was 47.0% male and 53.0% female.

=== 2000 census ===
As of the census of 2000, there were 980 people, 354 households, and 280 families living in the village. The population density was 1,389.7 inhabitants per square mile (536.6/km^{2}). There were 368 housing units at an average density of 521.8 per square mile (201.5/km^{2}). The racial makeup of the village was 99.18% White, 0.20% African American, 0.10% Asian, and 0.51% from two or more races. Hispanic or Latino of any race were 0.51% of the population.

There were 354 households, out of which 42.7% had children under the age of 18 living with them, 64.4% were married couples living together, 10.5% had a female householder with no husband present, and 20.9% were non-families. 16.9% of all households were made up of individuals, and 8.5% had someone living alone who was 65 years of age or older. The average household size was 2.77 and the average family size was 3.13.

In the village, the population was spread out, with 29.9% under the age of 18, 9.3% from 18 to 24, 33.3% from 25 to 44, 17.9% from 45 to 64, and 9.7% who were 65 years of age or older. The median age was 33 years. For every 100 females there were 96.0 males. For every 100 females age 18 and over, there were 90.8 males.

The median income for a household in the village was $43,125, and the median income for a family was $50,625. Males had a median income of $39,875 versus $23,672 for females. The per capita income for the village was $17,085. About 3.4% of families and 3.5% of the population were below the poverty line, including none of those under age 18 and 8.7% of those age 65 or over.
