= Germantown, Ohio =

- City
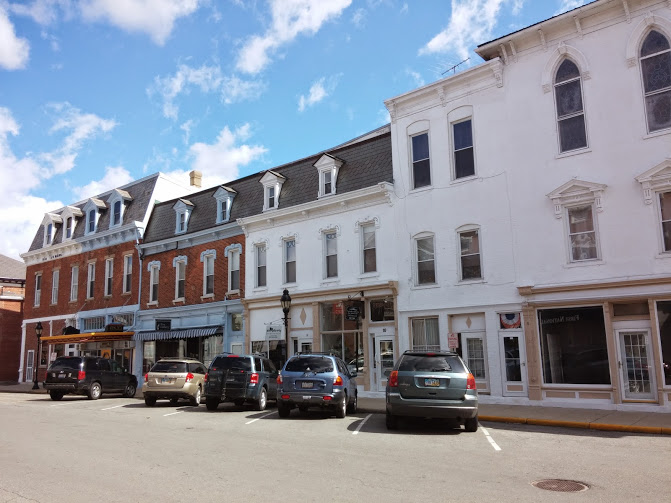
- Main Street in Germantown

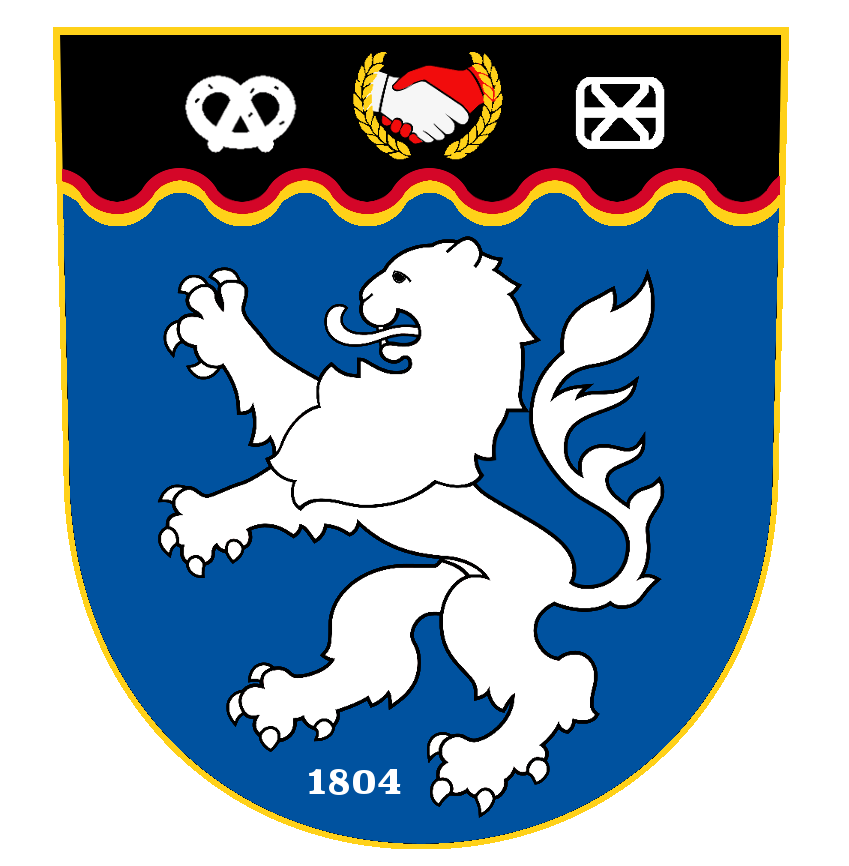
- Coat of arms
- Nicknames: Jewel of the Twin Valley; Spoke and Wheel City
- Interactive map of Germantown, Ohio
- Location within Ohio Location within the United States
- Coordinates: 39°37′38″N 84°22′27″W
- Country: United States
- State: Ohio
- County: Montgomery
- Established: 1804
- Founded: 1814
- Incorporated: 1833
- Founder: Philip Gunckel

Government
  - Mayor: Terry Johnson

Area
  - Total: 4.22 sq mi (10.93 km^{2})
  - Land: 4.22 sq mi (10.93 km^{2})
  - Water: 0 sq mi (0.00 km^{2})
- Elevation: 771 ft (235 m)

Population (2020)
  - Total: 5,796
  - Estimate (2023): 5,809
  - Density: 1,373/sq mi (530.1/km^{2})
- Time zone: UTC-5 (Eastern (EST))
  - Summer (DST): UTC-4 (EDT)
- ZIP codes: 45325, 45327
- Area codes: 937, 326
- FIPS code: 39-29932
- GNIS feature ID: 2398954
- Website: http://www.germantown.oh.us/

Germantown is a city in Montgomery County, Ohio, United States. The population was 5,796 at the 2020 census. A part of the Dayton metropolitan area, Germantown was founded by German Americans from Pennsylvania and was once home to a cigar industry.

== History ==
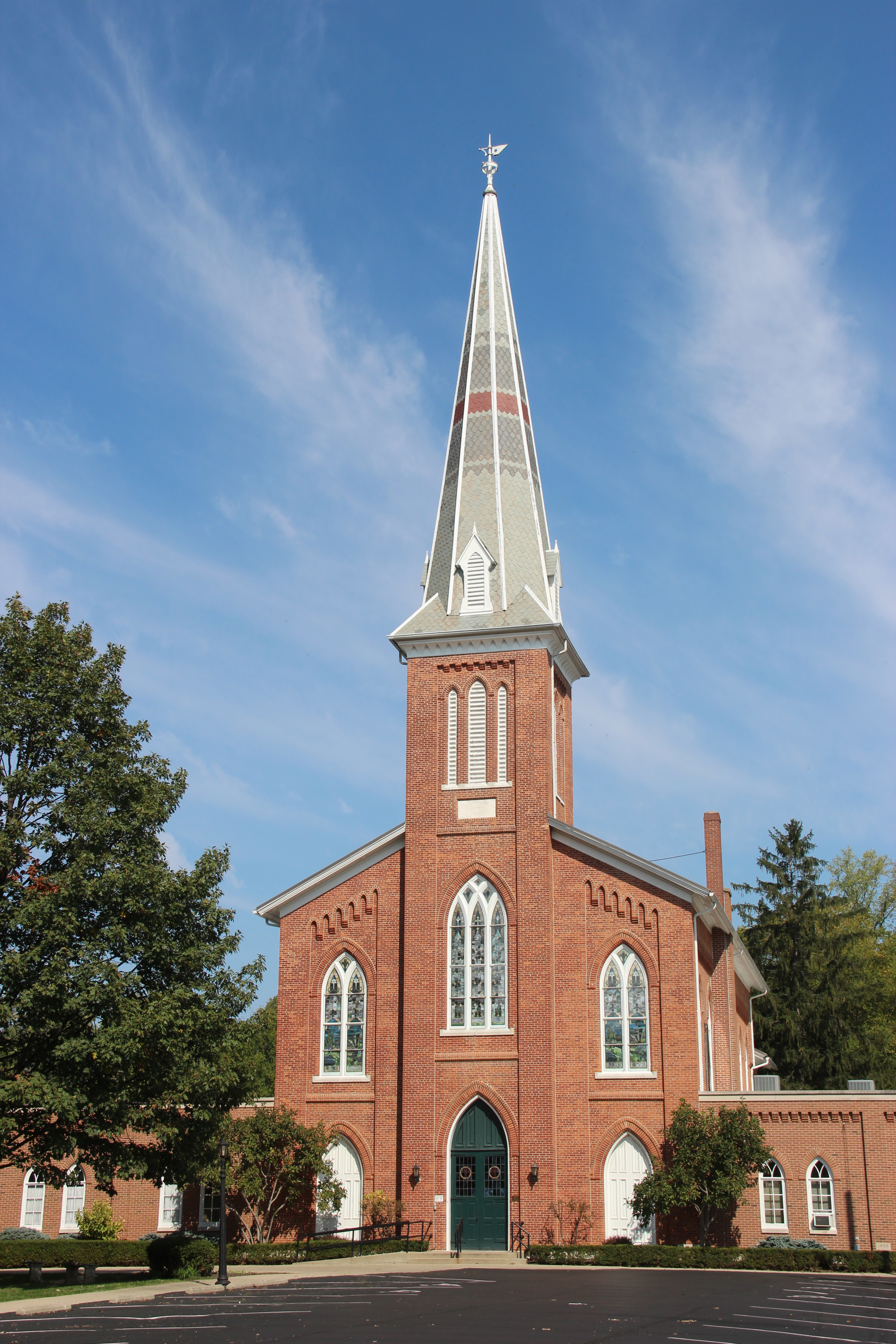
Emmanuel's Evangelical Lutheran Church was built in 1867 and is one of four extant churches in the area built by Pennsylvania German settlers in the 19th century.

Germantown was established in 1804 by German-speaking settlers from Berks County, Pennsylvania. Philip Gunckel, the only member of the group who spoke English, is recognized as Germantown's founder, who chose the site for a grist mill and laid out the original town plan in 1814. The Gunckel Town Plan, maintaining many of its original 19th and early 20th century buildings, has been recognized as a Historic District and has been placed on the National Register of Historic Places.

Germantown underwent many economic changes as distilleries and the cigar industry both came and went. In 1847, the Mudlick Distillery was established and, with an output of 30 barrels of whiskey a day, was considered the largest in the country for many years. At one time, the municipality housed up to 12 cigar warehouses and five factories, with the tobacco industry employing many residents up until the 1970s.

== Geography ==
Germantown is situated within German Township, in the south-western part of Montgomery County, Ohio. The town is in an area known as the Twin Valley, due to the Little Twin Creek on its east side, and Big Twin on its west and south sides, being in the forks of these streams.

According to the United States Census Bureau, the village has a total area of 4.26 square miles (11.03 km^{2}), all land.

== Demographics ==
Historical population
Census	Pop.	Note	%±
1830	501		—
1860	1,438		—
1870	1,440		0.1%
1880	1,618		12.4%
1890	1,437		−11.2%
1900	1,702		18.4%
1910	1,778		4.5%
1920	1,827		2.8%
1930	2,029		11.1%
1940	2,095		3.3%
1950	2,478		18.3%
1960	3,399		37.2%
1970	4,088		20.3%
1980	5,015		22.7%
1990	4,916		−2.0%
2000	4,884		−0.7%
2010	5,547		13.6%
2020	5,796		4.5%
2023 (est.)	5,809		0.2%

=== 2020 census ===
As of the 2020 census, Germantown had a population of 5,796. The median age was 38.3 years. 25.9% of residents were under the age of 18 and 17.5% of residents were 65 years of age or older. For every 100 females there were 95.0 males, and for every 100 females age 18 and over there were 88.4 males age 18 and over.

94.9% of residents lived in urban areas, while 5.1% lived in rural areas.

There were 2,265 households in Germantown, of which 35.7% had children under the age of 18 living in them. Of all households, 50.1% were married-couple households, 16.3% were households with a male householder and no spouse or partner present, and 25.6% were households with a female householder and no spouse or partner present. About 25.9% of all households were made up of individuals and 12.0% had someone living alone who was 65 years of age or older.

There were 2,380 housing units, of which 4.8% were vacant. The homeowner vacancy rate was 0.6% and the rental vacancy rate was 4.9%.

Racial composition as of the 2020 census
Race	Number	Percent
White	5,396	93.1%
Black or African American	109	1.9%
American Indian and Alaska Native	1	0.0%
Asian	28	0.5%
Native Hawaiian and Other Pacific Islander	1	0.0%
Some other race	23	0.4%
Two or more races	238	4.1%
Hispanic or Latino (of any race)	105	1.8%

=== 2010 census ===
As of the census of 2010, there were 5,547 people, 2,142 households, and 1,584 families residing in the village. The population density was 1,302.1 inhabitants per square mile (502.7/km^{2}). There were 2,328 housing units at an average density of 546.5 per square mile (211.0/km^{2}). The racial makeup of the village was 97.5% White, 0.8% African American, 0.2% Native American, 0.5% Asian, 0.1% from other races, and 0.8% from two or more races. Hispanic or Latino of any race were 1.2% of the population.

There were 2,142 households, of which 38.1% had children under the age of 18 living with them, 55.5% were married couples living together, 13.0% had a female householder with no husband present, 5.5% had a male householder with no wife present, and 26.1% were non-families. 22.6% of all households were made up of individuals, and 9.4% had someone living alone who was 65 years of age or older. The average household size was 2.57 and the average family size was 3.00.

The median age in the village was 37.5 years. 27.3% of residents were under the age of 18; 7% were between the ages of 18 and 24; 27% were from 25 to 44; 25.6% were from 45 to 64; and 13.1% were 65 years of age or older. The gender makeup of the village was 48.0% male and 52.0% female.

=== 2000 census ===
As of the census of 2000, Germantown was a village, and there were 4,884 people, 1,898 households, and 1,412 families residing there. The population density was 1,361.2 inhabitants per square mile (525.6/km^{2}). There were 1,994 housing units at an average density of 555.7 per square mile (214.6/km^{2}). The racial makeup of the village was 98.53% White, 0.37% African American, 0.10% Native American, 0.31% Asian, 0.08% from other races, and 0.61% from two or more races. Hispanic or Latino of any race were 0.78% of the population.

There were 1,898 households, out of which 36.2% had children under the age of 18 living with them, 59.8% were married couples living together, 10.5% had a female householder with no husband present, and 25.6% were non-families. 22.8% of all households were made up of individuals, and 9.3% had someone living alone who was 65 years of age or older. The average household size was 2.55 and the average family size was 3.00.

In the village the population was spread out, with 27.1% under the age of 18, 7.4% from 18 to 24, 29.6% from 25 to 44, 23.4% from 45 to 64, and 12.5% who were 65 years of age or older. The median age was 37 years. For every 100 females, there were 97.9 males. For every 100 females age 18 and over, there were 92.5 males.

The median income for a household in the village was $47,179, and the median income for a family was $54,617. Males had a median income of $40,156 versus $28,622 for females. The per capita income for the village was $23,287. About 4.0% of families and 5.8% of the population were below the poverty line, including 11.0% of those under age 18 and 1.3% of those age 65 or over.

== Government ==
Germantown adopted a council-manager form of government on June 8, 1976. The Municipality is governed by a mayor and six council members, all elected at large. The municipal manager supervises the daily operation of the government. Departments include the Street & Storm Sewer Department, Water & Sanitary Sewer Department, Planning & Zoning, Police, Fire, and Finance.

== Arts and culture ==
Germantown is known for its historic downtown area and the unique wagon-wheel design of its alley system, which was originally laid out by Philip Gunckel when he settled in Germantown. The system is roughly bounded by Mulberry and Walnut Streets, and Warren and Market Streets. The downtown area was added to the National Historic Register in 1976.

The By-Jo is an active historic theater in Germantown, opened in 1926.

== Education ==
Germantown Public Schools are part of the Valley View Local School District.

== Sister cities ==
- Marktheidenfeld, Bavaria, Germany, since 1980
- Farmersville, Ohio, United States
- Miamisburg, Ohio, United States
