= The M. K. Morse Company =

American industrial company

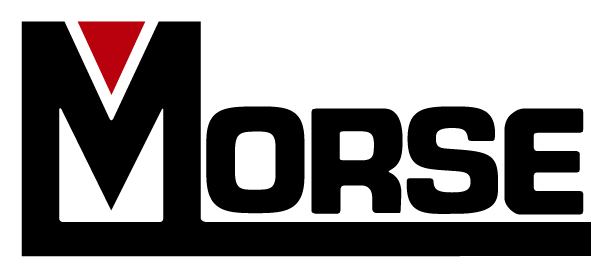
- Company type: Private
- Industry: Manufacturing
- Founded: 1962; 64 years ago Canton, Ohio U.S.
- Founder: M. Kenneth Morse
- Headquarters: Canton, Ohio, U.S.
- Area served: Worldwide
- Key people: Nancy Morse Sonner (Chairman/CEO-Owner); Sally Dale (Owner); Phil Carlin (COO); John Sweeney (President)
- Products: Saw Blades
- Number of employees: 510 (2021)
- Website: www.mkmorse.com

The M. K. Morse Company is a global manufacturer of saw blades and power tool accessories. M. K. Morse sells products in 70 countries.

== Company history ==
In 1960, after ten years of representing other producers of perishable hardware, M. K. "Ken" Morse became frustrated after losing some of the manufacturers that he was representing due to undependable suppliers. In order to ensure on-time delivery of products, Morse began selling hand hacksaw blades under the M. K. Morse label. Two years later, he began manufacturing his own.

In 1968, Morse expanded production to include bi-metal hole saws, and later in 1974, Morse began manufacturing hole saw arbors. In 1978, Morse patented the industry's first one-piece hole saw called "The Real McCoy".

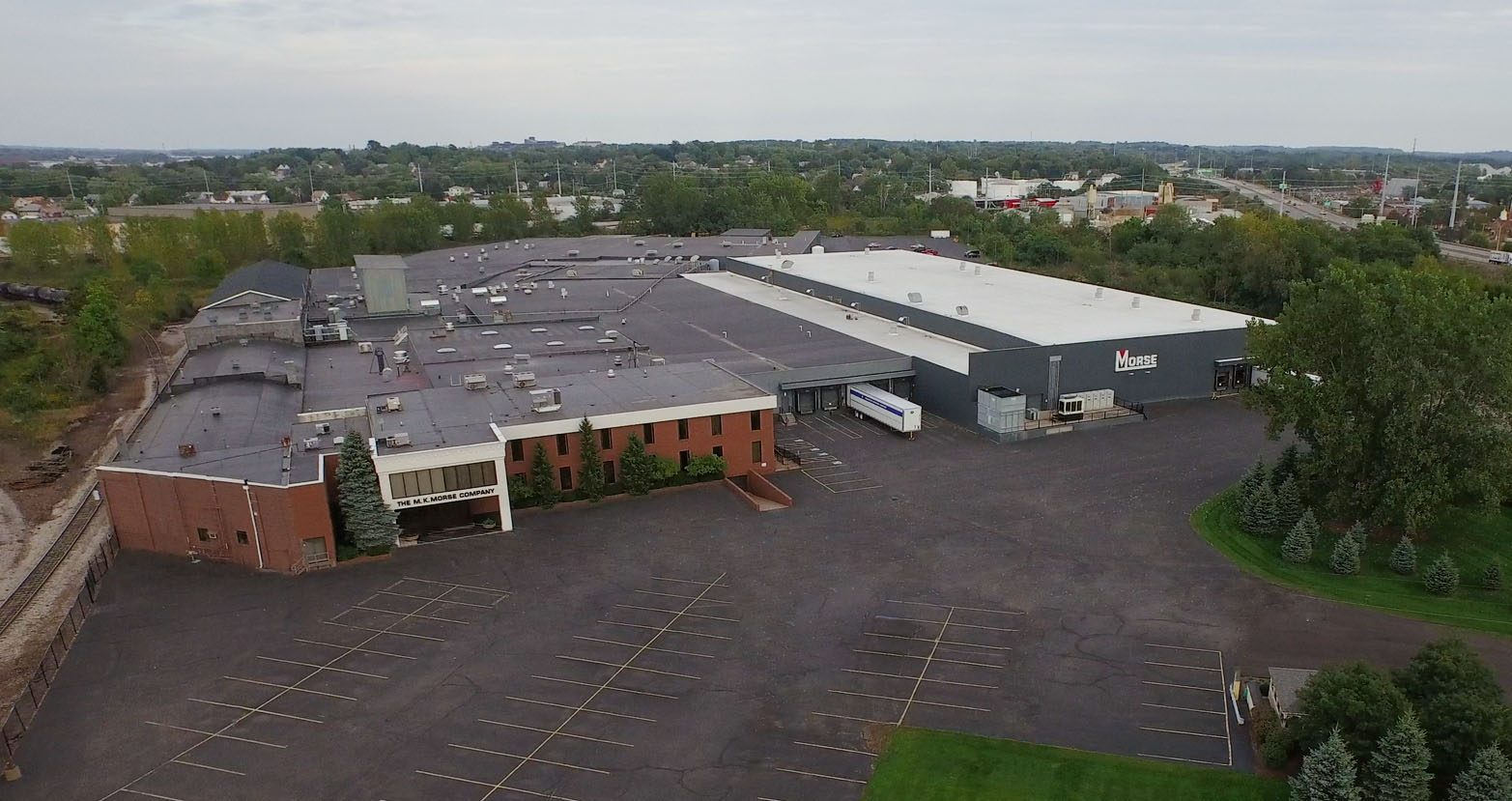
Headquarters of The M. K. Morse Company

On January 26, 1980, a fire burned down Morse's first factory located at 10th Street and High Avenue NW, Canton, Ohio. The headquarters moved into a 450,000 square foot factory in southeast Canton at 1101 11th Street SE.

In 1991, Morse began manufacturing bimetal bandsaw blades, and began opening distribution and weld centers on the West Coast and in the United Kingdom. In 2001, Morse launched the Master Cobalt line of Reciprocating saw blades.

In 2020, Morse launched the Jawbreaker bandsaw blade, designed to cut superalloys and other very hard-to-cut materials. Most band saw blades create the kerf by bending the teeth side to side, which results in premature tooth wear. With this new blade, the kerf is created by precision grinding the tips to a tolerance twice as tight as those used for set tooth blades, resulting in a constant kerf that extends blade life and prevents pinching that can occur as the blade moves through the material.
