= Ridgewood Historic District =

Residential area in Canton, Ohio, US

- U.S. National Register of Historic Places
- U.S. Historic district
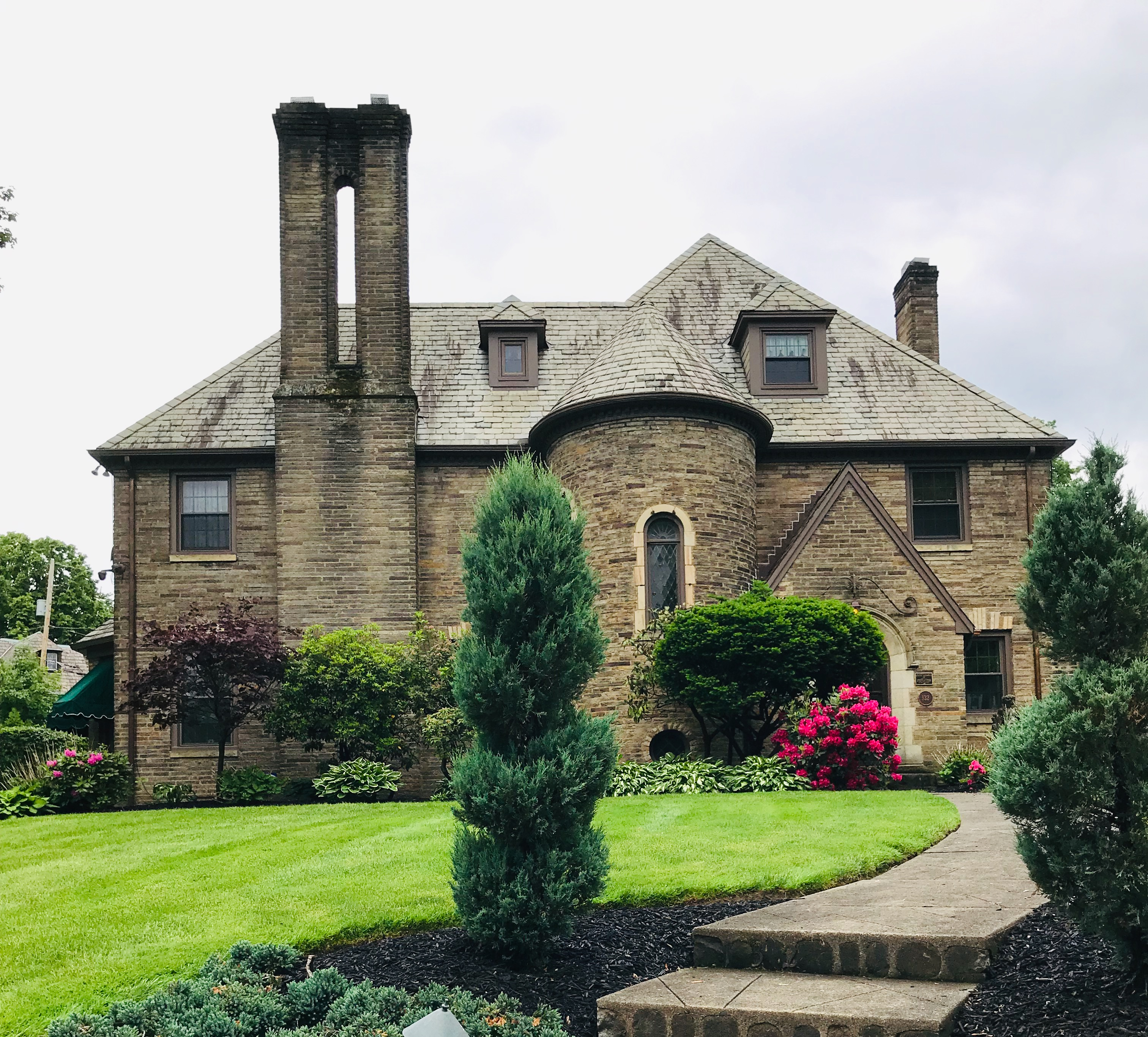
- French Norman Revival Home in Ridgewood, Canton, Ohio

- Location within Ohio Location within the United States
- Location: Canton, Stark County, Ohio
- Coordinates: 40°49′18″N 81°22′14″W
- Area: 2.5 sq mi (6.5 km^{2})
- Built: 1918
- Architectural style: Colonial, Tudor Revival
- NRHP reference No.: 82001489
- Added to NRHP: December 19, 1982

The Ridgewood Historic District is a residential neighborhood in Canton, Ohio. The neighborhood consists of preserved, architect-designed Revival style buildings built in the early 20th century with amenities such as original brick streets and locally produced street lighting standards. The District features homes designed by several distinguished architects, including Charles Firestone, Herman Albrecht, and Louis Hoicowitz. Due to its historic architectural significance, the District was added to the U.S. National Register of Historic Places on December 19, 1982.

== Description ==
The Ridgewood Historic District is an area of residential buildings extending east and west of Market Avenue North, a major north-south artery, in the City of Canton approximately 20 blocks from the center of town. A series of three contiguous allotments, the District was developed by George A. (Jake) Leonard and the Leonard Agency between 1918 and 1940, with the majority of its significant buildings having been erected in the decade 1920 to 1930. The name of Ridgewood is attributed to Mrs. Leonard, who was quite taken with an allotment which she had visited in Springfield, Ohio, called "Ridgewood." Of the 190 buildings in the District, 58 Post World War II buildings provide background. There are no intrusions.

Most of the homes were built between 1919 and the depression. The model for the allotment was a design by John Sherwood (Fritz) Kelly, built in 1919 at 234 19th Street NW. The earliest of the Tudor Revival style homes, built in the same year at 145 19th Street NW, was designed by Herman Albrecht. Over the next decade Albrecht designed more than a dozen homes in the District, as did Charles E. Firestone. J. Kelly, working with his brother-in-law Arthur Brothers, was responsible for nearly two dozen houses in the District.

The District is typical of other such residential areas in that its homes are relatively large, set back from the street and enhanced by mature overhanging trees and lush plantings. While most of its streets are laid out in a grid pattern, University Avenue and 22nd Street NW, and the west portion of 22nd and 24th Streets NE are curved to provide variation in lot shape and vista, and to discourage the use of the streets as thoroughfares. No unsympathetic commercial strips, and no gas stations or parking lots mark the District.

While the buildings were built at more or less the same time, the District exhibits none of the sameness and homogeneity found in post-World War II residential developments. Its buildings are architect-designed for the most part and demonstrate the enormous variations of shape, skin, and sensibility that characterize the European Revival styles favored by a number of architects working in this period. Nor is there skimping in the use of materials and craftsmanship. Windows of beveled and leaded glass, multifaceted roof lines featuring slate in various shapes and hues, hand-cut stone, tapestry brick, gazebos, battlements, and turrets abound, as do variations in cornice treatments featuring the modillions, dentils, and corbelling of the original styles from which these dwellings take their themes. The District's ambiance recalls the quality and substance deemed appropriate in their homes by pre-Depression gentry.

The following are typical examples of buildings found throughout the District:

Tudor Revivals

- Mitchell House (Albrect, Wilhelm, and Kelly, 1921)
- Ball House (J. Kerr Griffen, 1929)
- Giessen House (Charles Firestone, 1928)

All three buildings feature, in various executions, pargetting, leaded and multi-lighted casements, voussoirs, Tudor-arched entries, coursed stone first stories and half-timbered second stories, and potted chimneys in massed arrangements.

French Norman Revivals

- Harris House (John S. Kelly, 1930)
- Fischgrund House (Louis Hoicowitz, 1927)
- Obermeier House (Louis Hoicowitz, 1930)

Both feature wall dormers and window bays, plastered entries, hipped roofs (suggestive, if not directly imitative of the mansard), and multiple roof levels.

Georgian Revivals

- Lavin House (Kelly, 1930)
- Blake House (Albrect and Wilhelm, 1930)

Both feature pedimented entries with fan lights, dentilled cornices, shuttered, double-hung sash windows, brick skins, and other elements appropriate to this type.

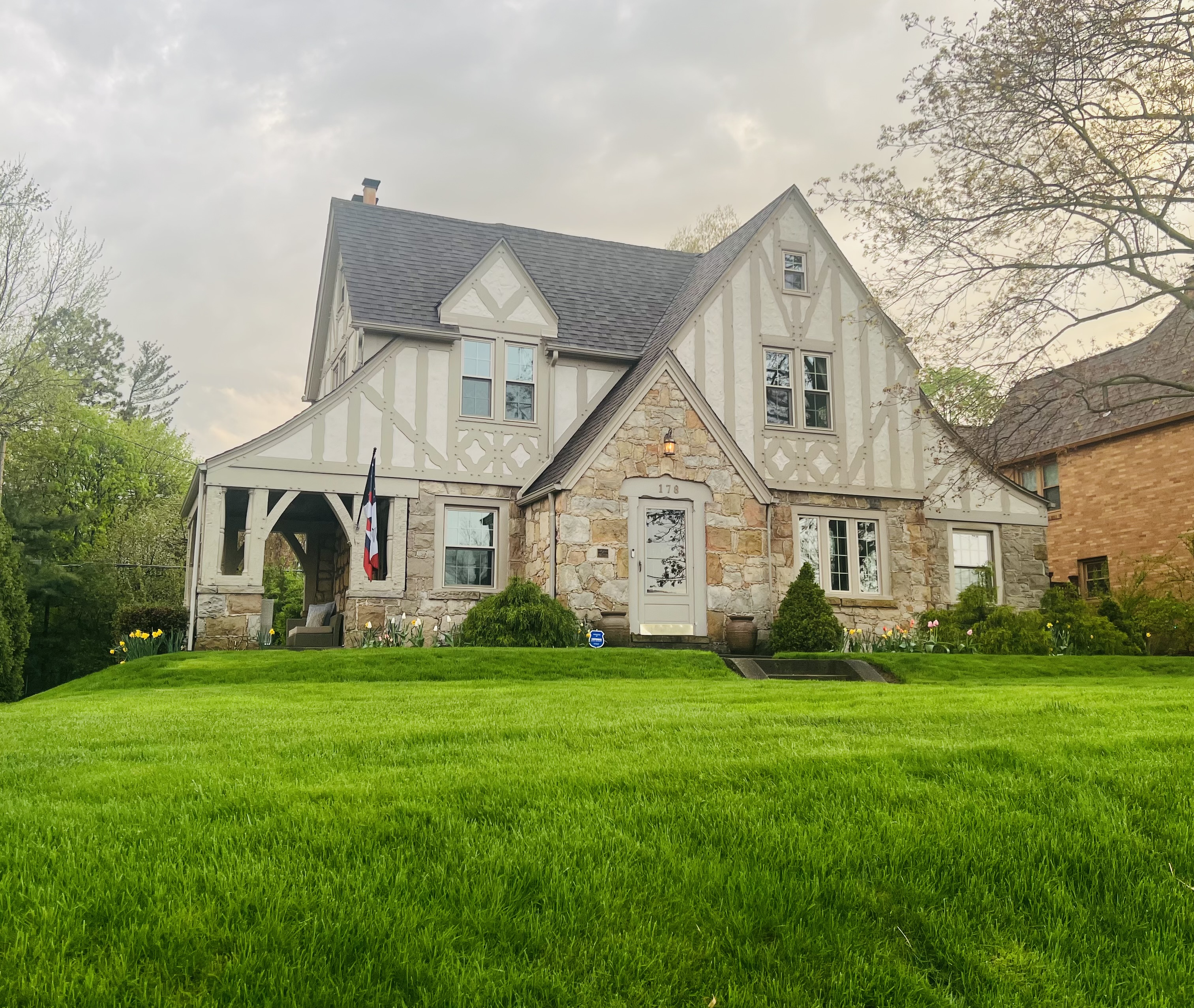
Tudor Revival Home in Ridgewood, Canton Ohio, blt. 1929

In addition to the revival styles of the majority of Ridgewood buildings, several buildings exhibit the transitional features characteristic of the spreading suburban architecture being built in other cities. One such effort, the Fawcett House (John S. Kelly and Arthur Brothers, 1921), was built as a spec house to entice investment in the new allotment. Its rolled roof, suggesting thatch, and its rows of paned casements give its eclecticism a "modern" feeling belying the revival remnants of its Doric-columned entry, arched window moldings suggesting Palladians, and its fan-lighted gable. Another atypical building for the District is the Lehman/Belden House, the earliest house in the area (1890), a substantial vernacular building with Queen Anne and Eastlake elements.

In spite of variations such as these, however, the District has the unified, slightly Europeanized flavor characteristic of other developments of its period, and represents the best in elegant American suburban architecture.

== Significance ==
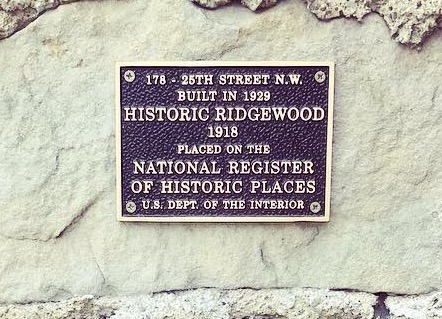
Ridgewood Home Historic Marker

The Ridgewood Historic District is significant in that it is the only residential development in the City of Canton built in this period and featuring the architect-designed Revival style buildings popular in the early 20th century. It is significant, too, in that, through its visual amenities – its locally produced lighting standards and paving materials, and in the fact that many of its buildings were designed by local architectural talent – the District highlights home-produced features of Canton's development and preserves them for the future.

The Ridgewood allotment was platted in several stages between 1918 and 1927 and developed by the Leonard Agency, a subsidiary of which, the Canton Home Site Company, was established to manage the development. The largest portion to the west of Market was once farm land held until 1918 by members of the Martin family, though the parcel had been annexed to the city in 1905-6. The east portion, originally called the Bellwood addition and farmed by residents of the Stark County Poor House, was annexed to the city in 1911.

Except for 25th Street NW, which was paved in 1924 by the city, the remaining streets were paved by private contractors with brick manufactured by Canton's own Metropolitan Paving Brick Company, the largest producer of paving brick in the country. Metropolitan pavers were used in New York's major tunnels and on the Indianapolis speedway. Ridgewood's street lights were manufactured by another Canton firm, Union Metal Manufacturing Company, who built ornamental street lighting standards for first class suburban developments and other uses nation-wide.

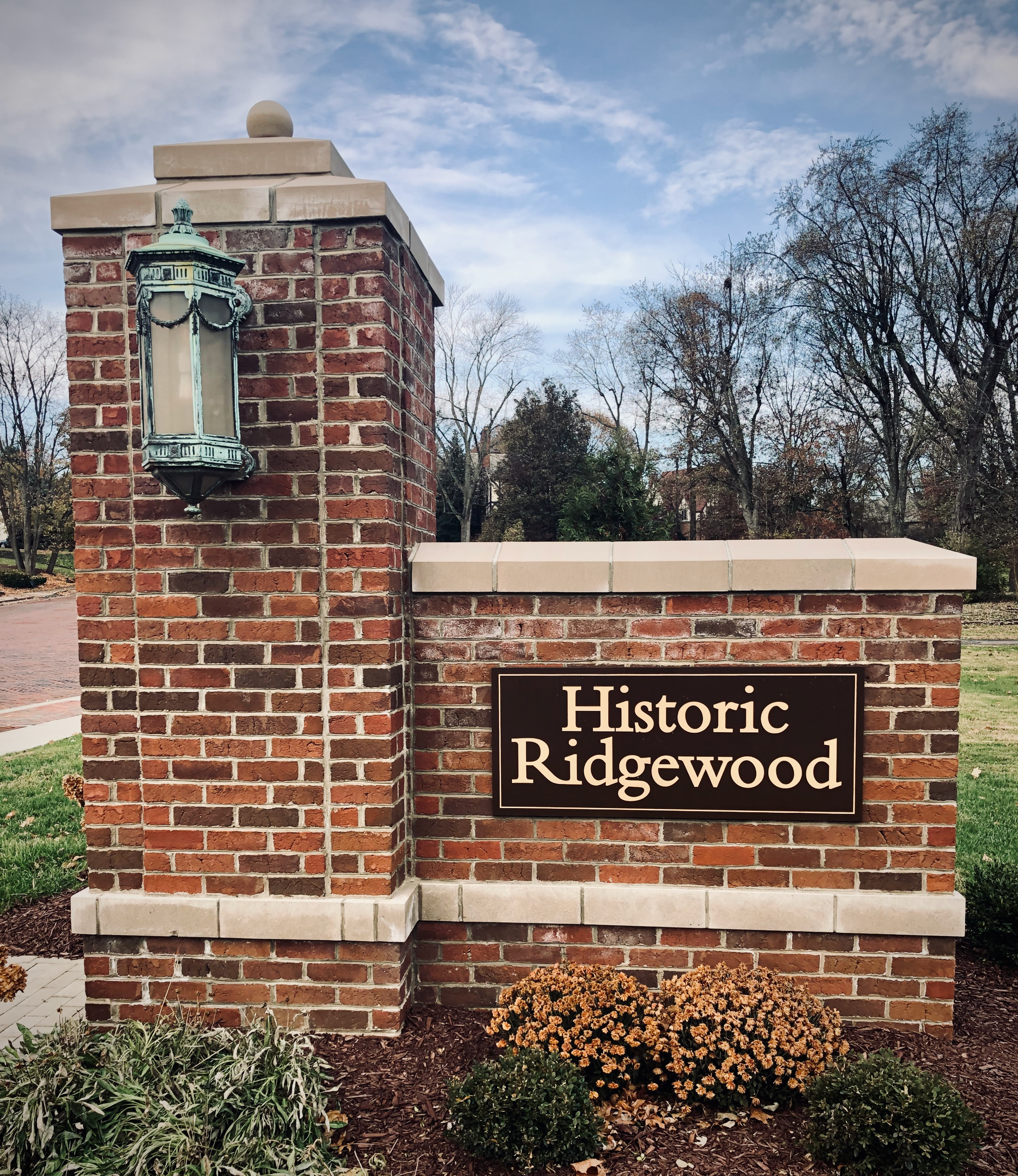
Ridgewood Entrance, 21st St. NW

=== Architecture ===
Several local architects were responsible for the Revival styles which characterize the District.

- Charles E. Firestone, known as Canton's leading architect from 1915 to 1959 and responsible for Timken High School, Fawcett Stadium, the Canton Memorial Civic Center, Molly Stark Hospital, and numerous churches, designed twelve buildings in Ridgewood, three of them for himself.
- Herman Albrect, practicing out of Massillon until 1925 as Albrect, Wilhelm, and Kelly and out of Cleveland and Massillon thereafter as Albrect and Wilhelm, designed 14 buildings in Ridgewood in addition to portions of the Aultman Hospital, the Massillon Museum and Library, and some 36 other Canton residences.
- John Sherwood Kelly, in business for himself after leaving Albrect and Wilhelm in 1925, also did numbers of buildings in northeast Ohio. Teamed with his brother-in-law, contractor Arthur M, Brothers, he designed 18 Ridgewood buildings.
- Louis Hoicowitz, a Russian immigrant who made good in home construction and another of Ridgewood's prolific local builders, designed 13 of what were considered to be the most impressive buildings in the District by virtue of his propensity for turrets.

Ridgewood is a coherent architectural statement announcing Canton's industrial coming-of-age. Its establishment accompanied the event; its buildings embellished it. The architectural significance of the Ridgewood Historic District lies in its initial building period from 1920–1930. It was during this period that Ridgewood's identity, conveyed through its architecture and landscaping, was established. The tree-lined brick-paved streets display Colonial and Tudor Revival Styles as the prevailing architectural choice of Ridgewood homeowners. The architectural continuity can be traced throughout Ridgewood's development from 1920 to 1940 and to a lesser extent in the more recent construction of the last decades.

Residences built from 1930–1940 closely reproduce the variety of materials and surface quality displayed in the earlier Colonial and Tudor Revival style houses dating from 1920–1930. This quality is to such a high degree that the 1930–1940 houses are considered a contributing part of the district . They clearly convey the continuity of architecture present in Ridgewood.

The later buildings – post WWII, 1950s to the present, still retain the basic Colonial and Tudor Revival styles, but the richness of their surface quality is expressed to a lesser degree. These buildings, when viewed in the context of the district, maintain the continuity of Ridgewood architecture and serve as background buildings within the historic district.

=== Residents ===
Among Ridgewood's original residents were members of Canton's corporate elite. Members of the management of Republic Steel lived there as did managers from the two corporations that merged to form it – Berger Manufacturing and United Alloy Steel. Thirteen top executives from the Timken Roller Bearing Company lived in Ridgewood, including two top Timkens, Robert and Henry. A number of the managers of other Canton industries, from stamping and enameling companies to water softener companies, provisioners and rubber companies, were Ridgewood residents as were professionals of all sorts—doctors, lawyers, bankers, and educators.
