= Canton, Ohio =

City in Ohio, United States

- City
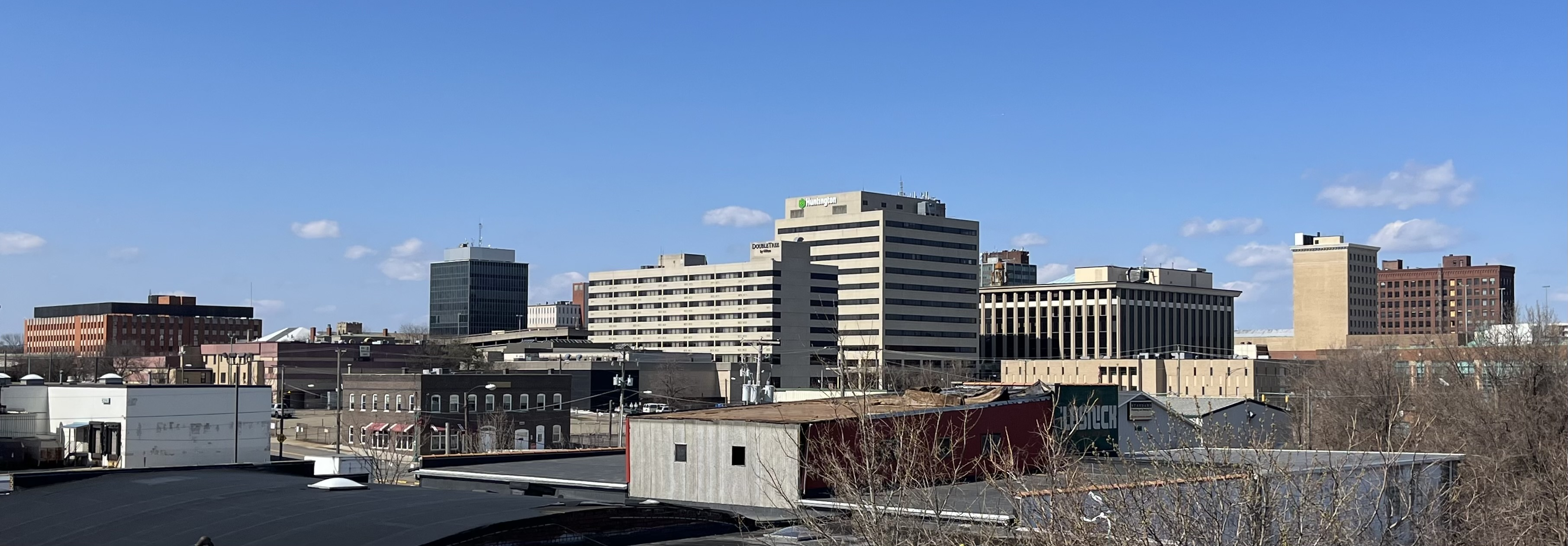
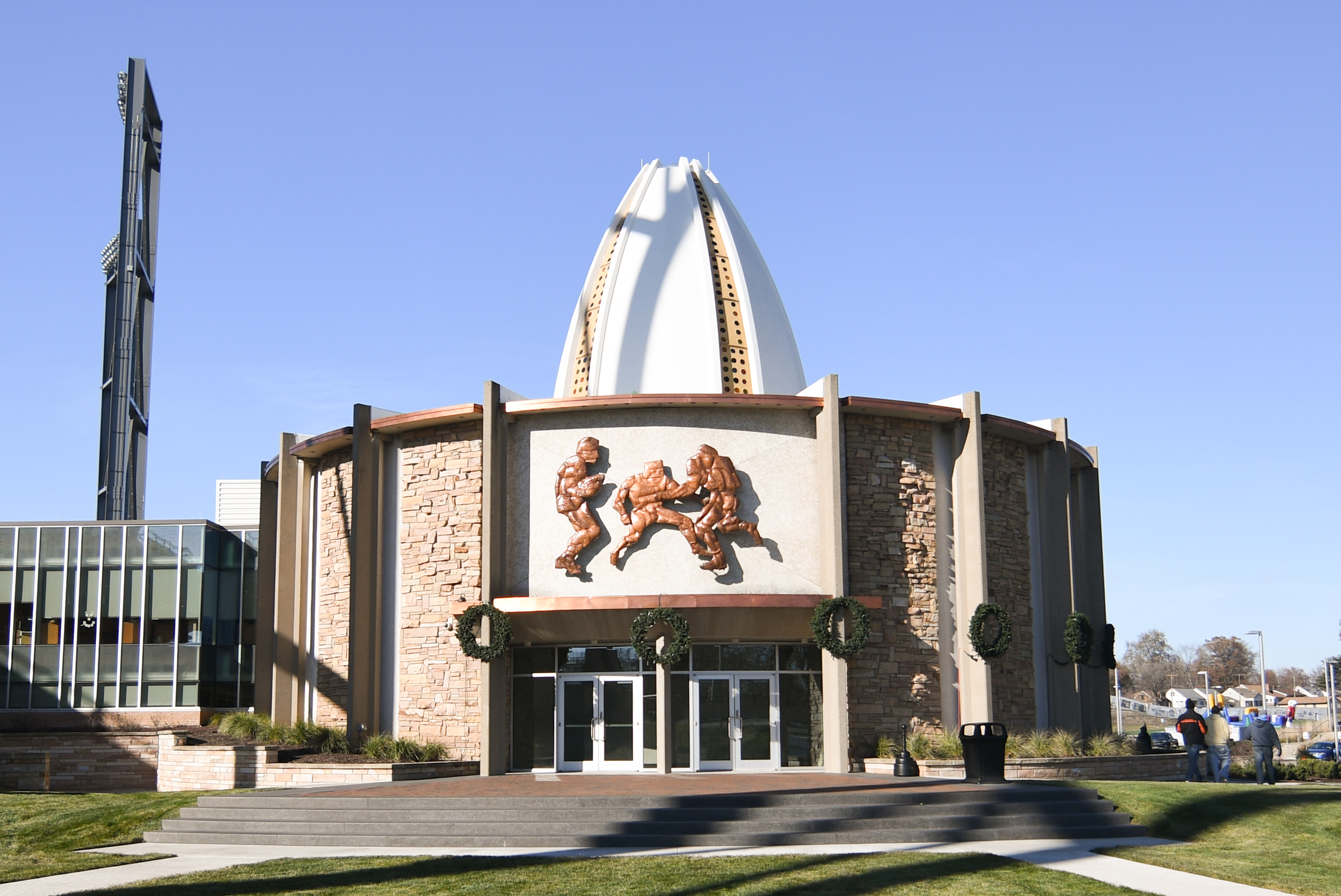
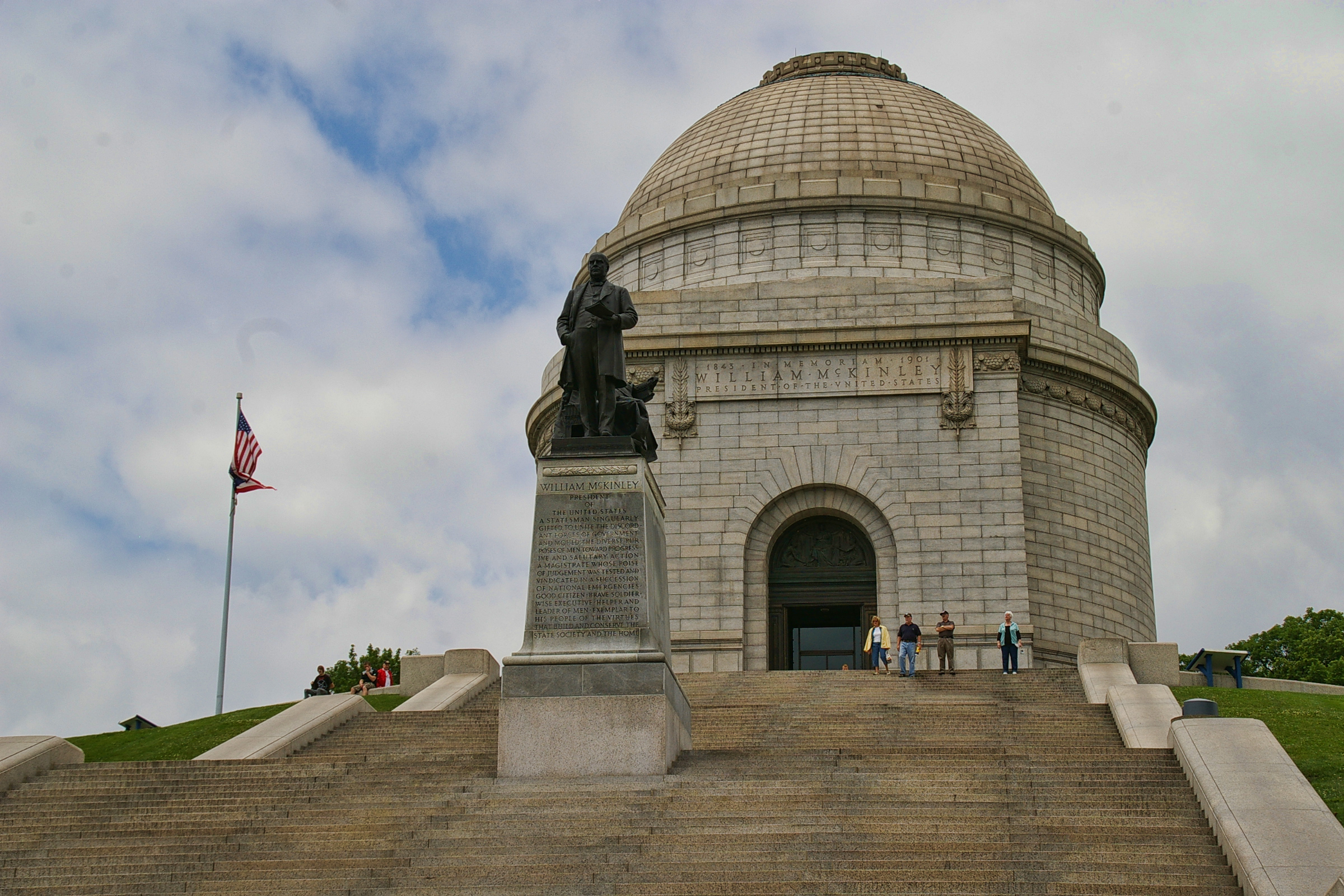
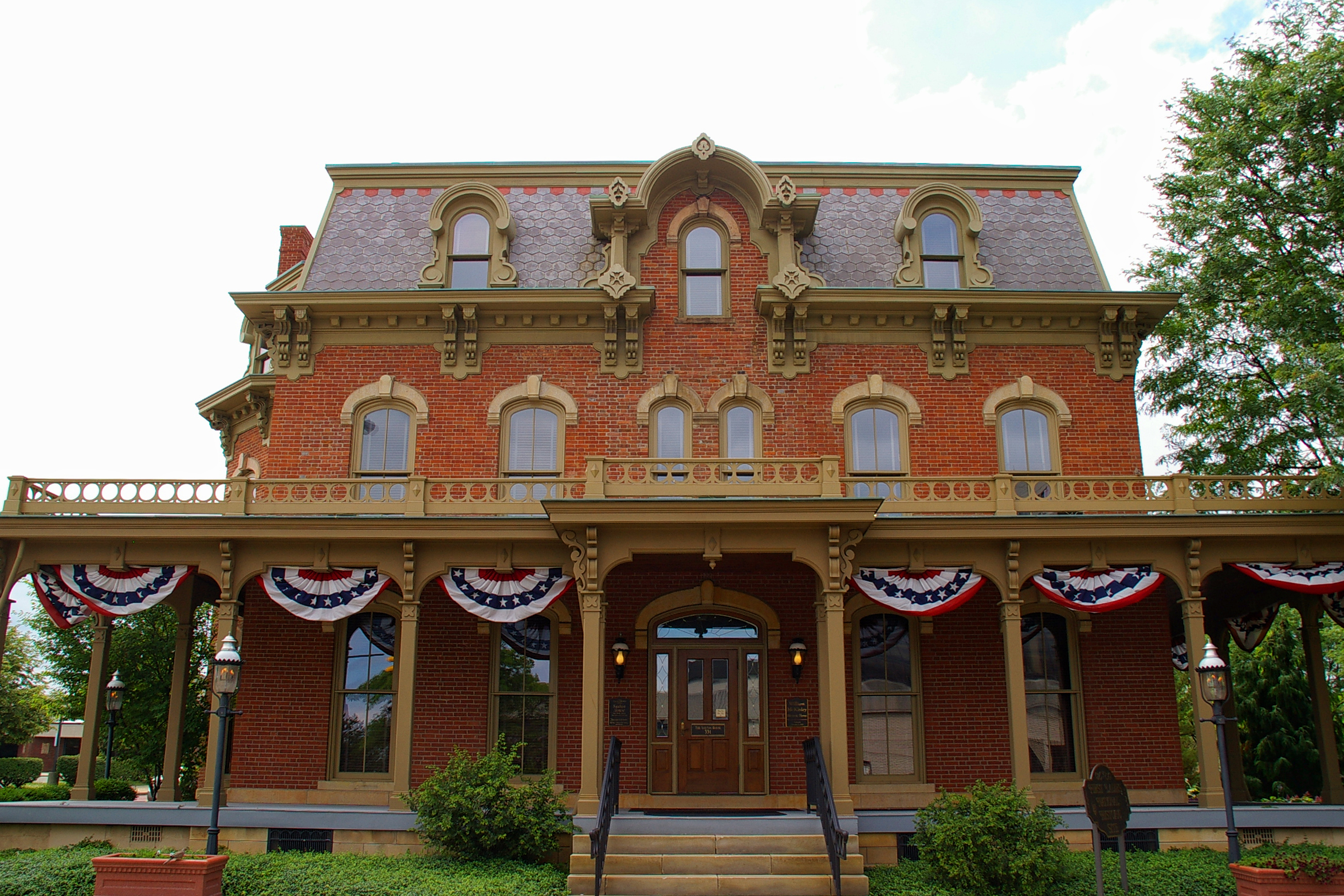
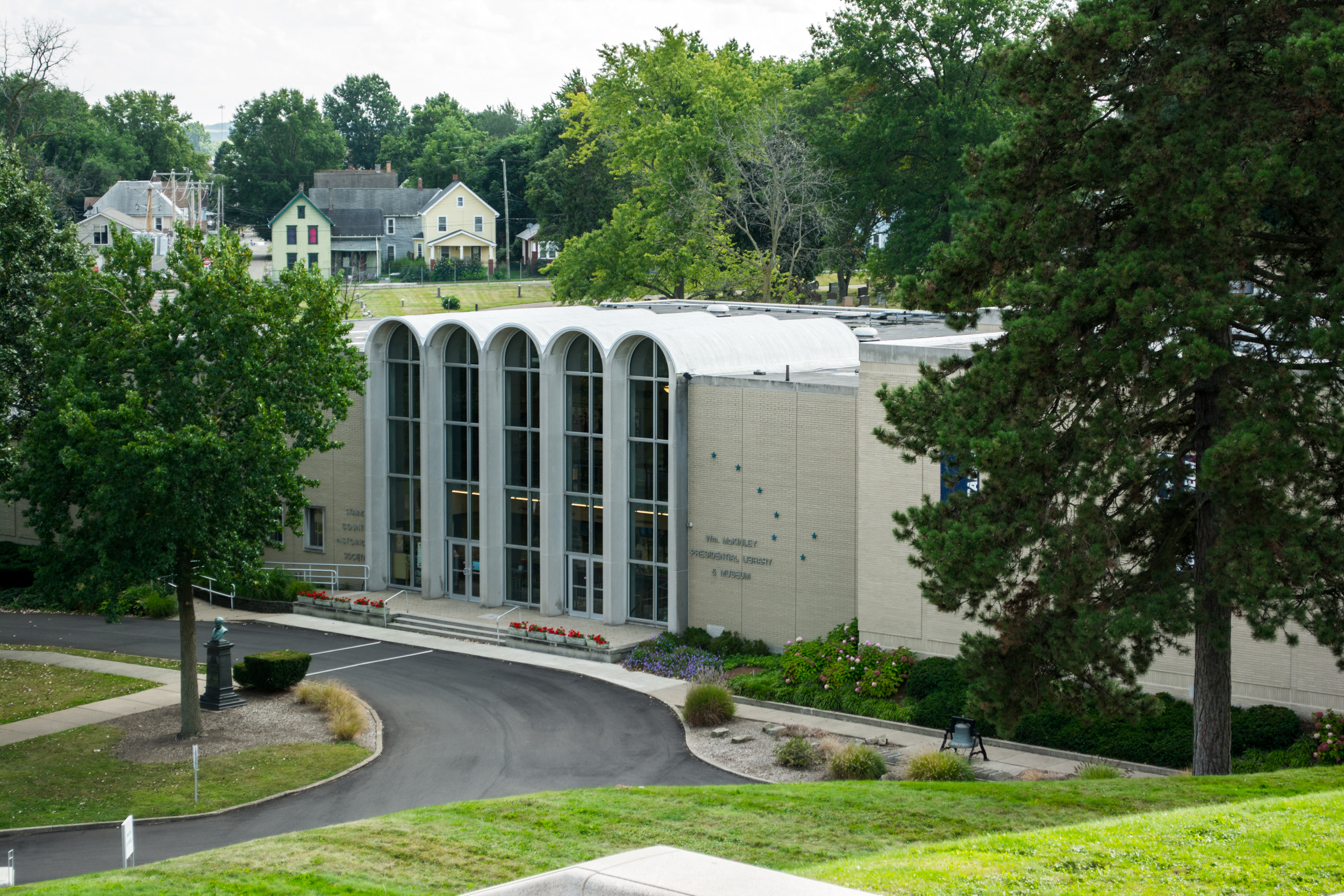
- Downtown Canton Pro Football Hall of Fame McKinley National Memorial First Ladies National Historic Site McKinley Presidential Library

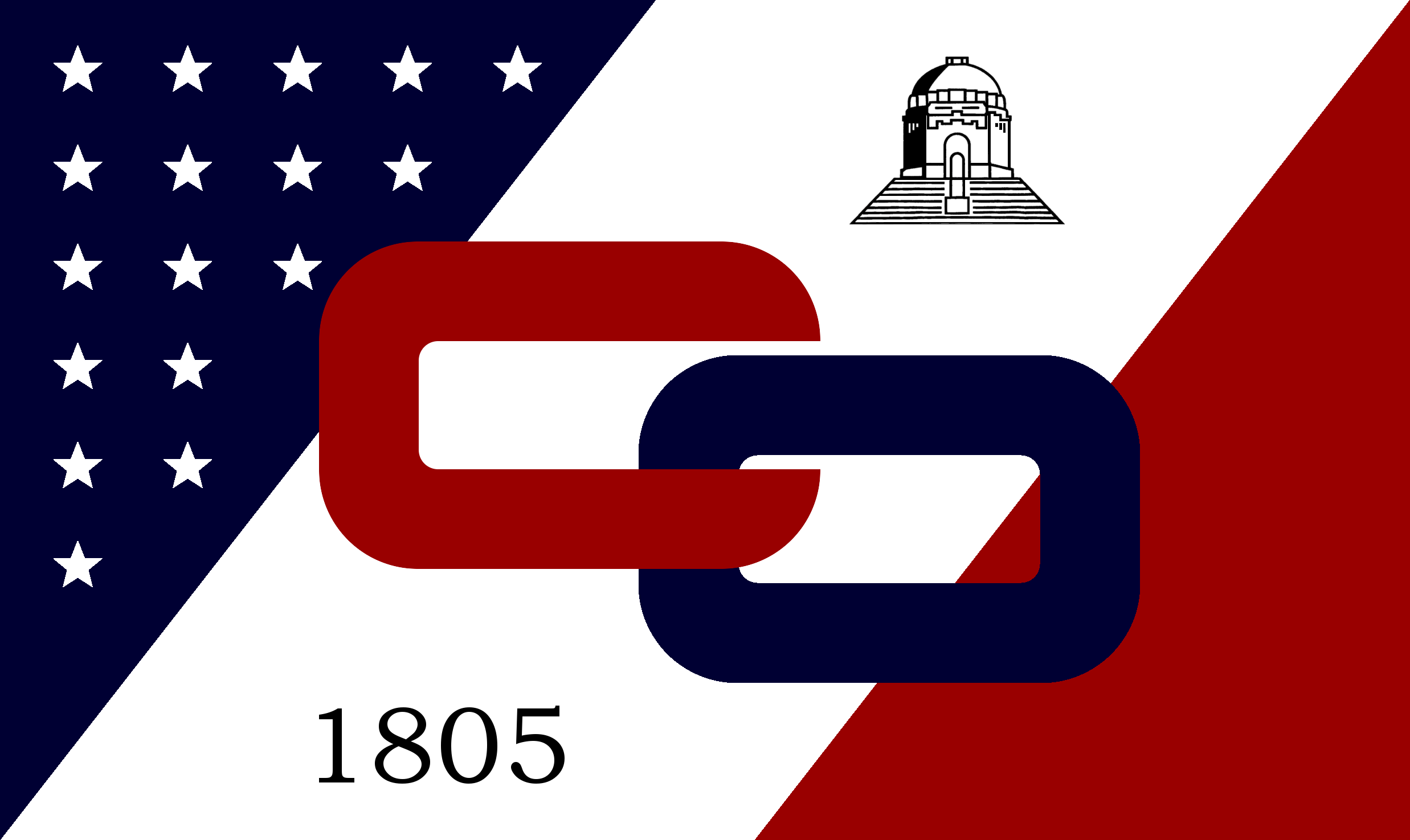
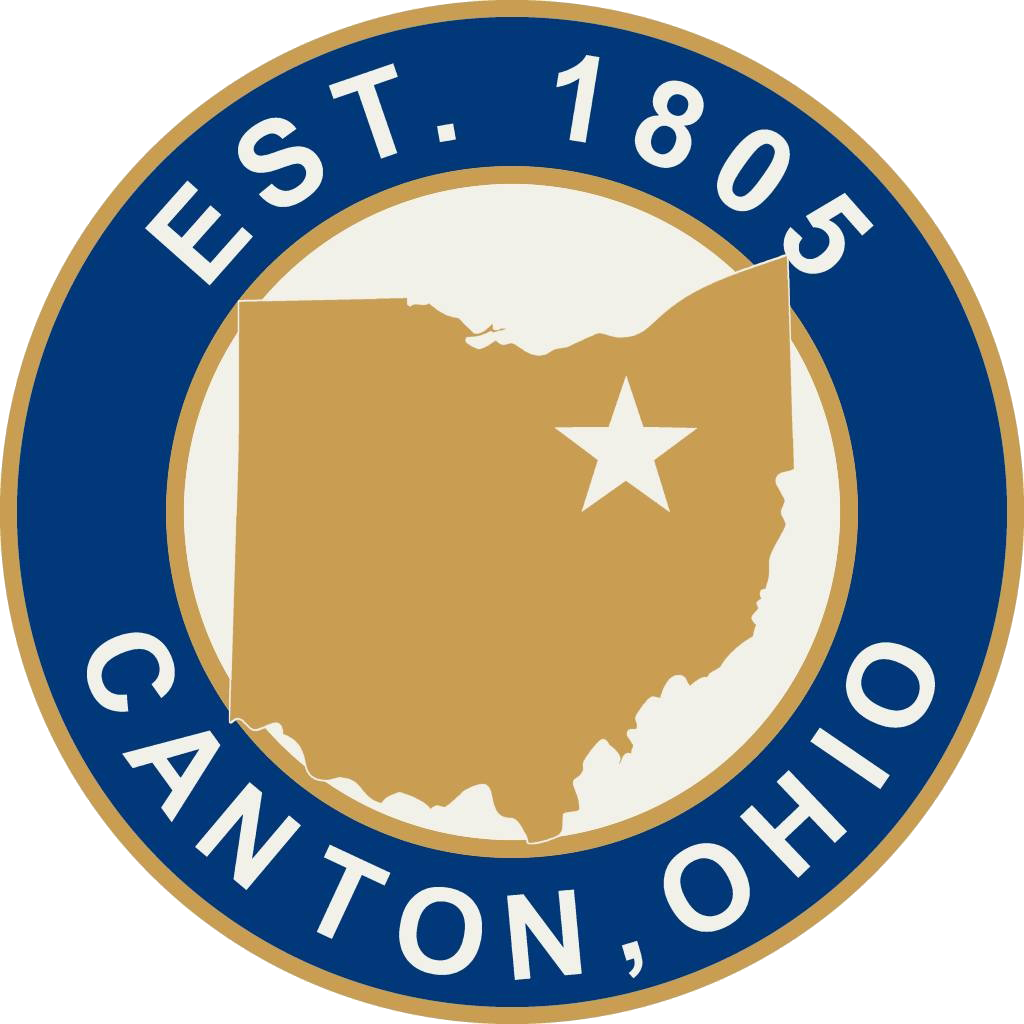
- Flag Seal Logo
- Nickname: Hall of Fame City
- Interactive map of Canton, Ohio
- Location within Ohio Location within the United States
- Coordinates: 40°47′55″N 81°22′30″W
- Country: United States
- State: Ohio
- County: Stark
- Founded: 1805
- Incorporated (village): 1822
- Incorporated (city): 1838
- Named for: Guangzhou, China

Government
  - Type: Mayor–Council
  - Mayor: William V. Sherer II
  - City Council President: Louis Giavasis
  - At Large: Joe Cole; Bill Smuckler
  - Majority leader and Ward 7: John Mariol II
  - Assistant Majority Leader and At large: James Babcock
  - Councilmembers: Darren Mayle (Ward 1); Brenda Kimbrough (Ward 2); Jason Scaglione (Ward 3); Chris Smith (Ward 4); Robert Fisher (Ward 5); J. Nate Cooks (Ward 6); Richard Sacco (Ward 8); Frank Morris (Ward 9)

Area
  - City: 26.327 sq mi (68.187 km^{2})
  - Land: 26.309 sq mi (68.139 km^{2})
  - Water: 0.017 sq mi (0.045 km^{2}) 0.07%
- Elevation: 1,066 ft (325 m)

Population (2020)
  - City: 70,872
  - Estimate (2025): 69,001
  - Rank: US: 563rd OH: 8th
  - Density: 2,693.9/sq mi (1,040.1/km^{2})
  - Urban: 295,319 (US: 137th)
  - Urban density: 1,639/sq mi (632.8/km^{2})
  - Metro: 400,551 (US: 139th)
  - Combined: 3,750,887 (US: 18th)
- Demonym: Cantonian
- Time zone: UTC–5 (Eastern (EST))
  - Summer (DST): UTC–4 (EDT)
- ZIP Codes: 44701–44711, 44714, 44718, 44720–44721, 44730, 44735, 44750, 44767, 44799
- Area codes: 330 and 234
- FIPS code: 39-12000
- Website: cantonohio.gov

Canton (/ˈkæntən/) is a city in Stark County, Ohio, United States, and its county seat. The population was 70,872 at the 2020 census and estimated at 69,001 in 2025, making it the eighth-most populous city in Ohio. The Canton–Massillon metropolitan area had an estimated 400,551 residents in 2024. Canton is located approximately 60 miles (97 km) south of Cleveland and 20 miles (32 km) south of Akron in Northeast Ohio, on the edge of Ohio's Amish Country.

Founded in 1805 alongside Nimishillen Creek, Canton became a center of heavy industry because of its numerous railroad lines. As shifts in the manufacturing industry led to the relocation or downsizing of many factories and workers during the late 20th century, the city's industry diversified into the service economy, including retailing, education, finance and healthcare.

Canton is best known as the home of the Pro Football Hall of Fame and the birthplace of the National Football League. 25th U.S. president William McKinley conducted his famous front porch campaign from his home in Canton, winning the presidency in the 1896 election. The McKinley National Memorial and William McKinley Presidential Library and Museum commemorate his life and presidency. Canton was also selected as the site of the First Ladies National Historic Site largely in honor of his wife, Ida Saxton McKinley.

== History ==
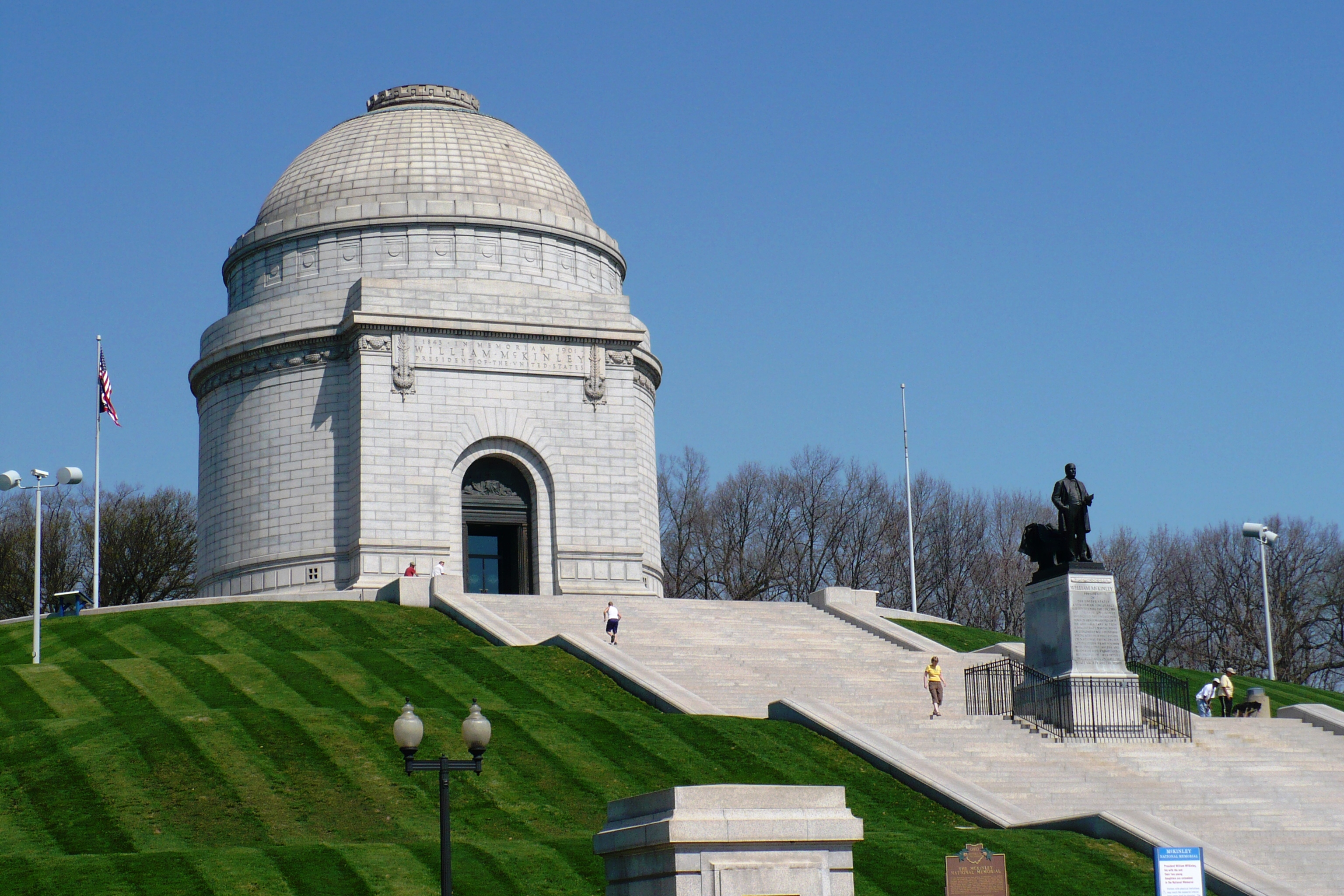
Canton is home to the McKinley National Memorial (pictured) and the McKinley Presidential Library

Canton was founded in 1805 when its plat was recorded at New Lisbon, Ohio, on November 15, 1805, by surveyor Bezaleel Wells, who later served in the Ohio Senate.

Canton was likely named as a memorial to Captain John O'Donnell, an Irish merchant marine with the British East India Company whom Wells admired. O'Donnell named his estate in Maryland after the Chinese port city of Guangzhou, formerly romanized as Canton. O'Donnell was the first person to transport goods from Guangzhou to Baltimore. The name selected by Wells may also have been influenced by the Huguenot use of the word "canton", which meant a division of a district containing several communes.

Through Wells' efforts and promotion, Canton was designated the county seat of Stark County upon its division from Columbiana County in 1809 on January 1. Canton was incorporated as a village in 1822 and reincorporated as a city in 1838. Wells donated his personal holdings in the city to Canton; these holdings would become the Christ United Presbyterian Church, Timken Vocational High School and McKinley Park (originally a cemetery).

=== President William McKinley ===
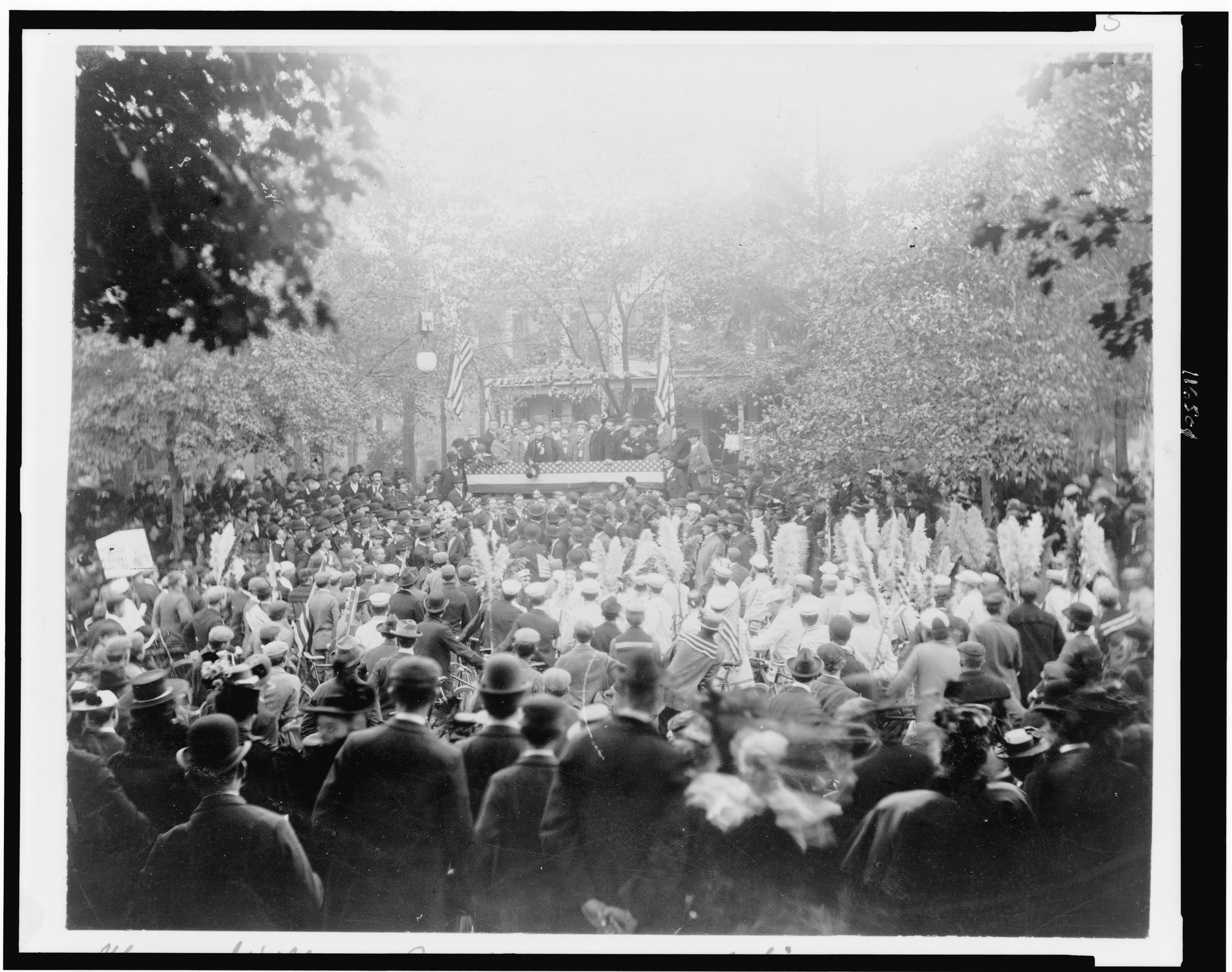
President William McKinley front porch re-election campaign in Canton, 1900

For most of his adult life, Canton was the home of William McKinley, the 25th President of the United States. Born in Niles, Ohio, McKinley first practiced law in Canton around 1867 and was prosecuting attorney of Stark County from 1869 to 1871. The city was his home during his successful campaign for Ohio governor, the site of his front-porch presidential campaign of 1896 and the campaign of 1900. Canton is now the site of the William McKinley Presidential Library and Museum and the McKinley National Memorial, dedicated in 1907.

President McKinley's impact on Canton as his adopted home is still reflected today in many different ways, and he remains the namesake of McKinley Senior High School of the Canton City School System.

=== Debs's antiwar speech ===
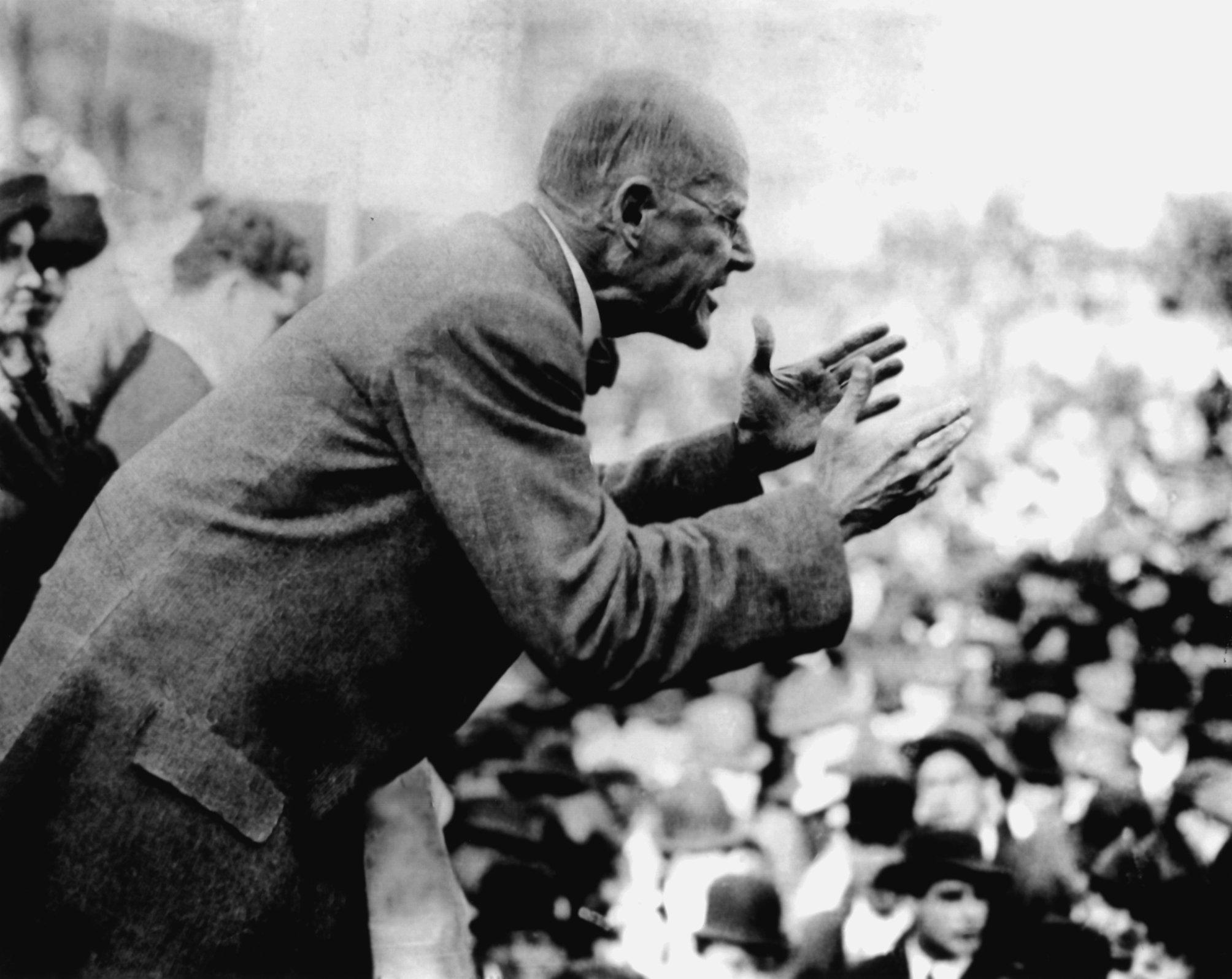
Eugene V. Debs speaking in Canton, 1918

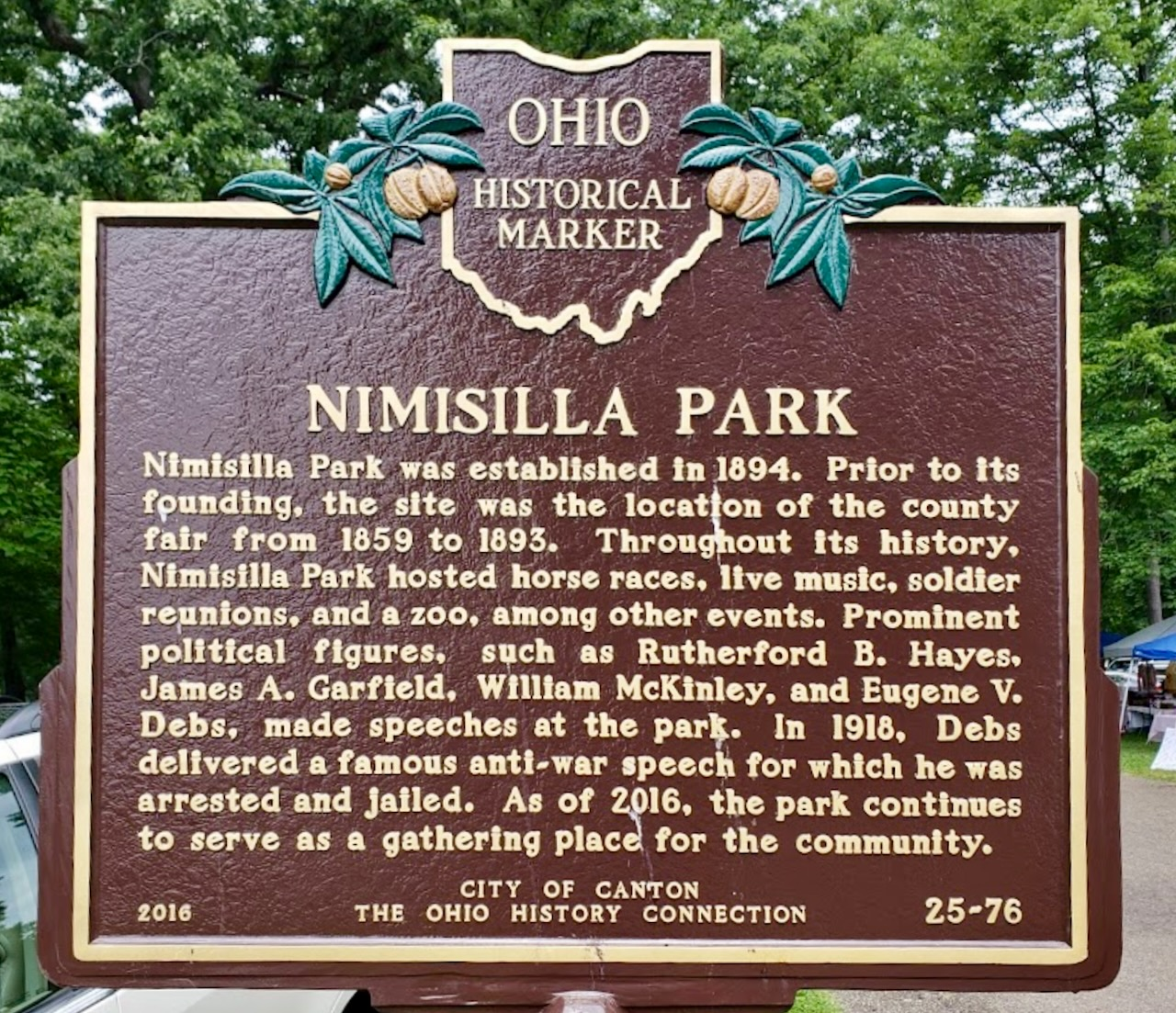
Ohio Historical Marker for Debs' Anti War Speech at Nimisilla Park

On June 16, 1918, Eugene V. Debs delivered the keynote speech at the annual Ohio Socialist Convention held in Canton's Nimisilla Park. At the time, Debs had been a four-time candidate for president and was considered the country's leading socialist and labor organizer. During his speech he decried America's involvement in the First World War, saying, "They have always taught you that it is your patriotic duty to go to war and slaughter yourselves at their command. You have never had a voice in the war. The working class who make the sacrifices, who shed the blood, have never yet had a voice in declaring war." Among Debs' audience at Nimisilla Park were agents of the U.S. Department of Justice.

On June 30, 1918, Debs was arrested and charged with, among other things, "unlawfully, willfully and feloniously cause and attempt to cause and incite and attempt to incite, insubordination, disloyalty, mutiny and refusal of duty, in the military and naval forces of the United States" under the Espionage Act of 1917. Debs' trial began on September 10, 1918, in the U.S. District Court for the Northern District of Ohio. On September 12, 1918, a jury found Debs guilty. He was sentenced to ten years in prison. On March 10, 1919, the U.S. Supreme Court affirmed the constitutionality of Debs' conviction in Debs v. United States. Debs began serving his prison sentence on April 13, 1919, and remained incarcerated until December 25, 1921, when he was released after President Warren Harding commuted his sentence to time served.

The U.S. Supreme Court's decision affirming Debs' conviction was sharply criticized by legal scholars at the time and is generally regarded as a low point in First Amendment jurisprudence. The lead author of the opinion, progressive Supreme Court Justice Oliver Wendell Holmes, later changed course that same term and authored a dissenting opinion recognizing the constitutional protection of such speech in Abrams v. United States. Justice Louis D. Brandeis was the only other jurist to join Justice Holmes' dissent, and the minority opinion had no effect on Debs' conviction and continued incarceration. The changed mind articulated by Justice Holmes on November 10, 1919, nevertheless had a profound impact on the development of American constitutional law. His dissent in Abrams is considered by many legal scholars to be the canonical affirmation of free speech in the United States.

While Debs' speech in Canton and subsequent conviction ultimately aided Debs in delivering the Socialist Party's antiwar platform, his age and the deleterious effects of prison exhausted his ability as an orator. Debs died of heart failure on October 20, 1926. His obituary in The New York Times recounted his words from the Ohio federal courtroom. "At his trial he admitted the charges against him, declaring he would not retract a word he had uttered to save himself from going to the penitentiary for the rest of his days. Before the sentence was passed on him, Debs said to the Court:

Your Honor, years ago I recognized my kinship with all living beings, and I made up my mind that I was not one bit better than the meanest on earth. I said then, and I say now, that while there is a lower class I am in it; while there is a criminal element I am of it; while there is a soul in prison I am not free.

In June 2017 Canton applied for and received a historical marker from the Ohio History Connection, formerly the Ohio Historical Society. The marker is located next to where Debs stood in Canton on the afternoon of June 16, 1918. It commemorates the significance and legacy of his speech at Nimisilla Park, notes the many speeches at the park by other prominent historical figures, and honors the park's continued importance as a gathering place for the community.

=== Major companies ===
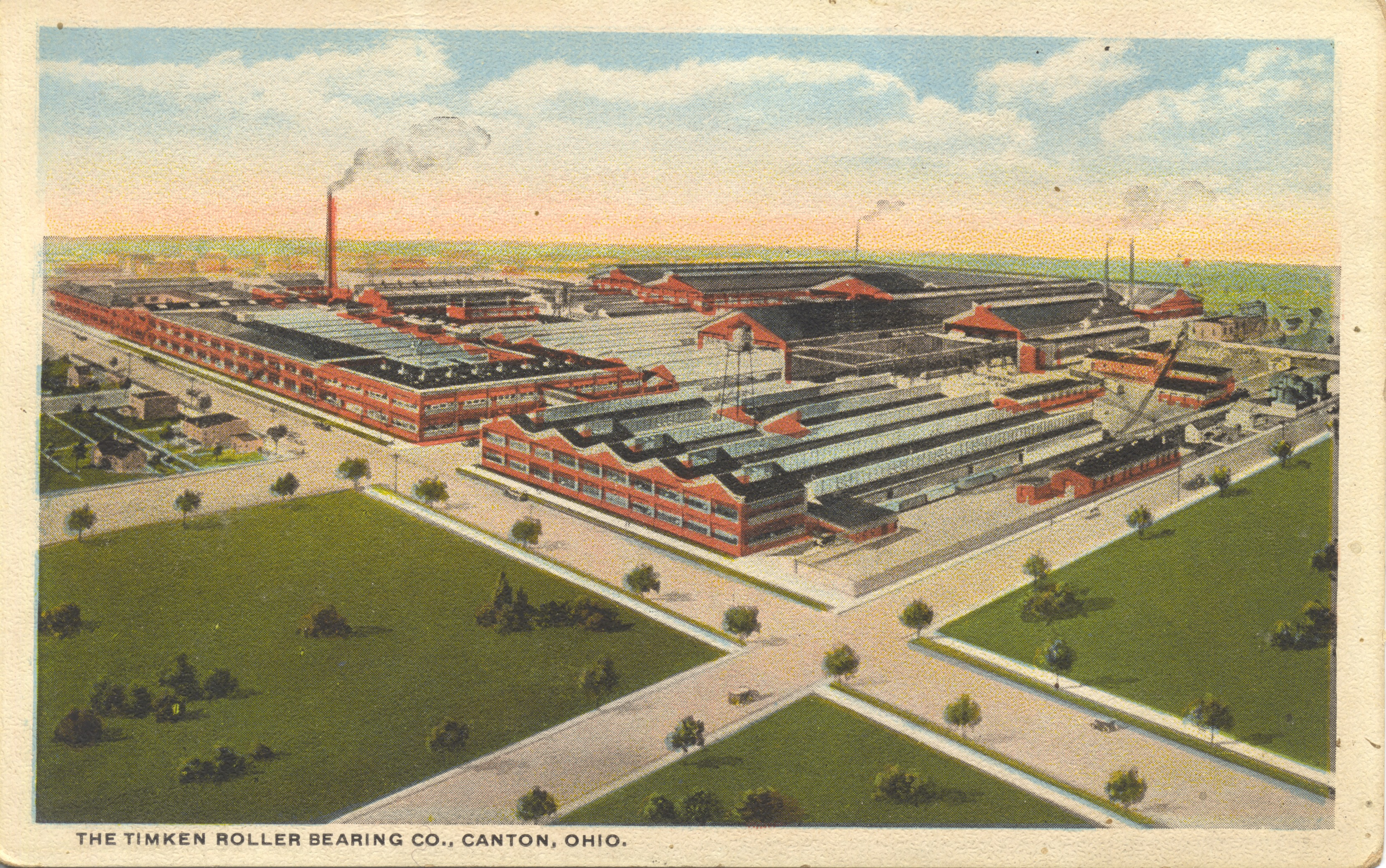
Timken Roller Bearing Co., 1922

The Timken Company has been among the largest employers in Canton for nearly 100 years. In 1898, Henry Timken obtained a patent for the tapered roller bearing, and in 1899 incorporated as the Timken Roller Bearing Axle Company in St. Louis. In 1901, the company moved to Canton as the automobile industry began to overtake the carriage industry. Timken and his two sons chose this location because of its proximity to the American car manufacturing centers of Detroit and Cleveland and the American steel-making centers of Pittsburgh and Cleveland. By 1960, Timken had operations in the U.S., Canada, Great Britain, France, South Africa, Australia and Brazil. The company changed its corporate structure in 2014; the roller bearing-producing part of the company was separated from the steel-producing part of the company, resulting in two separate companies. The Timken Company continues to manufacture roller bearings, while TimkenSteel produces steel.

Today, TimkenSteel remains headquartered in Canton and employs 2,800 people, most of them in Northeast Ohio. The company makes special bar quality steel, used in applications all over the world. The Timken Co. is now headquartered in Jackson Township, a suburb of Canton, and employs 14,000 people around the world. The company designs, engineers, manufactures and sells bearings, transmissions, gearboxes, chain and related products, and offers a spectrum of power system rebuild and repair services around the globe.

The Dueber-Hampden Watch Company was an important employer in Canton during the early 1920s. It was formally organized in 1923, having previously consisted of two separate companies: the Dueber Watch Case Company and the Hampden Watch Company. In 1886, John Dueber, the owner of the Dueber Watch Case Company, purchased a controlling interest in the Hampden Watch Company. In 1888, he relocated the Hampden Watch Company from Springfield, Massachusetts and the Dueber Watch Case Company from Newport, Kentucky to Canton, Ohio. These two companies shared manufacturing facilities in Canton but remained two separate companies. The Dueber Watch Case Company and the Hampden Watch Company quickly became two of Canton's largest employers. In 1888, the companies' first year in Canton, they employed 2,300 Canton residents. In 1890, Canton's population was 26,337. Thanks to these two companies, Canton became an important center for watch manufacturing in the United States. In 1927 the company went bankrupt, finally ceasing operations in the city in 1930. The machinery and tools were sold to the Amtorg Trading Corporation, one of Soviet Russia's buying agencies in the US, for $329.000. The company's massive brick factories, which covered over 20 acres and included an ornate 150-foot clock tower, were demolished to accommodate the construction of Interstate 77.

=== Football history ===
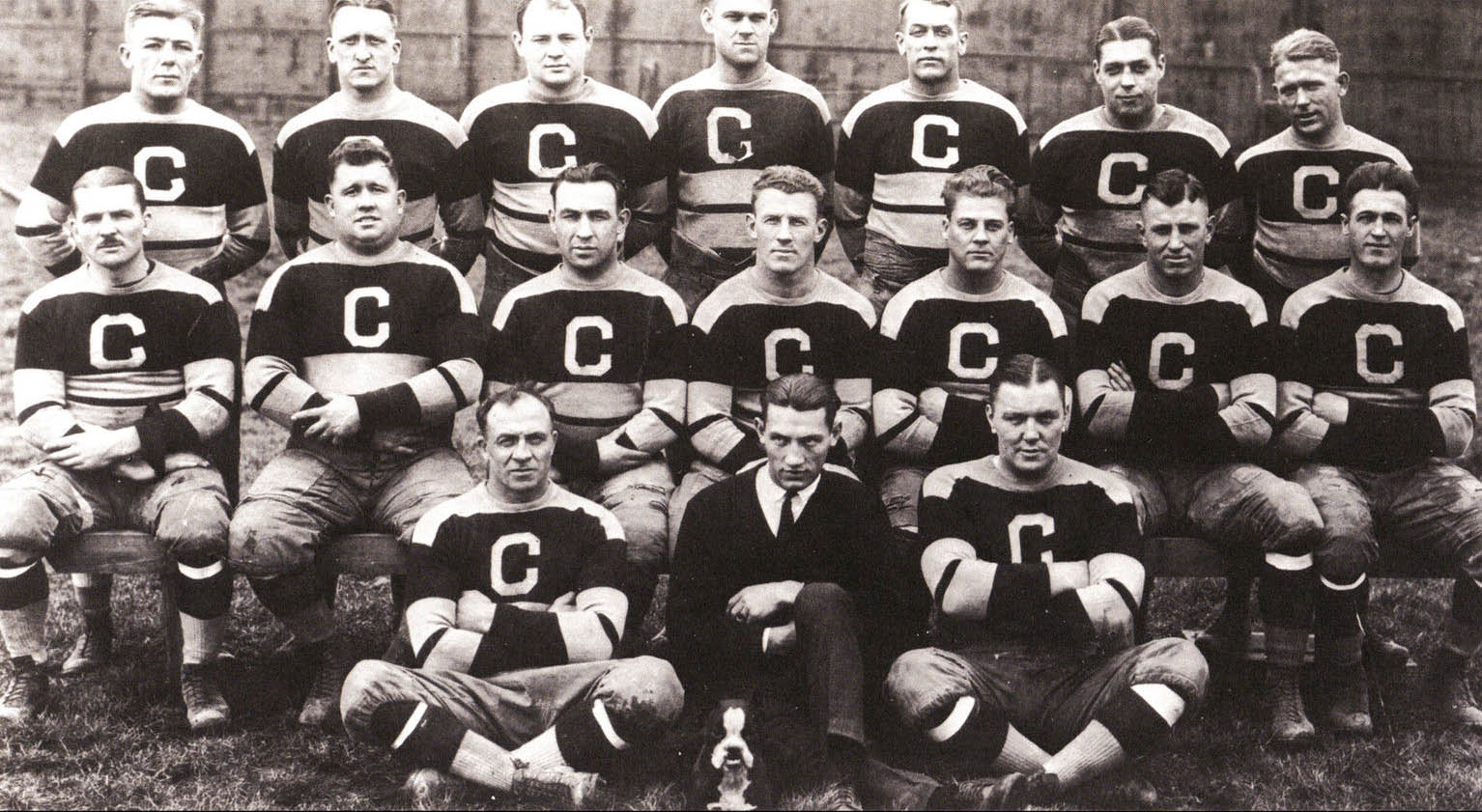
The 1923 Canton Bulldogs were NFL champions

On September 17, 1920, a meeting was held at the Hupmobile showroom in the Independent Order of Odd Fellows Building in Canton to found the American Professional Football Association (renamed the National Football League in 1922). The attendees included Ralph Hay, owner of the Hupmobile showroom and the hometown Canton Bulldogs, and George Halas, owner of the Decatur Staleys. Jim Thorpe of the Bulldogs was the league's first president. In 2014 a sculpture titled Birth of the NFL was erected in downtown Canton marking the exact location in the Hupmobile showroom where the NFL was created in 1920.

On December 6, 1959, the Canton Repository, a local newspaper, called for city officials to lobby the National Football League to create a football hall of fame in the community. Canton officials formally proposed their city as the site for the Hall of Fame in 1961. The NFL quickly agreed to the city's proposal. To help convince NFL officials to locate the Hall of Fame in Canton, city officials donated several acres of land on Canton's north side to the project. Local residents also raised almost $400,000 to help construct the Hall of Fame.

The Pro Football Hall of Fame formally opened on September 7, 1963. Initially, the museum consisted of two buildings, but in 1971, 1978, 1995, and 2013, the Pro Football Hall of Fame experienced several expansions. As of 2013, the museum consisted of five buildings, covering 118,000 square feet. Since its founding, over 10 million people have visited the Pro Football Hall of Fame. "Welcome to Canton" is the official way of saying congratulations to a new enshrinee.

=== 21st century ===
Starting in the mid-2010s, Canton began experiencing an urban renaissance, anchored by a growing arts district centrally located in the downtown area. Several historic buildings have been rehabilitated and converted into upscale lofts, attracting hundreds of new downtown residents into the city. Furthering this downtown development, in June 2016, Canton became one of the first cities in Ohio to allow the open consumption of alcoholic beverages in a "designated outdoor refreshment area" pursuant to a state law enacted in 2015.

== Geography ==
=== Topography ===
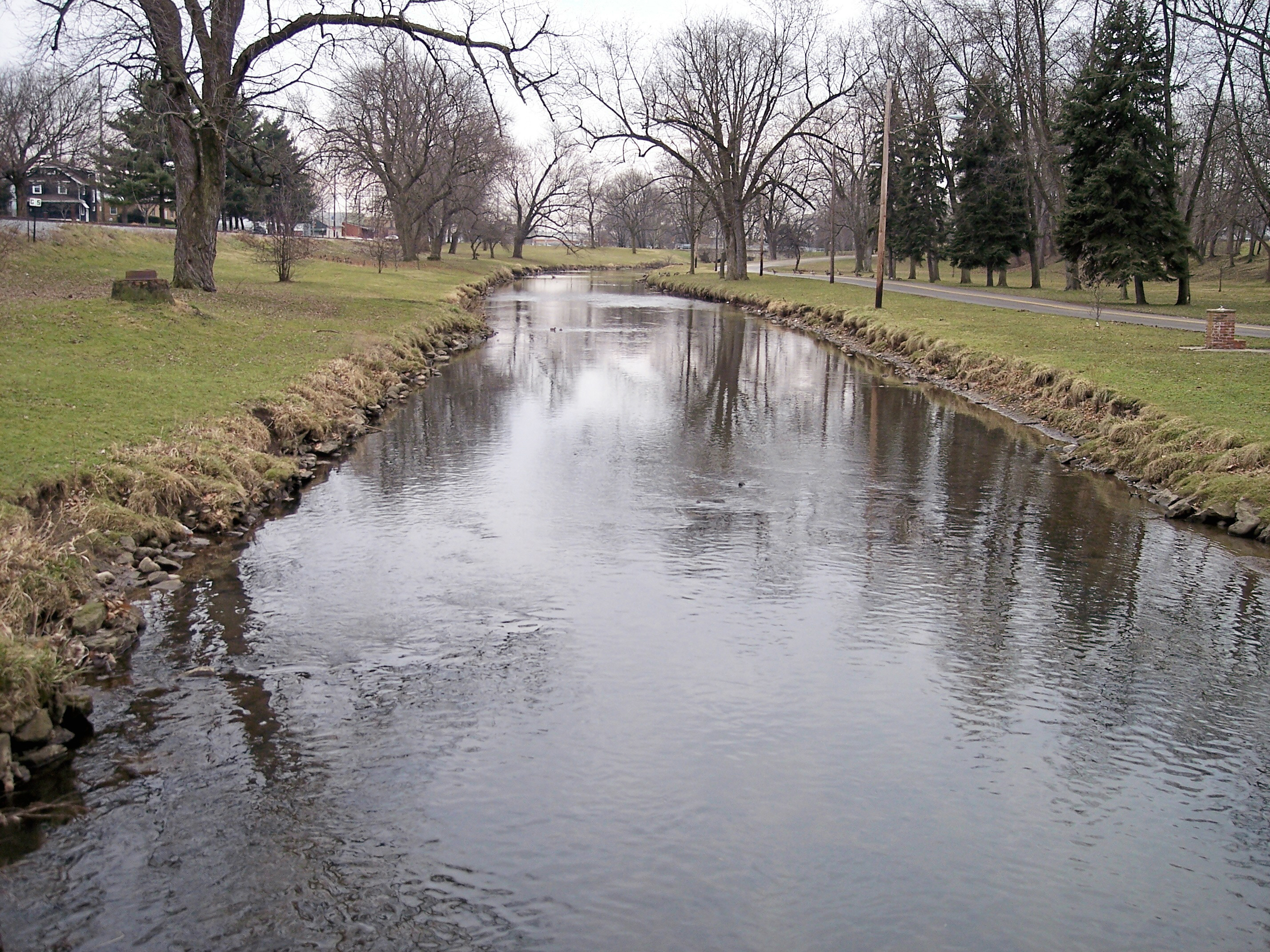
Nimishillen Creek

Canton is located at an elevation of 1,060 feet (323 m). Nimishillen Creek and its East, Middle and West Branches flow through the city.

Canton is bordered by Plain Township and North Canton to the north, Meyers Lake and Perry Township to the west, Canton Township to the South, and Nimishillen Township, Osnaburg Township and East Canton to the east. Annexations were approved in December 2006 extending Canton's eastern boundary to East Canton's border.

According to the United States Census Bureau, the city has a total area of 26.327 square miles (68.19 km^{2}), of which 26.309 square miles (68.14 km^{2}) is land and 0.018 square miles (0.047 km^{2}) (0.07%) is water.

=== Climate ===
Canton has a humid continental climate (Köppen climate classification Dfa), typical of much of the Midwestern United States, with warm, humid summers and cold winters. Winters tend to be cold, with average January high temperatures of 34 °F (1 °C), and average lows of 19 °F (−7 °C), with considerable variation in temperatures. During a typical January, high temperatures of over 50 °F (10 °C) are just as common as low temperatures of below 0 °F (−18 °C). Snowfall is lighter than the snow belt areas to the north. Akron-Canton Airport generally averages 47.7 inches (121 cm) of snow per season. Springs are short with rapid transition from hard winter to summer weather. Summers tend to be warm, sometimes hot, with average July high temperatures of 83 °F (28 °C), and average July low of 62 °F (17 °C). Summer weather is more stable, generally humid with thunderstorms fairly common. Temperatures reach or exceed 90 °F (32 °C) about 10 times each summer, on average. Fall usually is the driest season with many clear, warm days and cool nights. The all-time record high in the Akron-Canton area of 104 °F (40 °C) was established on August 6, 1918, and the all-time record low of −25 °F (−32 °C) was set on January 19, 1994.

Climate data for Canton, Ohio (Akron–Canton Airport), 1991–2020 normals, extremes 1887–present
Month	Jan	Feb	Mar	Apr	May	Jun	Jul	Aug	Sep	Oct	Nov	Dec	Year
Record high °F (°C)	73 (23)	76 (24)	83 (28)	89 (32)	94 (34)	100 (38)	102 (39)	104 (40)	99 (37)	91 (33)	80 (27)	76 (24)	104 (40)
Mean maximum °F (°C)	58.1 (14.5)	60.1 (15.6)	71.8 (22.1)	80.8 (27.1)	86.7 (30.4)	91.3 (32.9)	92.5 (33.6)	90.6 (32.6)	88.1 (31.2)	79.8 (26.6)	68.1 (20.1)	59.9 (15.5)	93.3 (34.1)
Mean daily maximum °F (°C)	35.5 (1.9)	38.6 (3.7)	48.4 (9.1)	61.8 (16.6)	72.3 (22.4)	80.4 (26.9)	84.3 (29.1)	82.7 (28.2)	75.9 (24.4)	63.4 (17.4)	50.7 (10.4)	39.9 (4.4)	61.2 (16.2)
Daily mean °F (°C)	27.9 (−2.3)	30.2 (−1.0)	38.9 (3.8)	50.8 (10.4)	61.3 (16.3)	69.9 (21.1)	73.9 (23.3)	72.3 (22.4)	65.4 (18.6)	53.7 (12.1)	42.5 (5.8)	33.0 (0.6)	51.7 (10.9)
Mean daily minimum °F (°C)	20.3 (−6.5)	21.9 (−5.6)	29.4 (−1.4)	39.8 (4.3)	50.4 (10.2)	59.4 (15.2)	63.4 (17.4)	61.9 (16.6)	54.9 (12.7)	44.0 (6.7)	34.2 (1.2)	26.1 (−3.3)	42.1 (5.6)
Mean minimum °F (°C)	−1.3 (−18.5)	3.1 (−16.1)	11.0 (−11.7)	24.3 (−4.3)	35.5 (1.9)	44.8 (7.1)	52.6 (11.4)	51.2 (10.7)	41.1 (5.1)	30.4 (−0.9)	19.3 (−7.1)	8.2 (−13.2)	−3.5 (−19.7)
Record low °F (°C)	−25 (−32)	−20 (−29)	−6 (−21)	10 (−12)	24 (−4)	32 (0)	41 (5)	39 (4)	29 (−2)	20 (−7)	−1 (−18)	−16 (−27)	−25 (−32)
Average precipitation inches (mm)	2.92 (74)	2.44 (62)	3.23 (82)	3.86 (98)	4.13 (105)	4.43 (113)	4.14 (105)	3.61 (92)	3.50 (89)	3.34 (85)	3.08 (78)	2.89 (73)	41.57 (1,056)
Average snowfall inches (cm)	13.4 (34)	12.0 (30)	7.6 (19)	1.7 (4.3)	0.0 (0.0)	0.0 (0.0)	0.0 (0.0)	0.0 (0.0)	0.0 (0.0)	0.3 (0.76)	3.3 (8.4)	8.9 (23)	47.2 (120)
Average precipitation days (≥ 0.01 in)	17.8	14.5	14.2	14.6	14.1	12.4	11.8	10.1	9.9	12.0	12.5	16.0	159.9
Average snowy days (≥ 0.1 in)	13.3	10.0	6.7	2.0	0.0	0.0	0.0	0.0	0.0	0.4	3.4	9.5	45.3
Source: NOAA

=== Address system ===
Canton's street layout forms the basis for the system of addresses in Stark County. Canton proper is divided into address quadrants (NW, NE, SW, SE) by Tuscarawas Street (dividing N and S) and Market Avenue (dividing E and W). Due to shifts in the street layout, the E–W divider becomes Cleveland Avenue south of the city, merging onto Ridge Road farther out. The directionals are noted as suffixes to the street name (e.g. Tuscarawas St W, 55th Street NE). Typically within the city numbered streets run east and west and radiate from the Tuscarawas Street baseline, while named avenues run north and south.

=== Neighborhoods ===
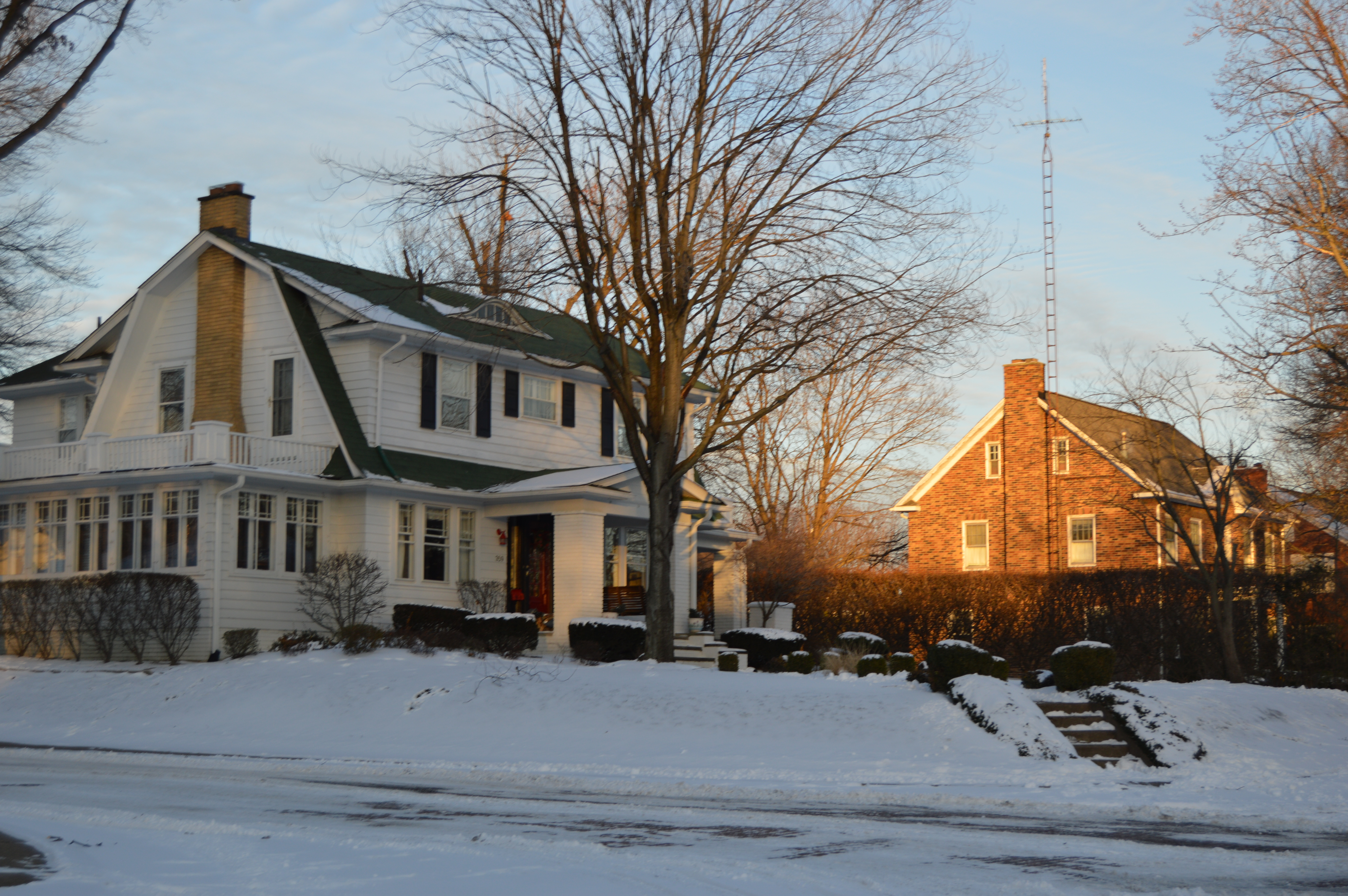
Houses at the corner of Yale Avenue and 22nd Street in the Ridgewood Historic District

- Applecrest
- Avondale
- Colonial Heights
- Crystal Park
- Downtown
- Dueber
- Edgefield
- Gibbs
- Harrison Hills
- Hills and Dales
- Harter Heights
- Lathrop
- Market Heights
- Mt. Vernon
- Ridgewood
- Plain Center Estates
- Sherrick Road Corridor
- Shorb
- Summit
- Vassar Park
- West Branch Park
- West Park
- Westbrook Veterans Memorial Park

The Ridgewood Historic District is a historic residential neighborhood in Canton that, due to its architectural significance, was added to the U.S. National Register of Historic Places on December 19, 1982. The neighborhood consists of preserved, architect-designed Revival style buildings of the Tudor, Georgian, and French-Norman styles built in the early 20th century with amenities such as original brick streets and locally produced street lighting standards. The District features homes designed by several distinguished architects, including Charles Firestone, Herman Albrecht, and Louis Hoicowitz.

== Demographics ==
Historical population
Census	Pop.	Note	%±
1830	1,257		—
1850	2,603		—
1860	4,041		55.2%
1870	8,660		114.3%
1880	12,258		41.5%
1890	26,189		113.6%
1900	30,667		17.1%
1910	50,217		63.7%
1920	87,091		73.4%
1930	104,906		20.5%
1940	108,401		3.3%
1950	116,912		7.9%
1960	113,631		−2.8%
1970	110,053		−3.1%
1980	94,730		−13.9%
1990	84,161		−11.2%
2000	80,806		−4.0%
2010	73,007		−9.7%
2020	70,872		−2.9%
2025 (est.)	69,001		−2.6%
U.S. Decennial Census; 2020 Census

According to realtor website Zillow, the average price of a home as of November 30, 2025, in Canton is $164,993.

As of the 2024 American Community Survey, there are 28,487 estimated households in Canton with an average of 2.36 persons per household. The city has a median household income of $46,320. Approximately 32.2% of the city's population lives at or below the poverty line. Canton has an estimated 56.0% employment rate, with 16.7% of the population holding a bachelor's degree or higher and 90.1% holding a high school diploma. There were 32,425 housing units at an average density of 1,232.47 per square mile (475.9/km^{2}).

The median age in the city was 32.9 years.

=== Racial and ethnic composition ===
Canton, Ohio – racial and ethnic composition Note: the US Census treats Hispanic/Latino as an ethnic category. This table excludes Latinos from the racial categories and assigns them to a separate category. Hispanics/Latinos may be of any race.
Race / ethnicity (NH = non-Hispanic)	Pop. 1990	Pop. 2000	Pop. 2010	Pop. 2020	% 1990	% 2000	% 2010	% 2020
White alone (NH)	67,251	59,653	49,591	43,132	79.91%	73.82%	67.93%	60.86%
Black or African American alone (NH)	15,228	16,875	17,501	17,351	18.09%	20.88%	23.97%	24.48%
Native American or Alaska Native alone (NH)	409	373	274	223	0.49%	0.46%	0.38%	0.31%
Asian alone (NH)	263	253	243	295	0.31%	0.31%	0.33%	0.42%
Pacific Islander alone (NH)	—	18	21	35	—	0.02%	0.03%	0.05%
Other race alone (NH)	121	299	255	610	0.14%	0.37%	0.35%	0.86%
Mixed race or multiracial (NH)	—	2,329	3,223	5,650	—	2.88%	4.41%	7.97%
Hispanic or Latino (any race)	889	1,006	1,899	3,576	1.06%	1.24%	2.60%	5.05%
Total	84,161	80,806	73,007	70,872	100.00%	100.00%	100.00%	100.00%

=== 2024 estimate ===
As of the 2024 estimate, there were 69,211 people, 28,487 households, and _ families residing in the city. The population density was 2,630.70 inhabitants per square mile (1,015.7/km^{2}). There were 32,425 housing units at an average density of 1,232.47 per square mile (475.9/km^{2}). The racial makeup of the city was 62.1% White (60.1% NH White), 24.7% African American, 0.1% Native American, 0.5% Asian, 0.2% Pacific Islander, _% from some other races and 11.4% from two or more races. Hispanic or Latino people of any race were 6.3% of the population.

=== 2020 census ===
As of the 2020 census, there were 70,872 people, 29,959 households, and 16,239 families residing in the city. The median age was 36.5 years; 24.3% of residents were under the age of 18 and 15.5% were 65 years of age or older. For every 100 females there were 92.1 males, and for every 100 females age 18 and over there were 88.1 males age 18 and over.

99.9% of residents lived in urban areas, while 0.1% lived in rural areas.

Of the 29,959 households in Canton, 27.5% had children under the age of 18 living in them. Of all households, 26.1% were married-couple households, 24.9% were households with a male householder and no spouse or partner present, and 39.1% were households with a female householder and no spouse or partner present. About 38.0% of all households were made up of individuals and 13.3% had someone living alone who was 65 years of age or older.

There were 33,587 housing units, of which 10.8% were vacant. Among occupied housing units, 46.2% were owner-occupied and 53.8% were renter-occupied. The homeowner vacancy rate was 2.2% and the rental vacancy rate was 8.7%.

Racial composition as of the 2020 census
Race	Number	Percent
White	43,980	62.1%
Black or African American	17,611	24.8%
American Indian and Alaska Native	479	0.7%
Asian	304	0.4%
Native Hawaiian and Other Pacific Islander	40	0.1%
Some other race	1,717	2.4%
Two or more races	6,741	9.5%
Hispanic or Latino (of any race)	3,576	5.0%

=== 2010 census ===
As of the 2010 census, there were 73,007 people, 29,705 households, and 17,127 families residing in the city. The population density was 2,867.52 inhabitants per square mile (1,107.2/km^{2}). There were 34,571 housing units at an average density of 1,357.86 per square mile (524.3/km^{2}). The racial makeup of the city was 69.11% White, 24.20% African American, 0.48% Native American, 0.35% Asian, 0.05% Pacific Islander, 1.01% from some other races and 4.81% from two or more races. Hispanic or Latino people of any race were 2.60% of the population.

There were 29,705 households, of which 31.5% had children under the age of 18 living with them, 30.8% were married couples living together, 21.1% had a female householder with no husband present, 5.7% had a male householder with no wife present, and 42.3% were non-families. 35.4% of all households were made up of individuals, and 11.6% had someone living alone who was 65 years of age or older. The average household size was 2.35 and the average family size was 3.04.

The median age in the city was 35.6 years. 25.1% of residents were under the age of 18; 10.8% were between the ages of 18 and 24; 25.6% were from 25 to 44; 25.6% were from 45 to 64; and 12.8% were 65 years of age or older. The gender makeup of the city was 47.4% male and 52.6% female.

=== 2000 census ===
As of the 2000 census, there were 80,806 people, 32,489 households, and 19,785 families residing in the city. The population density was 3,933.00 inhabitants per square mile (1,518.5/km^{2}). There were 35,502 housing units at an average density of 1,727.96 per square mile (667.2/km^{2}). The racial makeup of the city was 74.45% White, 21.04% African American, 0.49% Native American, 0.32% Asian, 0.03% Pacific Islander, 0.61% from some other races and 3.06% from two or more races. Hispanic or Latino people of any race were 1.24% of the population.

There were 32,489 households, out of which 30.0% had children under the age of 18 living with them, 37.1% were married couples living together, 19.1% had a female householder with no husband present, and 39.1% were non-families. 33.0% of all households were made up of individuals, and 12.4% had someone living alone who was 65 years of age or older. The average household size was 2.39 and the average family size was 3.04.

In the city the age distribution of the population shows 26.6% under the age of 18, 9.8% from 18 to 24, 29.1% from 25 to 44, 20.2% from 45 to 64, and 14.3% who were 65 years of age or older. The median age was 34 years. For every 100 females, there were 87.5 males. For every 100 females age 18 and over, there were 81.9 males.

The median income for a household in the city was $28,730, and the median income for a family was $35,680. Males had a median income of $30.628 versus $21,581 for females. The per capita income for the city was $15,544. About 15.4% of families and 19.2% of the population were below the poverty line, including 27.4% of those under age 18 and 11.3% of those age 65 or over.

== Economy ==
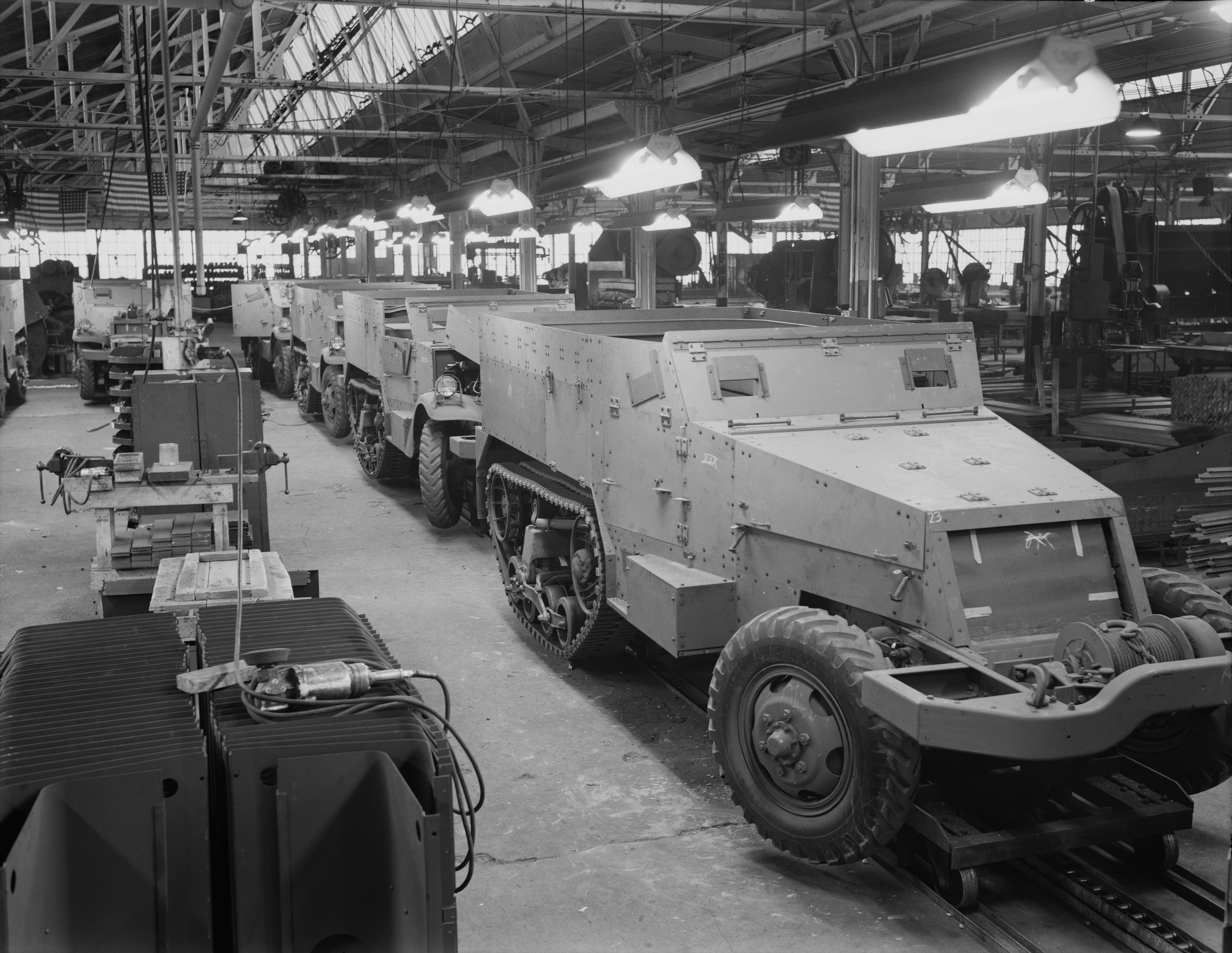
Production of M3 half-track armored cars in a converted Diebold Safe and Lock Company plant, 1941

Canton's economy has traditionally been primarily industrial, with significant healthcare and agricultural segments. The city is home to the TimkenSteel Corporation, a major manufacturer of specialty steel. Several other large companies operate in the greater Canton area, including Timken Company, a maker of tapered roller bearings; Belden Brick Company, a brick and masonry producer; Diebold, a maker of ATMs, electronic voting devices, and bank vaults, and Medline Industries, a manufacturer and distributor of health care supplies. The area is also home to several regional food producers, including Nickles Bakery (baked goods), Case Farms (poultry), and Shearer's Foods (snack foods). Poultry production and dairy farming are also important segments of the Canton area's economy.

Since 2000, Canton has experienced a very low unemployment rate. The healthcare sector is particularly strong, with Aultman Hospital and Mercy Medical Center among its largest employers. Nevertheless, as in many industrial areas of the United States, employment in the manufacturing sector is in a state of decline. LTV Steel (formerly Republic Steel) suffered bankruptcy in 2000. Republic Steel emerged and continues to maintain operations in Canton. Hoover Company, a major employer for decades in the region, reached an agreement to sell Hoover to Hong Kong-based Techtronic Industries. The main plant in nearby North Canton closed its doors in September 2007 due to classified reasons. On June 30, 2014, the Timken Company and TimkenSteel split, forming two separate companies at the urging of shareholders. The Timken Company relocated to neighboring Jackson Township, while TimkenSteel remains headquartered in Canton. In response to this changing manufacturing landscape, the city is undergoing a transition to a retail and service-based economy.

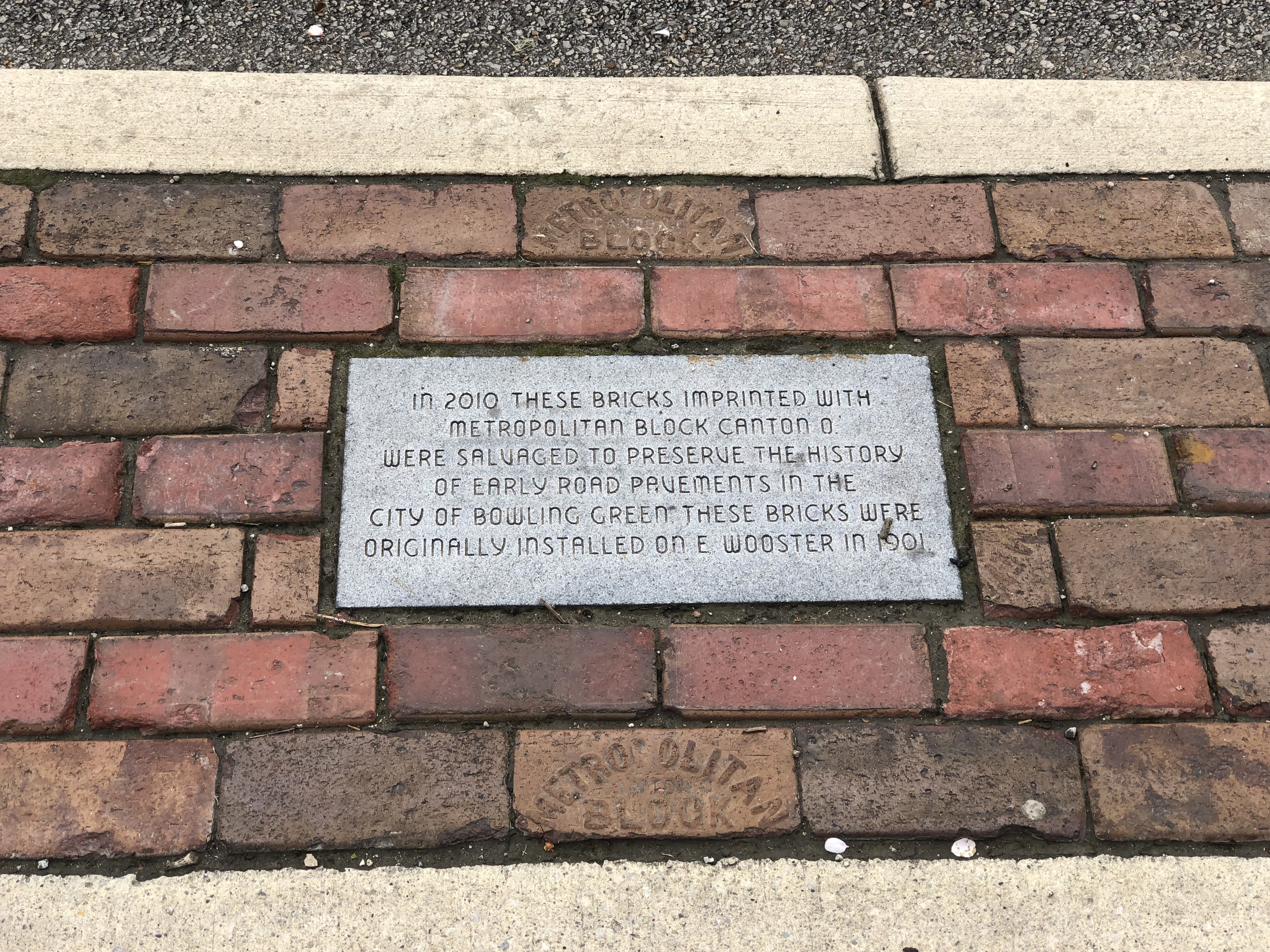
Preserved bricks manufactured in Canton

Beginning in the 1970s, Canton, like many mid-size American cities, lost most of its downtown retail business to the suburbs. The majority of the Canton area's "box store" retail is located in the general vicinity of the Belden Village Mall in Jackson Township. However, the 2010s saw the downtown area bringing in new cafes, restaurants, and the establishment of an arts district. A few retail centers remain in Canton at or near the city limits. Tuscarawas Street (Lincoln Way), a leg of the Lincoln Highway connecting Canton with nearby Massillon, is home to the Canton Centre mall and several retail outlets of varying size. Canton Centre Mall, formerly known as Mellett Mall, was a shopping mall on West Tuscarawas Street in southwest Canton. The mall opened in 1965 and later became known as Canton Centre. By the early 1990s, it remained an active retail and gathering place in the city; a 1993 Los Angeles Times report described its food court while examining Canton's transition from manufacturing employment toward lower-paid service-sector jobs. The property subsequently lost most of its interior tenants and stood largely vacant before demolition work began decades later, the interior of the mall closed in 2020. A vein of commerce runs along Whipple Avenue, connecting the Canton Centre area with the Belden Village area. A similar vein runs north from the downtown area, along Cleveland and Market avenues. Connecting Cleveland and Market avenues is a small shopping district on 30th Street NW, and retail lines the Route 62 corridor leading from Canton to Louisville and Alliance.

The city's economy has diversified due to the decline of the heavy manufacturing industry. At the heart of this transformation is the Pro Football Hall of Fame, with its multimillion-dollar "Hall of Fame Village" expansion project. This project has been complemented with significant investments by city leaders in urban redevelopment, which continued with the transformation of the Hotel Onesto into the Historic Onesto Lofts. Other urban renewal plans are underway, which include the redevelopment of the downtown Market Square area. Private investment has furthered Canton's transformation, which is illustrated by the multimillion-dollar creation of the Gervasi Vineyard, which draws patrons throughout the region. In furtherance of these development initiatives, Canton was one of the first cities in Ohio to create a "designated outdoor refreshment area" legalizing the possession and consumption of "open container" alcoholic beverages in its downtown area.

=== Principal employers ===
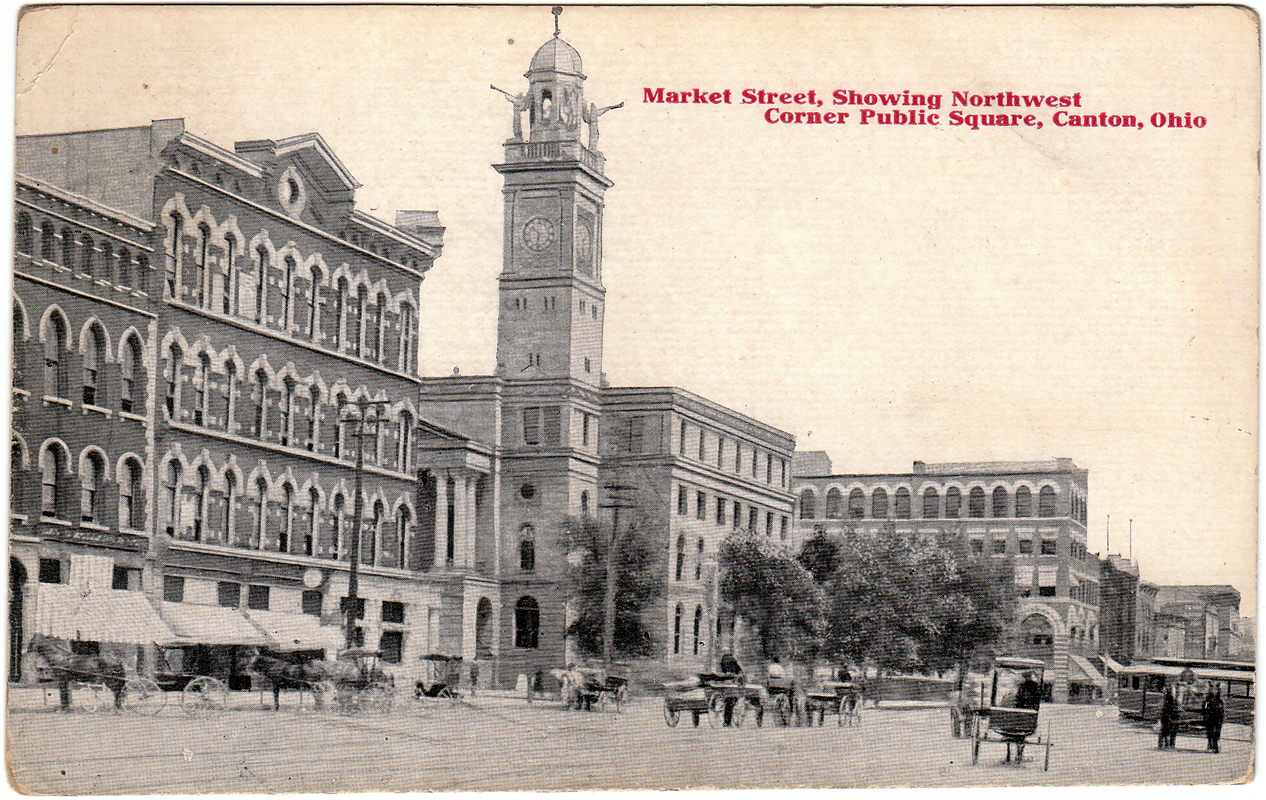
Market Street, showing northwest corner of the public square

According to Canton's 2022 Annual Comprehensive Financial Report, the top employers in the city are:

#	Employer	# of employees	% of city employment
1	Aultman Hospital	4,423	5.9%
2	Cleveland Clinic Mercy	2,420	3.2%
3	Stark County	2,172	2.9%
4	Canton City Schools	2,157	2.9%
5	Walmart	1,736	2.3%
6	Timken Steel	1,613	2.1%
7	Fresh Mark Inc.	1,593	2.1%
8	City of Canton	943	1.3%
9	The M. K. Morse Company	506	0.7%
10	Hendrickson USA	401	0.5%
	Total	17,964	23.8%

== Arts and culture ==
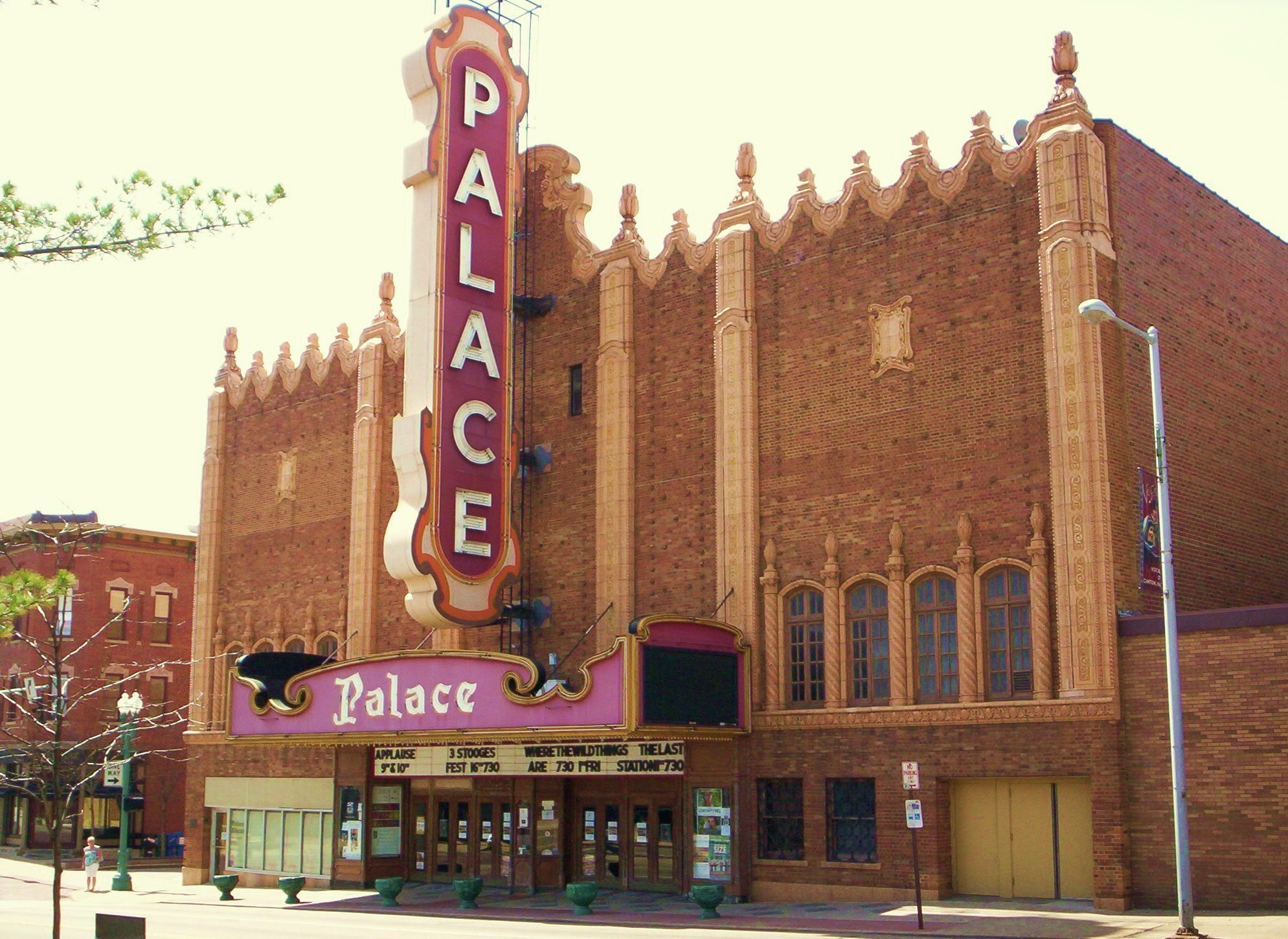
Palace Theatre

The Canton Museum of Art, founded in 1935, is a broad-based community arts organization designed to encourage and promote the fine arts in Canton. The museum focuses on 19th- and 20th-century American artists, specifically works on paper, and on American ceramics, beginning in the 1950s. The museum sponsors annual shows of the work of high school students in Canton and Stark County, and financial scholarships are awarded. Educational outreach programs take the museum off-site to libraries, parochial schools, area public schools, five inner-city schools, and a school for students with behavioral disorders. The city's Arts District, located downtown, is the site of monthly First Friday arts celebrations.

Canton has the main branch of Stark County District Library.

== Sports ==
=== Football ===
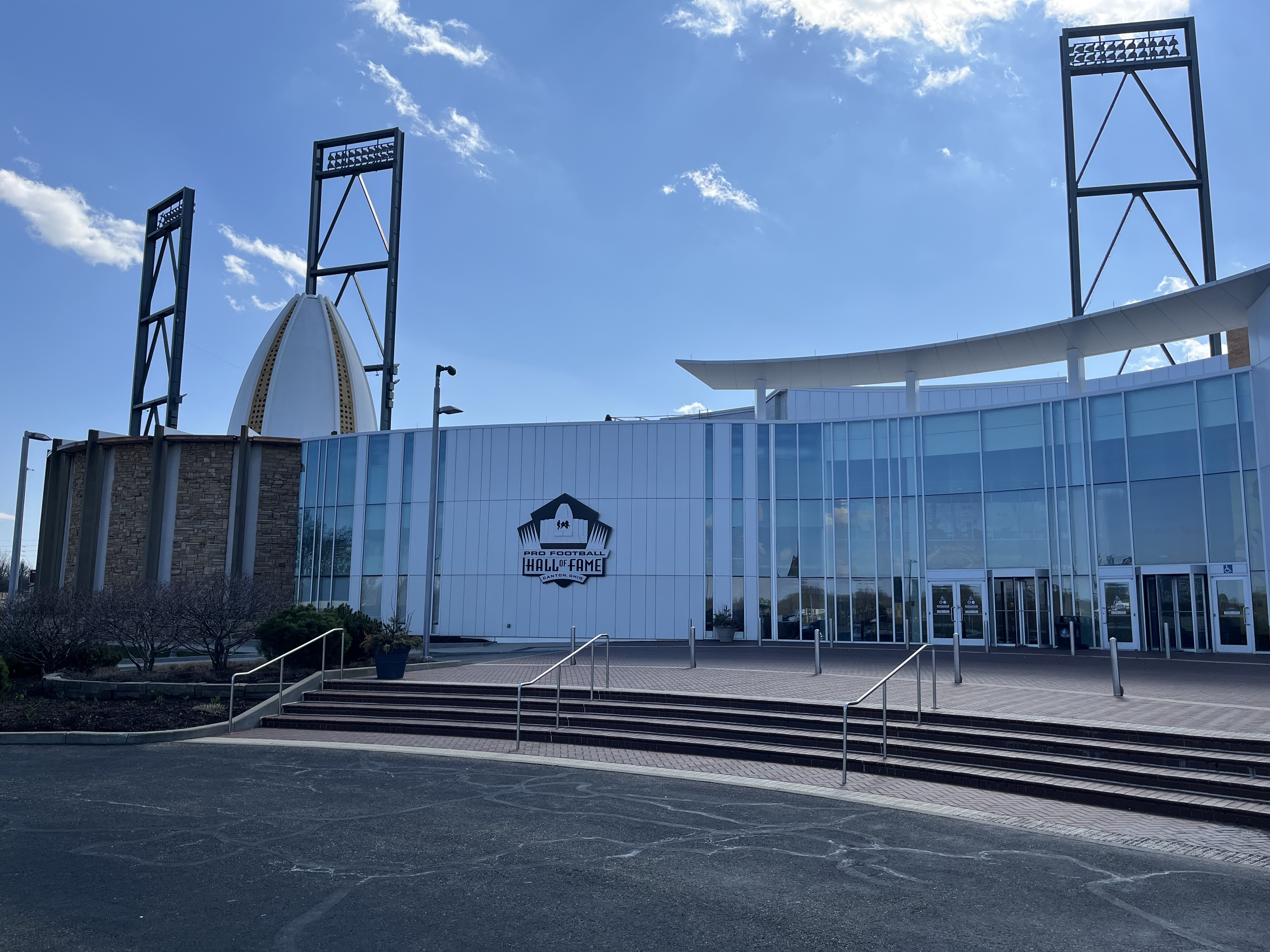
Entrance to the Pro Football Hall of Fame

[[File:Tom Benson Hall of Fame Stadium.png]]
Tom Benson Hall of Fame Stadium is home to the annual Pro Football Hall of Fame Game and in 2023 served as a hub for the USFL.

Canton is home to the Pro Football Hall of Fame. The American Professional Football Association, the forerunner of the modern National Football League, was founded in a Canton car dealership on September 17, 1920. The Canton Bulldogs were an NFL football team that played from 1920 to 1923, skipped the 1924 season, then played from 1925 to 1926 before folding.

Canton is the home of the annual Pro Football Hall of Fame Enshrinement Festival, which includes a hot air balloon festival, ribs burn-off, fashion show, community parade, Sunday morning race, enshrinee dinner, and the Pro Football Hall of Fame Grand Parade. The festival culminates in the enshrinement of the new inductees and the NFL/Hall of Fame Game, a pre-season exhibition between teams representing the AFC and NFC at Tom Benson Hall of Fame Stadium.

Tom Benson Hall of Fame Stadium, used during the regular season by Canton McKinley High School (as well as some other area schools and colleges), was rated the number one high school football venue in America by the Sporting News in 2002. This may be partly attributable to the Bulldogs' rivalry with the nearby Massillon Washington High School Tigers. All seven of the Ohio High School Athletic Association state final football games are hosted in Canton at Tom Benson Hall of Fame Stadium.

The Canton Legends played in the American Indoor Football Association at the Canton Civic Center. Operations were suspended in 2009. The Continental Indoor Football League also has offices in Canton.

For the 2023 United States Football League (USFL) season, Canton served as the hub for the New Jersey Generals and Pittsburgh Maulers, with both teams playing their designated home games at Tom Benson Hall of Fame Stadium.

=== Other ===
The first official female bodybuilding competition was held in Canton in November 1977 and was called the Ohio Regional Women's Physique Championship.

For 10 seasons, Canton was home to an NBA G League team, the Canton Charge, which started play with the 2011–12 season and home games at the Canton Memorial Civic Center. The Cleveland Cavaliers had full control over the franchise and relocated the franchise to Cleveland in 2021 when the ten-year lease ended.

The Canton Invaders of the National Professional Soccer League II and American Indoor Soccer Association played home games at the Canton Memorial Civic Center from 1984 until 1996, winning five league championships. In 2009, the Ohio Vortex became an expansion team in the Professional Arena Soccer League. Operations have since been suspended.

Canton has been home to professional baseball on several occasions. Several minor league teams called Canton home in the early 1900s, including the Canton Terriers in the 1920s and 1930s. The Canton–Akron Indians were the AA affiliate of the major league Cleveland Indians for nine years, playing at Thurman Munson Memorial Stadium until the team relocated north to Akron following the 1996 season. Two independent minor league teams, the Canton Crocodiles and the Canton Coyotes, both members of the Frontier League, called Munson Stadium home for several years afterward. The Crocodiles, who won the league championship in their inaugural season in 1997, moved to Washington, Pennsylvania, in 2002, and the Coyotes moved to Columbia, Missouri, in 2003, after just one season in Canton.

Canton is home to the Bluecoats Drum and Bugle Corps, a world-class competitor in Drum Corps International. The Bluecoats have been a part of the "top five" finalists in the DCI World Championships since 2013, and took home the Founders' Trophy in 2016, 2024, and 2026

== Government ==
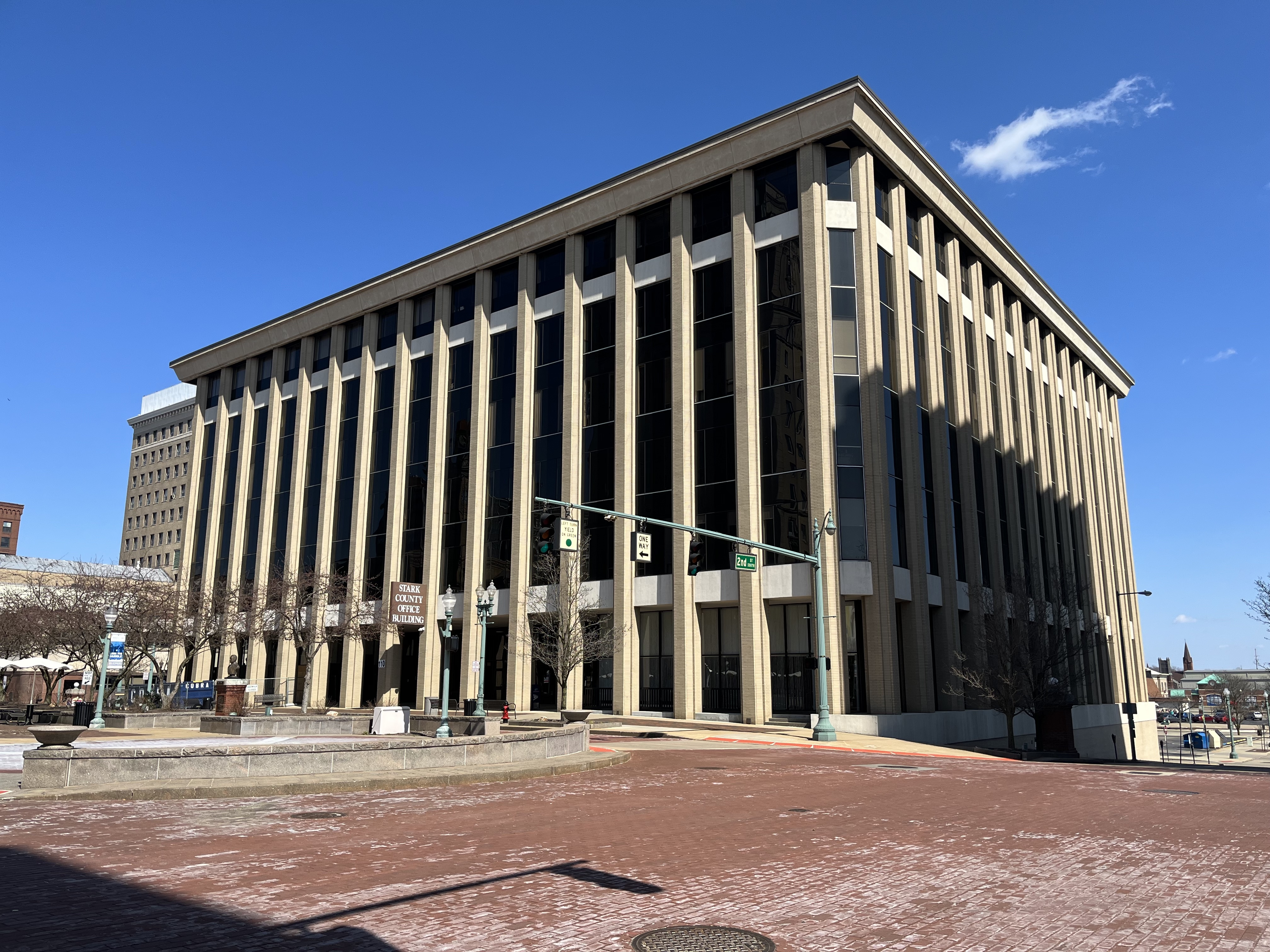
Stark County Office Building

Canton has a mayor–council government and is the largest city in Ohio to operate without a charter. The city council is divided among nine wards with three at-large seats and the council president. In addition, an independently elected mayor serves as an executive. As of 2025, the mayor is William V. Sherer II and the council president is Kristen Bates Aylward.

Canton is included in Ohio's 29th senatorial district, represented by Jane Timken, and the 49th district of the Ohio House of Representatives, represented by Jim Thomas. At the federal level, it has been included in Ohio's 13th congressional district since 2022 and is represented by Emilia Sykes.

=== Law enforcement ===
In April 2024, officers of the Canton Police Department restrained 53-year-old Frank Tyson after a car crash, with Tyson dying after the restraint. Police took down Tyson to the ground, handcuffed him, and then one officer kneeled on Tyson for roughly 30 seconds, with Tyson stating: "I can't breathe. I can't breathe. You're on my neck". After the knee was removed and Tyson was left on his stomach, Tyson became motionless and subsequently died. Two Canton officers were assigned paid administrative leave during an investigation into the incident.

In May 2024, Canton Police officers arrested a male bystander during a traffic stop after Patrolman Nicholas Casto accused him of taunting his police dog. Body camera footage showed several officers bringing the bystander to the ground, and Casto leading the dog to bite his arm for 15 seconds, despite the bystander keeping his arms still. After the dog was removed, Casto praised it. Casto was placed on paid administrative leave, prompting concern from Canton councilmen. In early June, Police Chief John Gabbard recommended Casto's dismissal for false statements in his report that justified excessive force. Director Andrea Perry, supported by Mayor William Sherer, fired Casto in late June, concluding the bystander posed no threat and Casto's actions endangered officers. Perry confirmed Casto knowingly provided inaccurate information.

== Education ==
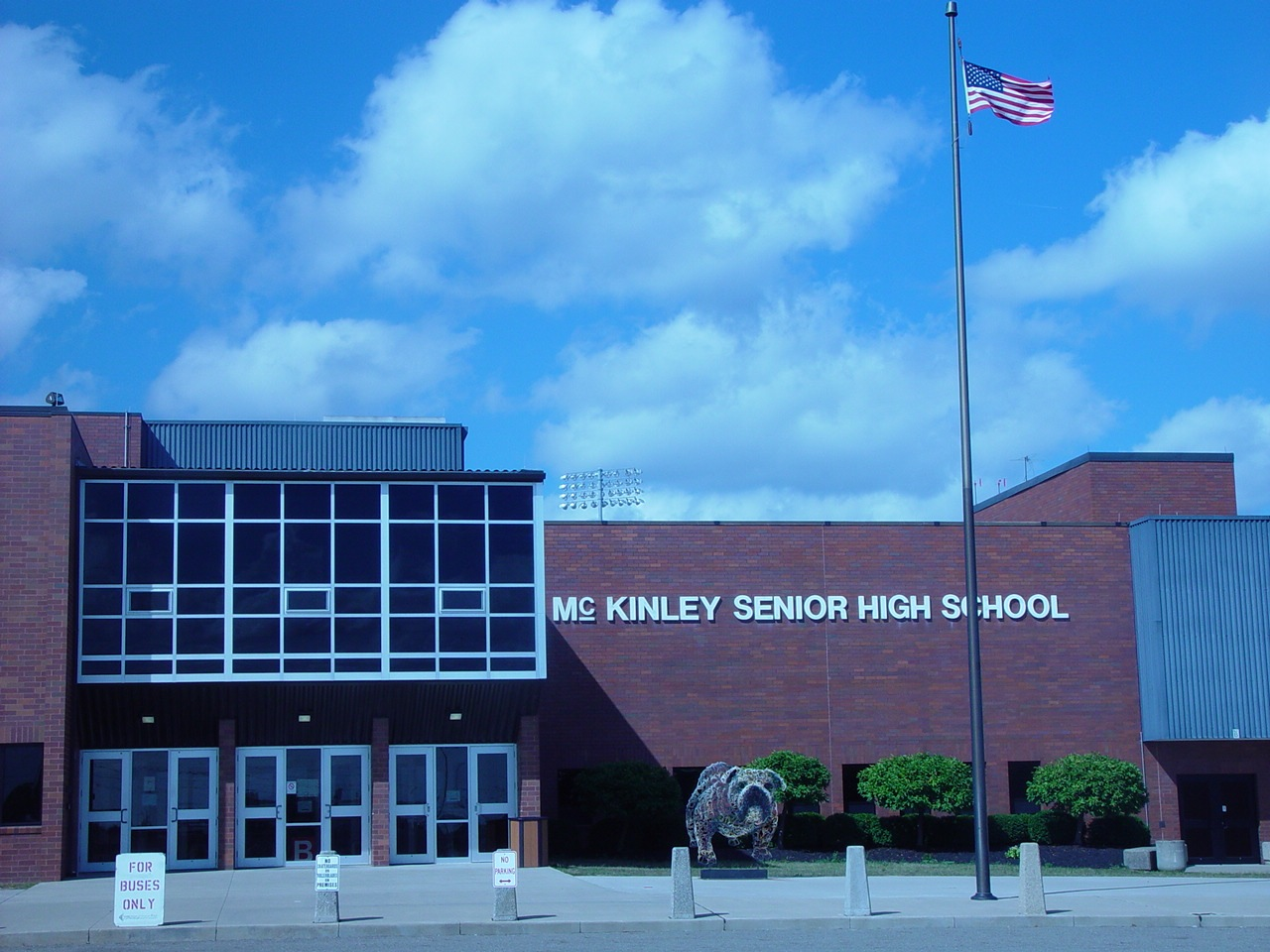
Canton McKinley High School is the largest secondary school in Canton.

Canton's K–12 students are primarily served by the public Canton City School District, which included eight elementary schools, three middle schools, and two high schools, in addition to alternative education centers. A portion of northern Canton is included in the Plain Local School District, and another overlap exists with the suburban Canton Local School District.

Catholic grade schools within Canton are St. Peter, St. Joseph, and Our Lady of Peace. Additional Catholic schools in the immediate area include St. Michael the Archangel School (PK–8) and Central Catholic High School (9–12). There is also Heritage Christian School (K–12), a Christian grade school and high school. Canton Country Day School is a private PreK–8 school located just outside city limits founded as part of the Country Day School movement. Within the city limits is the private Canton Montessori School, which teaches according to the Montessori Plan for Education proposed by Maria Montessori in the early 20th century.

Malone University, a private, four-year liberal arts college affiliated with the Evangelical Friends Church - Eastern Region, is located on 25th Street NW. Catholic-run Walsh University is located nearby in North Canton. Stark State College and a branch of Kent State University are also nearby in Jackson Township. Also in downtown Canton, there is a small annex for Stark State College to be used by the early college high school students who are located on the Timken Campus.

== Media ==
=== Print ===
Canton is served in print and to a digital audience by The Repository, the city's only newspaper.

=== TV ===
Canton is part of the Cleveland/Akron/Canton television media market. Four stations are licensed to Canton – full-power WDLI (Bounce) and WRLM (TCT), and low-power WOHZ-CD (RESN) and WIVM-LD (Independent). The two full-power stations identify as Canton/Akron/Cleveland, serving the entire market, while the two low-power stations specifically serve Canton.

Canton also has a cable Public-access television channel, Canton City Schools TV 11. The content varies based on the viewer's location. Citizens located in North Canton will see North Canton's programming instead of Canton City's. Those within the borders of Plain Local Schools will see Eagle Television's programming.

=== Radio ===
Though part of the Cleveland TV market, Canton has its own radio market, served by stations such as WKRW 89.3 (NPR – WKSU simulcast), WDJQ 92.5 (Contemporary hits), WHBC-FM 94.1 (Hot AC), WHOF 101.7 (Classic hits), WRQK 106.9 (Rock), WTIG 990 (Sports), WILB 1060 (Catholic), WDPN 1310 (Soft AC), WHBC 1480 (News/Talk), and WINW 1520.

== Transportation ==
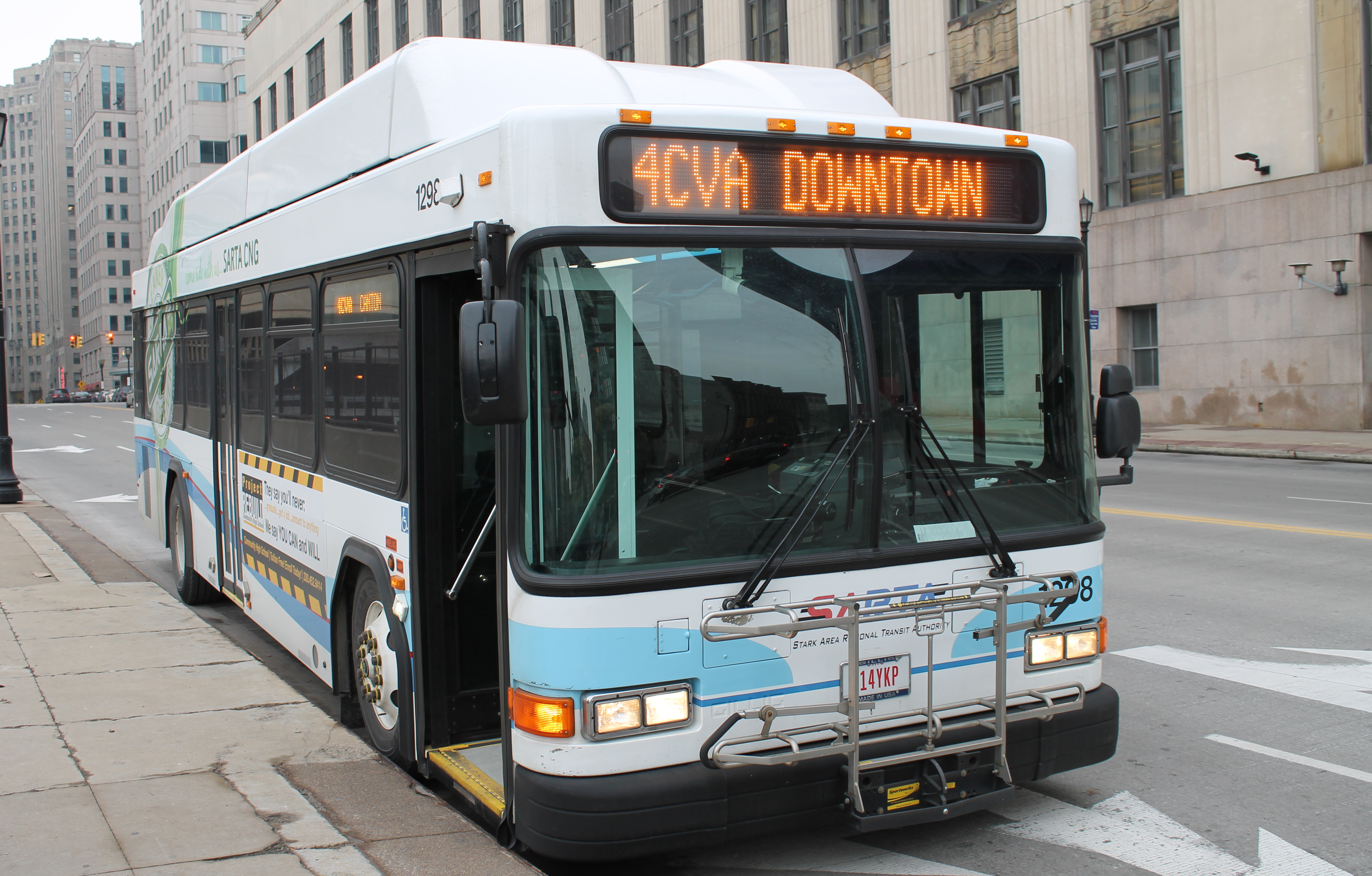
A SARTA bus in 2013

Canton is connected to the Interstate Highway System via Interstate 77, which connects Canton to Marietta to the south and Cleveland to the north. U.S. Route 30 connects Canton to Wooster westward and East Liverpool eastward. U.S. Route 62 connects Canton to Millersburg to the southwest and to Youngstown to the northeast.

The city has several arterial roads, including Ohio 43 (Market Avenue, Walnut Avenue and Cherry Avenue), Ohio 153 (12th Street and Mahoning Road), Ohio 172 (Tuscarawas Street) / The Lincoln Highway, Ohio 297 (Whipple Avenue and Raff Avenue), Ohio 627 (Faircrest Street), Ohio 687 (Fulton Drive), and Ohio 800 (Cleveland Avenue) / A.K.A. Old Route 8.

Until 1990, Amtrak's passenger trains Broadway Limited and the Capitol Limited made stops at Canton station. Amtrak's Capitol Limited currently makes stops in Alliance station, 20 miles (32 km) to the northeast. Norfolk Southern and the Wheeling and Lake Erie railroads provide freight service in Canton.

Stark Area Regional Transit Authority (SARTA) provides public transit bus service within the county, including service to Massillon and the Akron-Canton Regional Airport. In February 2022, it was reported that SARTA had hired a consultant group to study the feasibility of a light rail line from the Pro Football Hall of Fame to downtown Canton, with possible expansion to other locations around the county in the future. In June of that same year, the full plan was released, calling for a nine-mile line from Akron-Canton Airport to downtown, where it would run down 3rd street in a separated lane from traffic. It would connect to existing bus services near Belden Village Mall and Cornerstone Transit Center. A first round of public meetings was held.

== Sister cities ==
Canton has two sister cities:

- – Acre, Israel
- – Saltillo, Coahuila, Mexico
