= Stark State College =

Public college in Stark County, Ohio, US

- Former names: Stark State College of Technology; Stark County Technical Institute; Stark State Technical Institute; Stark Technical College
- Type: Public community college
- Established: 1960; 66 years ago
- Parent institution: University System of Ohio
- President: Para Jones
- Students: 10,390
- Location: North Canton, Ohio, United States; 40.8708°N 81.4400°W
- Colors: Red and blue
- Nickname: Spartans
- Website: starkstate.edu

Stark State College (Stark State) is a public community college near North Canton, Ohio, United States. The college offers 230 majors, options, one-year certificates, and career enhancement certificates. As of fall 2025, the enrollment was 10,390. Approximately 4,000 noncredit students are enrolled in continuing education and contract training activities.

== History ==
Clayton G. Horn, Samuel Krugliak, and Ralph Regula were the leading figures in the founding of Stark State College in 1960. The founding President was Fred A Yenny. The college originally was named Stark County Technical Institute and over the years, renamed Stark State Technical Institute and Stark Technical College. In 1996, the college was renamed Stark State College of Technology and, most recently, renamed as Stark State College.

The college introduced its first new logo in 57 years on January 17, 2017. Stark State called the new logo, "a contemporary image intended to resonate with prospective students, now and into the future."

== Locations ==
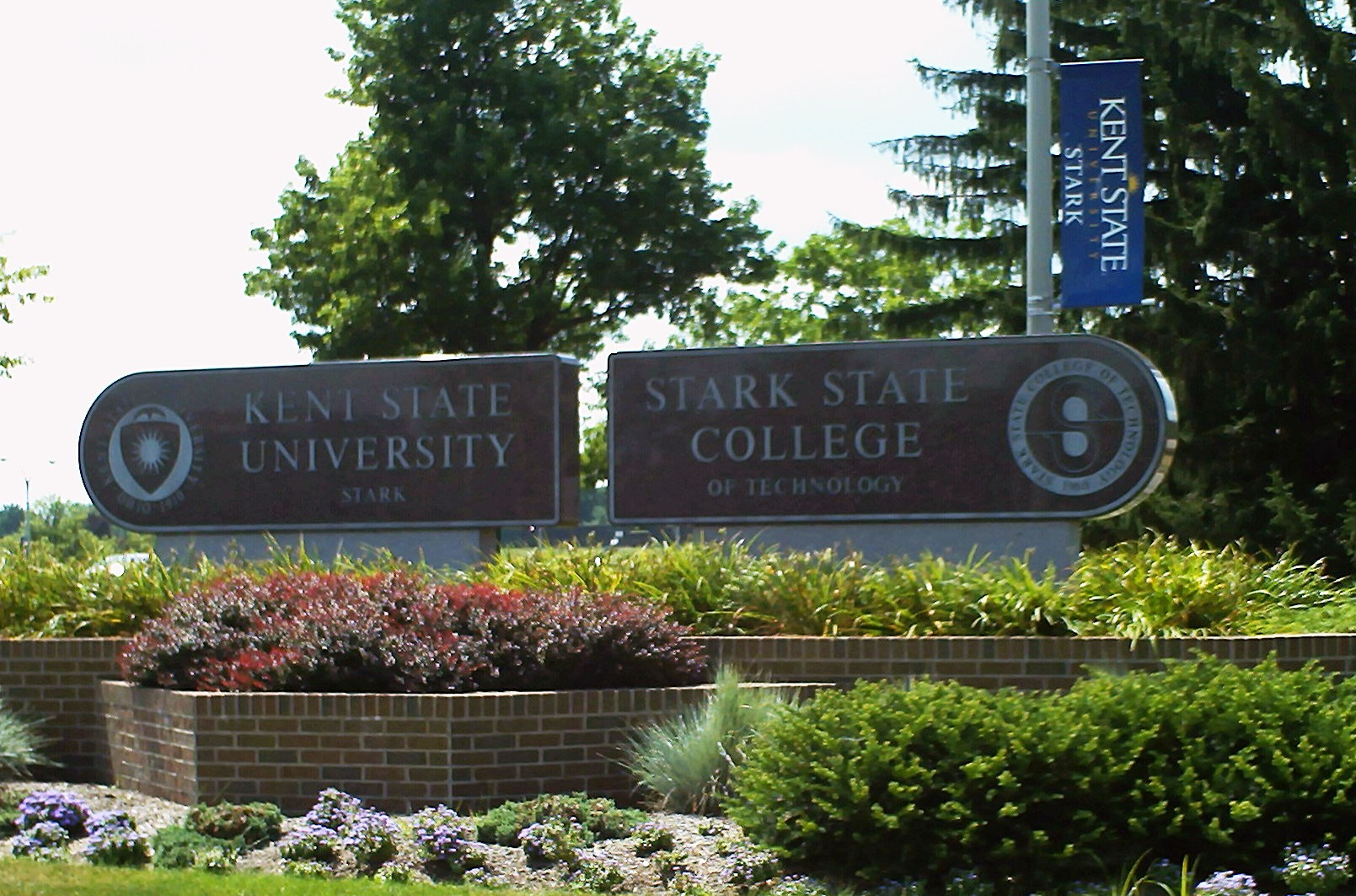
Kent State University Stark / Stark State entry from Frank Avenue

The main campus of Stark State is located on 200 acres (81 ha) in Jackson Township near North Canton, Ohio, adjacent to the campus of Kent State University at Stark. Stark State also owns 42 acres (17 ha) on the corner of Frank and Mega roads, used primarily for parking. Recently the college expanded the campus by six buildings and 200,000 sq ft (19,000 m^{2}). Stark State also offers classes at satellite campuses in Akron, Barberton, and downtown Canton. From 2015 to 2021, the college also operated a satellite center in Alliance.

=== Stark State College Akron ===
Stark State College Akron was established in 2017 when SSC began offering classes at a leased facility at 755 White Pond Drive in Akron. A new $15.7 million, 68,000-square-foot (6,300 m^{2}) facility opened along Perkins Street adjacent to State Route 8 in 2018, with an additional phase on the third floor completed in mid-2019. The facility, close to the main campus of the University of Akron (UA), enrolls approximately 1,800 students as of 2019. Stark State and UA established the "Direct Connect" dual admission partnership in October 2018 which allows students to enroll at Stark State to complete an associate degree with the intention of transferring to UA to complete a bachelor's degree.

== Accreditation ==
Stark State College is accredited by the Higher Learning Commission. In addition, a number of its specific programs are separately accredited by organizations in their respective fields.
