= Ohio's 29th senatorial district =

American legislative district

Ohio's 29th State Senate district
Senator
| Jane Timken; R–North Canton |
- Demographics: 82.2% White; 10.7% Black; 2.9% Hispanic; 1.4% Asian; 2.4% Native American; 0.1% Hawaiian/Pacific Islander
- Population (2020) • Voting age • Citizens of voting age: 354,275; 278,490; 272,883

Ohio's 29th senatorial district has historically been based in Canton, Ohio, and now consists of the majority of Stark County, except for the southwest corner. It encompasses Ohio House districts 48, 49 and 50. It has a Cook PVI of R+10.

The current Ohio Senator is Republican Jane Timken, who was appointed to the seat in January 2025, and was reelected for another term in November 2026.

== 2026 Election Results ==
Jane Timpkin (R) 74,864 55.1%

Thomas West (D) 61,071 44.9%

== List of senators ==
| Senator | Party | Term | Notes |
|---|---|---|---|
| Ralph Regula | Republican | January 3, 1967 – January 3, 1973 | Regula resigned in 1973 after winning election to the United States Congress. |
| Richard Reichel | Republican | January 3, 1973 – December 31, 1974 | Reichel lost re-election in 1974 to Robert D. Freeman. |
| Robert D. Freeman | Democratic | January 3, 1975 – December 31, 1978 | Freeman lost re-election in 1978 to Tom Walsh. |
| Tom Walsh | Republican | January 1, 1979 – February 5, 1985 | Walsh resigned in 1985 prior to the expiration of his term. |
| Scott Oelslager | Republican | February 5, 1985 – December 31, 2002 | Oelslager was term-limited in 2002. |
| Kirk Schuring | Republican | January 6, 2003 – December 31, 2010 | Schuring was term-limited in 2010. |
| Scott Oelslager | Republican | January 3, 2011 – December 31, 2018 | Oelslager was term-limited in 2018. |
| Kirk Schuring | Republican | January 3, 2019 – November 22, 2024 | Schuring died in office. |
| Jane Timken | Republican | January 29, 2025 – present | Incumbent |
