= Ohio's 16th congressional district =

U.S. House district for Ohio

Coordinates: 40°58′56″N 81°44′26″W

- Obsolete district
- Created: 1830
- Eliminated: 2020
- Years active: 1833–2023

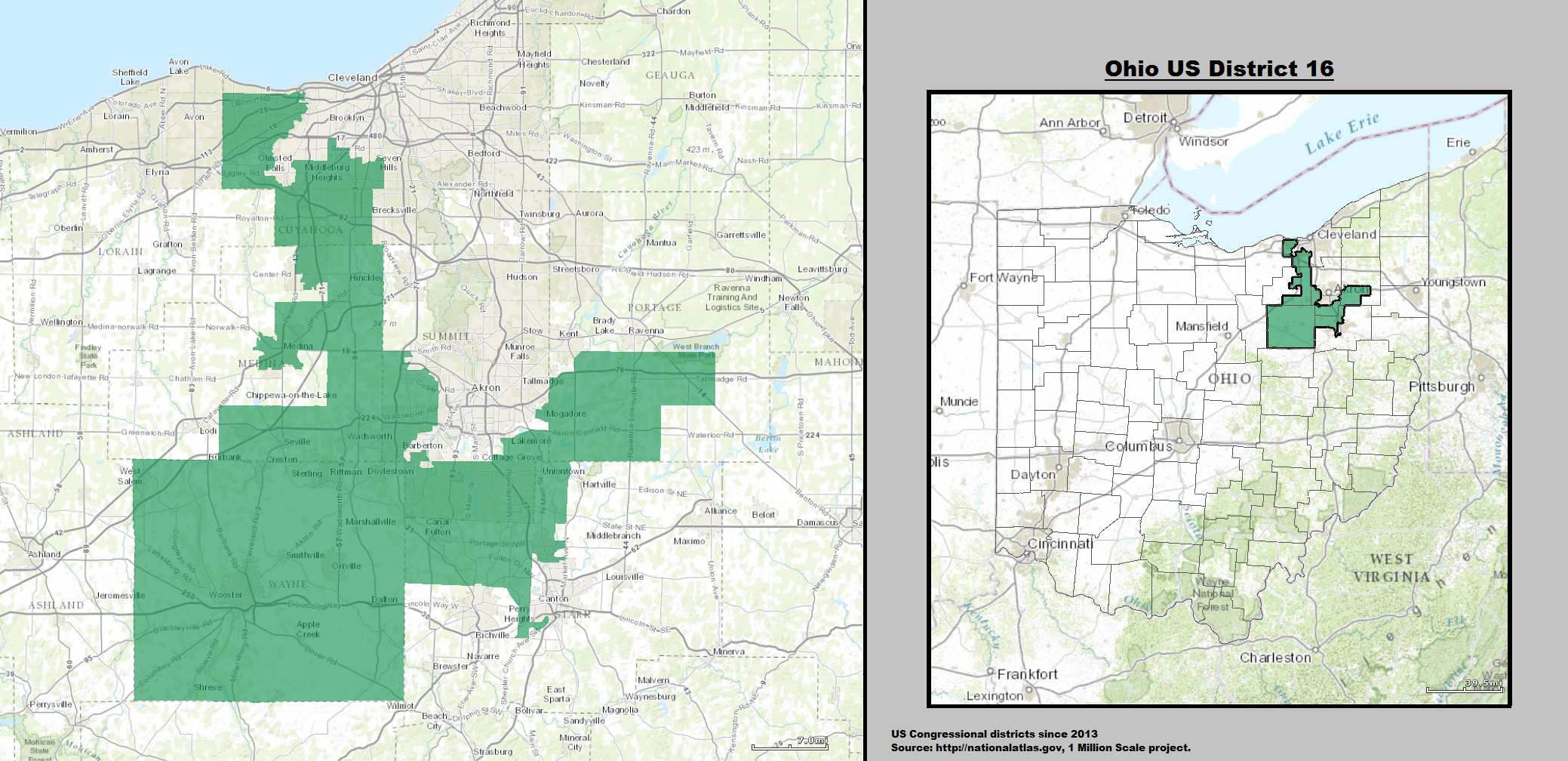
The district from 2013 to 2023

The 16th congressional district of Ohio is an obsolete United States congressional district last represented by Representative Anthony Gonzalez (R). It was last located in the northeast of the state, covering Wayne County and with arms extending north into the suburbs of Cleveland, and east into Greater Akron and Stark County. The district was eliminated upon the swearing in of the 118th United States Congress on January 3, 2023, as the reapportionment after the 2020 census reduced the number of congressional districts in Ohio to fifteen.

== History ==
From 2003 to 2013, the district was based in Stark County and the Canton area, and also included Wayne County and most of Medina and Ashland counties. It also includes some rural communities east of Akron, as well as some of the western suburbs of Cleveland.

On November 2, 2010, Democrat John Boccieri lost his bid for a second term to Republican Jim Renacci, who was seated in January 2011. In January 2018, Renacci announced his candidacy for the U.S. Senate. Anthony Gonzalez was elected on November 6 to succeed him.

== Election results from statewide races ==
Year	Office	Results
2008	President	McCain 51% - 47%
2012	President	Romney 53% - 45%
2012	Senate	Mandel 48% - 46%
2016	President	Trump 56% - 39%
2016	Senate	Portman 63% - 32%
2018	Senate	Renacci 50.4% - 49.6%
2018	Governor	DeWine 54% - 43%
2018	Secretary of State	LaRose 54% - 44%
2018	Treasurer	Sprague 57% - 43%
2018	Auditor	Faber 53% - 43%
2018	Attorney General	Yost 54% - 46%
2020	President	Trump 56% - 42%

== List of members representing the district ==
Member	Party	Year(s)	Cong ress	Electoral history
District established March 4, 1833
Elisha Whittlesey (Canfield)	Anti-Masonic	March 4, 1833 – March 3, 1835	23rd 24th 25th	Redistricted from the 13th district. Re-elected in 1832. Re-elected in 1834. Re-elected in 1836. Resigned.
Elisha Whittlesey (Canfield)	Whig	March 4, 1835 – July 9, 1838	23rd 24th 25th	Redistricted from the 13th district. Re-elected in 1832. Re-elected in 1834. Re-elected in 1836. Resigned.
Vacant		July 9, 1838 – December 3, 1838	25th	
Joshua Reed Giddings (Jefferson)	Whig	December 3, 1838 – March 22, 1842	25th 26th 27th	Elected to finish Whittlesey's term. Re-elected in 1838. Re-elected in 1840. Resigned.
Vacant		March 22, 1842 – December 5, 1842	27th	
Joshua Reed Giddings (Jefferson)	Whig	December 5, 1842 – March 3, 1843	27th	Elected to finish his own term. Redistricted to the 20th district.
James Mathews (Coshocton)	Democratic	March 4, 1843 – March 3, 1845	28th	Redistricted from the 13th district and re-elected in 1843. [data missing]
John D. Cummins (New Philadelphia)	Democratic	March 4, 1845 – March 3, 1849	29th 30th	Elected in 1844. Re-elected in 1846. [data missing]
Moses Hoagland (Millersburg)	Democratic	March 4, 1849 – March 3, 1851	31st	Elected in 1848. [data missing]
John Johnson (Coshocton)	Independent Democratic	March 4, 1851 – March 3, 1853	32nd	Elected in 1850. [data missing]
Edward Ball (Zanesville)	Whig	March 4, 1853 – March 3, 1855	33rd 34th	Elected in 1852. Re-elected in 1854. [data missing]
Edward Ball (Zanesville)	Anti-Nebraska	March 4, 1855 – March 3, 1857	33rd 34th	Elected in 1852. Re-elected in 1854. [data missing]
Cydnor B. Tompkins (McConnellsville)	Republican	March 4, 1857 – March 3, 1861	35th 36th	Elected in 1856. Re-elected in 1858. [data missing]
William P. Cutler (Constitution)	Republican	March 4, 1861 – March 3, 1863	37th	Elected in 1860. [data missing]
Joseph W. White (Cambridge)	Democratic	March 4, 1863 – March 3, 1865	38th	Elected in 1862. [data missing]
John Bingham (Cadiz)	Republican	March 4, 1865 – March 3, 1873	39th 40th 41st 42nd	Elected in 1864. Re-elected in 1866. Re-elected in 1868. Re-elected in 1870. [data missing]
Lorenzo Danford (St. Clairsville)	Republican	March 4, 1873 – March 3, 1879	43rd 44th 45th	Elected in 1872. Re-elected in 1874. Re-elected in 1876. [data missing]
William McKinley (Canton)	Republican	March 4, 1879 – March 3, 1881	46th	Redistricted from the 17th district and re-elected in 1878. Redistricted to the 17th district.
Jonathan T. Updegraff (Mount Pleasant)	Republican	March 4, 1881 – November 30, 1882	47th	Redistricted from the 18th district and re-elected in 1880. Died.
Vacant		November 30, 1882 – January 2, 1883	47th	
Joseph D. Taylor (Cambridge)	Republican	January 2, 1883 – March 3, 1883	47th	Elected to finish Updegraff's term. Redistricted to the 17th district.
Beriah Wilkins (Uhrichsville)	Democratic	March 4, 1883 – March 3, 1885	48th	Elected in 1882. Redistricted to the 15th district.
George W. Geddes (Mansfield)	Democratic	March 4, 1885 – March 3, 1887	49th	Redistricted from the 14th district and re-elected in 1884. [data missing]
Beriah Wilkins (Uhrichsville)	Democratic	March 4, 1887 – March 3, 1889	50th	Redistricted from the 15th district and re-elected in 1886. [data missing]
James W. Owens (Newark)	Democratic	March 4, 1889 – March 3, 1891	51st	Elected in 1888. Redistricted to the 14th district.
John G. Warwick (Massillon)	Democratic	March 4, 1891 – August 14, 1892	52nd	Elected in 1890. Died.
Vacant		August 14, 1892 – December 5, 1892	52nd	
Lewis P. Ohliger (Wooster)	Democratic	December 5, 1892 – March 3, 1893	52nd	Elected to finish Warwick's term. [data missing]
Albert J. Pearson (Woodsfield)	Democratic	March 4, 1893 – March 3, 1895	53rd	Redistricted from the 17th district and re-elected in 1892. [data missing]
Lorenzo Danford (St. Clairsville)	Republican	March 4, 1895 – June 19, 1899	54th 55th 56th	Elected in 1894. Re-elected in 1896. Re-elected in 1898. Died.
Vacant		June 19, 1899 – December 4, 1899	56th	
Joseph J. Gill (Steubenville)	Republican	December 4, 1899 – October 31, 1903	56th 57th 58th	Elected to finish Danford's term. Re-elected in 1900. Re-elected in 1902. Resigned.
Vacant		October 31, 1903 – November 3, 1903	58th	
Capell L. Weems (St. Clairsville)	Republican	November 3, 1903 – March 3, 1909	58th 59th 60th	Elected to finish Gill's term. Re-elected in 1904. Re-elected in 1906. [data missing]
David Hollingsworth (Cadiz)	Republican	March 4, 1909 – March 3, 1911	61st	Elected in 1908. [data missing]
William B. Francis (Martins Ferry)	Democratic	March 4, 1911 – March 3, 1915	62nd 63rd	Elected in 1910. Re-elected in 1912. [data missing]
Roscoe C. McCulloch (Canton)	Republican	March 4, 1915 – March 3, 1921	64th 65th 66th	Elected in 1914. Re-elected in 1916. Re-elected in 1918. Retired to run for Governor of Ohio.
Joseph H. Himes (Canton)	Republican	March 4, 1921 – March 3, 1923	67th	Elected in 1920. Lost re-election.
John McSweeney (Wooster)	Democratic	March 4, 1923 – March 3, 1929	68th 69th 70th	Elected in 1922. Re-elected in 1924. Re-elected in 1926. Lost re-election.
Charles B. McClintock (Canton)	Republican	March 4, 1929 – March 3, 1933	71st 72nd	Elected in 1928. Re-elected in 1930. Lost re-election.
William R. Thom (Canton)	Democratic	March 4, 1933 – January 3, 1939	73rd 74th 75th	Elected in 1932. Re-elected in 1934. Re-elected in 1936. Lost re-election.
James Seccombe (Canton)	Republican	January 3, 1939 – January 3, 1941	76th	Elected in 1938. Lost re-election.
William R. Thom (Canton)	Democratic	January 3, 1941 – January 3, 1943	77th	Elected in 1940. Lost re-election.
Henderson H. Carson (Canton)	Republican	January 3, 1943 – January 3, 1945	78th	Elected in 1942. Lost re-election.
William R. Thom (Canton)	Democratic	January 3, 1945 – January 3, 1947	79th	Elected in 1944. Lost re-election.
Henderson H. Carson (Canton)	Republican	January 3, 1947 – January 3, 1949	80th	Elected in 1946. Lost re-election.
John McSweeney (Wooster)	Democratic	January 3, 1949 – January 3, 1951	81st	Elected in 1948. Lost re-election.
Frank T. Bow (Canton)	Republican	January 3, 1951 – November 13, 1972	82nd 83rd 84th 85th 86th 87th 88th 89th 90th 91st 92nd	Elected in 1950. Re-elected in 1952. Re-elected in 1954. Re-elected in 1956. Re-elected in 1958. Re-elected in 1960. Re-elected in 1962. Re-elected in 1964. Re-elected in 1966. Re-elected in 1968. Re-elected in 1970. Retired but died.
Vacant		November 13, 1972 – January 3, 1973	92nd	
Ralph Regula (Navarre)	Republican	January 3, 1973 – January 3, 2009	93rd 94th 95th 96th 97th 98th 99th 100th 101st 102nd 103rd 104th 105th 106th 107th 108th 109th 110th	Elected in 1972. Re-elected in 1974. Re-elected in 1976. Re-elected in 1978. Re-elected in 1980. Re-elected in 1982. Re-elected in 1984. Re-elected in 1986. Re-elected in 1988. Re-elected in 1990. Re-elected in 1992. Re-elected in 1994. Re-elected in 1996. Re-elected in 1998. Re-elected in 2000. re-elected in 2002. Re-elected in 2004. Re-elected in 2006. Retired.
John Boccieri (Alliance)	Democratic	January 3, 2009 – January 3, 2011	111th	Elected in 2008. Lost re-election.
Jim Renacci (Wadsworth)	Republican	January 3, 2011 – January 3, 2019	112th 113th 114th 115th	Elected in 2010. Re-elected in 2012. Re-elected in 2014. Re-elected in 2016. Retired to run for U.S. Senator.
Anthony Gonzalez (Rocky River)	Republican	January 3, 2019 – January 3, 2023	116th 117th	Elected in 2018. Re-elected in 2020. Redistricted to the 7th district and retired at the end of his term.
District dissolved January 3, 2023

== Election results ==
=== 2010 ===
2010 United States House of Representatives elections in Ohio
Party	Candidate	Votes	%
**Republican**	**Jim Renacci**	**112,902**	**52.1**
Democratic	John Boccieri (incumbent)	89,008	41.1
Libertarian	Jeffery Blevins	14,342	6.6
Independent	Robert Ross	128	0
Total votes		**216,380**	
Turnout			
Republican **gain** from Democratic			

=== 2012 ===
2012 United States House of Representatives elections in Ohio
Party	Candidate	Votes	%
**Republican**	**Jim Renacci (incumbent)**	**185,165**	**52.0**
Democratic	Betty Sutton (incumbent)	170,600	48.0
Total votes		**355,765**	**100.0**
Republican **hold**			

=== 2014 ===
2014 United States House of Representatives elections in Ohio
Party	Candidate	Votes	%
**Republican**	**Jim Renacci (incumbent)**	**132,176**	**63.7**
Democratic	Pete Crossland	75,199	36.3
Total votes		**207,375**	**100.0**
Republican **hold**			

=== 2016 ===
2016 United States House of Representatives elections in Ohio
Party	Candidate	Votes	%
**Republican**	**Jim Renacci (incumbent)**	**225,794**	**65.3**
Democratic	Keith Mundy	119,830	34.7
Total votes		**345,624**	**100.0**
Republican **hold**			

=== 2018 ===
2018 United States House of Representatives elections in Ohio
Party	Candidate	Votes	%
**Republican**	**Anthony Gonzalez**	**170,029**	**56.7**
Democratic	Susan Moran Palmer	129,681	43.3
Total votes		**299,710**	**100.0**
Republican **hold**			

=== 2020 ===
2020 United States House of Representatives elections in Ohio
Party	Candidate	Votes	%
**Republican**	**Anthony Gonzalez (incumbent)**	**247,335**	**63.2**
Democratic	Aaron Paul Godfrey	144,071	36.8
Total votes		**391,406**	**100.0**
Republican **hold**			

The following chart shows historic election results. Bold type indicates victor. Italic type indicates incumbent.

Year	Democratic	Republican	Other
2020	Aaron Paul Godfrey: 144,071	Anthony Gonzalez: 247,335	
2018	Susan Moran Palmer: 129,681	Anthony Gonzalez: 170,029	
2016	Keith Mundy: 119,830	**James B. Renacci**: 225,794	
2014	Pete Crossland: 75,199	**James B. Renacci**: 132,176	
2012	Betty S. Sutton: 170,604	**James B. Renacci**: 185,167	
2010	John Boccieri: 89,008	James B. Renacci: 112,902	Jeffery Blevins (L):14,342; Robert Ross(I): 128
2008	John Boccieri: 169,044	Kirk Schuring: 136,293	
2006	Thomas Shaw: 88,089	**Ralph S. Regula**: 124,886	
2004	Jeff Seemann: 99,210	**Ralph S. Regula**: 197,990	
2002	Jim Rice: 58,644	**Ralph S. Regula**: 129,734	
2000	William Smith: 62,709	**Ralph S. Regula**: 162,294	Richard L. Shetler (L): 6,166; Brad Graef (N): 3,231
1998	Peter D. Ferguson: 66,047	**Ralph S. Regula**: 117,426	
1996	Thomas E. Burkhart: 64,902	**Ralph S. Regula**: 159,314	Brad Graef (N): 7,611
1994	J. Michael Finn: 45,781	**Ralph S. Regula**: 137,322	
1992	Warner D. Mendenhall: 90,224	**Ralph S. Regula**: 158,489	
1990	Warner D. Mendenhall: 70,516	**Ralph S. Regula**: 101,097	
1988	Melvin J. Gravely: 43,356	**Ralph S. Regula**: 158,824	
1986	William J. Kennick: 36,639	**Ralph S. Regula**: 118,206	
1984	James Gwin: 58,048	**Ralph S. Regula**: 152,399	
1982	Jeffrey R. Orenstein: 57,386	**Ralph S. Regula**: 110,485	
1980	Larry V. Slagle: 39,219	**Ralph S. Regula**: 149,960	
1978	Owen S. Hand Jr.: 29,640	**Ralph S. Regula**: 105,152	
1976	John G. Freedom: 55,671	**Ralph S. Regula**: 116,374	Harold B. Festerly (A): 1,969; Mark F. Vanvoorhis (W): 77
1974	John G. Freedom: 48,754	**Ralph S. Regula**: 92,986	
1972	Virgil L. Musser: 75,929	Ralph S. Regula: 102,013	
1970	Virgil L. Musser: 63,187	**Frank T. Bow**: 81,208	
1968	Virgil L. Musser: 68,916	**Frank T. Bow**: 101,495	
1966	Robert D. Freeman: 55,775	**Frank T. Bow**: 87,597	
1964	Robert D. Freeman: 93,255	**Frank T. Bow**: 101,808	
1962	Ed Witmer: 64,213	**Frank T. Bow**: 96,512	
1960	John G. Freedom: 78,257	**Frank T. Bow**: 130,542	
1958	John G. Freedom: 74,660	**Frank T. Bow**: 100,678	
1956	John McSweeney: 82,206	**Frank T. Bow**: 101,324	
1954	Thomas H. Nichols: 56,787	**Frank T. Bow**: 79,371	
1952	John McSweeney: 82,522	**Frank T. Bow**: 98,447	
1950	John McSweeney: 75,255	Frank T. Bow: 77,306	
1948	John McSweeney: 79,859	Henderson H. Carson: 71,871	
1946	William R. Thom: 51,934	Henderson H. Carson: 65,639	
1944	William R. Thom: 85,755	Henderson H. Carson: 75,921	Harry T. Whiteleather: 1,149
1942	William R. Thom: 45,531	Henderson H. Carson: 50,657	
1940	William R. Thom: 92,469	James Seccombe: 71,629	
1938	William R. Thom: 60,382	James Seccombe: 62,176	
1936	**William R. Thom**: 89,911	H. Ross Ake: 54,979	A. M. Hickey: 4,552; Jacob S. Coxey Sr. (U): 2,384
1934	**William R. Thom**: 59,354	Charles B. McClintock: 45,390	
1932	William R. Thom: 67,670	Charles B. McClintock: 63,609	
1930	William R. Thom: 47,237	**Charles B. McClintock**: 51,113	
1928	John McSweeney: 55,778	Charles B. McClintock: 73,966	Jacob S. Coxey Sr.: 1,428; Carl Guillod (W): 92
1926	**John McSweeney**: 40,283	Charles B. McClintock: 27,116	
1924	**John McSweeney**: 51,491	Thomas C. Hunsicker: 45,559	Jacob S. Coxey Sr.: 2,901
1922	John McSweeney: 43,590	Joseph H. Himes: 39,881	
1920	John McSweeney: 42,799	Joseph H. Himes: 56,584	

== Historical district boundaries ==
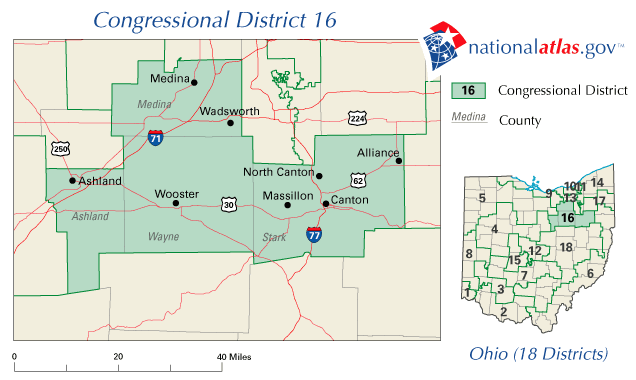
2003 - 2013

== See also ==
- Ohio's congressional districts
- List of United States congressional districts
