= Henderson H. Carson =

American politician (1893–1971)

Henderson Haverfield Carson
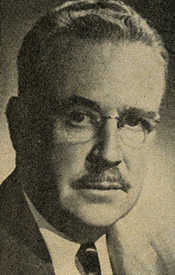

Member of the U.S. House of Representatives from Ohio's 16th district
- In office January 3, 1943 – January 3, 1945
- Preceded by: William R. Thom
- Succeeded by: William R. Thom
- In office January 3, 1947 – January 3, 1949
- Preceded by: William R. Thom
- Succeeded by: John McSweeney

Personal details
- Born: October 25, 1893 Cadiz, Ohio
- Died: October 5, 1971 (aged 77) Canton, Ohio
- Resting place: West Lawn Cemetery
- Party: Republican
- Education: Cleveland Law School; Baldwin–Wallace College

Henderson Haverfield Carson (October 25, 1893 – October 5, 1971) was a U.S. representative from Ohio for two non-consecutive terms in the 1940s.

== Biography ==
Born on a farm near Cadiz, Ohio, Carson attended the public and high schools. Cleveland (Ohio) Law School and Baldwin-Wallace College at Berea, Ohio, LL.B., 1919. He became affiliated with the legal department of the Pennsylvania Railroad Co. in 1915. Enlisted in the Field Artillery in 1918. He was transferred to Base Hospital, One Hundred and Nineteenth Unit, Camp Zachary Taylor, Kentucky, and served there until honorably discharged in 1919 as a corporal. He was admitted to the bar in 1919 and commenced practice in Canton, Ohio, in 1922. He served as member of the faculty of McKinley Law School 1926–1942, where he received his J.D. degree.

=== Congress ===
Carson was elected as a Republican to the Seventy-eighth Congress (January 3, 1943 – January 3, 1945). He was an unsuccessful candidate for reelection in 1944 to the Seventy-ninth Congress.

Carson was elected to the Eightieth Congress (January 3, 1947 – January 3, 1949). He was an unsuccessful candidate for reelection in 1948 to the Eighty-first Congress.

=== Later career and death ===
He resumed the practice of law in Canton, Ohio, and Washington, D.C. Resided in Canton, Ohio, where he died October 5, 1971. He was interred in West Lawn Cemetery.

U.S. House of Representatives
Preceded by William R. Thom	Member of the U.S. House of Representatives from Ohio's 16th congressional district 1943-1945	Succeeded by William R. Thom
Preceded by William R. Thom	Member of the U.S. House of Representatives from Ohio's 16th congressional district 1947-1949	Succeeded by John McSweeney
