= William J. Healy II =

American politician from Ohio

Mayor of Canton, Ohio
- In office January 1, 2008 – December 31, 2015
- Preceded by: Janet Creighton
- Succeeded by: Thomas Bernabei

Member of the Ohio House of Representatives from the 52nd district
- In office January 3, 2005 – December 31, 2007
- Preceded by: Mary Cirelli
- Succeeded by: Stephen Slesnick

Personal details
- Born: William James Healy II; 1962 or 1963 (age 63–64)
- Party: Democratic
- Spouse: Dee
- Children: 1
- Parent: William J. Healy (father)
- Education: Kent State University at Stark; Rowan University; New York University (MBA)
- Occupation: Marketing; consultant; politician

William James Healy II (born 1962 or 1963) is an American politician from Ohio. He served as a member of the Ohio House of Representatives from 2005 to 2007. He served as mayor of Canton, Ohio, from 2008 to 2015.

== Early life ==
William James Healy II was born in 1962 or 1963 to William J. Healy. His father was a member of the Ohio House of Representatives. He graduated from Canton McKinley High School. He graduated with an associate degree from Kent State University at Stark. He graduated with a bachelor's degree from Rowan University and an MBA from New York University's Stern School of Business.

== Career ==
In 1983, Healy ran for trustee of Perry Township, Stark County, Ohio. He then pursued a career in sales and marketing outside Ohio. He worked as a business consultant in New Jersey. He then moved back to Ohio. He is president of Austin Healy Group Inc.

Healy is a Democrat. He lost in a five-way Democratic primary for mayor of Canton in 2003. He was elected in 2004 and 2006 to represent the 52nd district of the Ohio House of Representatives.

Healy was elected as mayor of Canton on November 6, 2007. He lost his re-election campaign in 2015 to Thomas Bernabei. Since his first term crime in the city has gone down 25 percent and the city's unemployment has hit a 30-year low at 5.1% recorded in November 2014.

== Personal life ==
Healy married Dee. They have one son. His sister Joyce Healy-Abrams also ran for a seat in the Ohio House.

== See also ==
- List of mayors of Canton, Ohio
