= James Mathews (American politician) =

American politician

Member of the U.S. House of Representatives from Ohio
- In office March 4, 1841 – March 3, 1845
- Preceded by: Daniel Parkhurst Leadbetter
- Succeeded by: John D. Cummins
- Constituency: 13th district (1841–1843); 16th district (1843–1845)

Member of the Ohio Senate
- In office 1832–1837

Personal details
- Born: June 4, 1805 Liberty, Ohio, U.S.
- Died: March 30, 1887 (aged 81) Knoxville, Iowa, U.S.
- Resting place: Graceland Cemetery
- Party: Democratic

James Mathews (June 4, 1805 – March 30, 1887) was an American lawyer and politician who was a two-term member of the United States House of Representatives from Ohio from 1841 to 1845.

== Early life and career ==
Matthews was born at Liberty, Trumbull County, Ohio. After studying law he was admitted to the Ohio Bar in 1830. He then moved to Coshocton, Ohio, where he practiced law. From 1832 to 1837 Mathews was a member of the Ohio Senate.

== Congress ==
In 1841 he was elected a member of the U.S. House of Representatives from Ohio's 13th congressional district which then covered Knox County, Ohio, Coshocton County, Ohio, Holmes County, Ohio and Tuscarawas County, Ohio.

In 1842 Mathews was re-elected from Ohio's 16th congressional district which only differed from the old 13th in that it did not include Knox County. In 1844 Mathews did not run for re-election.

== Later life ==
In 1855 Mathews moved to Knoxville, Marion County, Iowa. From 1857 to 1859 he served as prosecuting attorney for this county. He also latter served as a professor of pomology at Iowa State College (now Iowa State University) and Knoxville's postmaster.

== Sources ==
- Congressional biography
- Parsons, Stanley B., William W. Beach and Dan Hermann. United States Congressional Districts, 1788-1841. Westport: Greenwood Press, 1978.
- Parsons, Stanley B., William W. Beach and Michael J. Dubin. United States Congressional Districts and Data, 1843-1883. Westport: Greenwood Press, 1986.

U.S. House of Representatives
Preceded by Daniel Parkhurst Leadbetter	United States Representative from Ohio's 13th congressional district March 4, 1841–March 3, 1843	Succeeded by Perley B. Johnson
Preceded by Joshua Reed Giddings	United States Representative from Ohio's 16th congressional district March 4, 1843–March 3, 1845	Succeeded by John D. Cummins
Ohio House of Representatives
Preceded by Charles W. Simmons	Representative from Coshocton County; December 3, 1832-December 1, 1833	Succeeded by John Crowely
Ohio Senate
Preceded by Peres Sprague	Senator from Coshocton, Knox & Holmes County District; December 3, 1838-December 6, 1840	Succeeded by Byram Leonard
