= Atlee Pomerene =

American politician and lawyer (1863–1937)

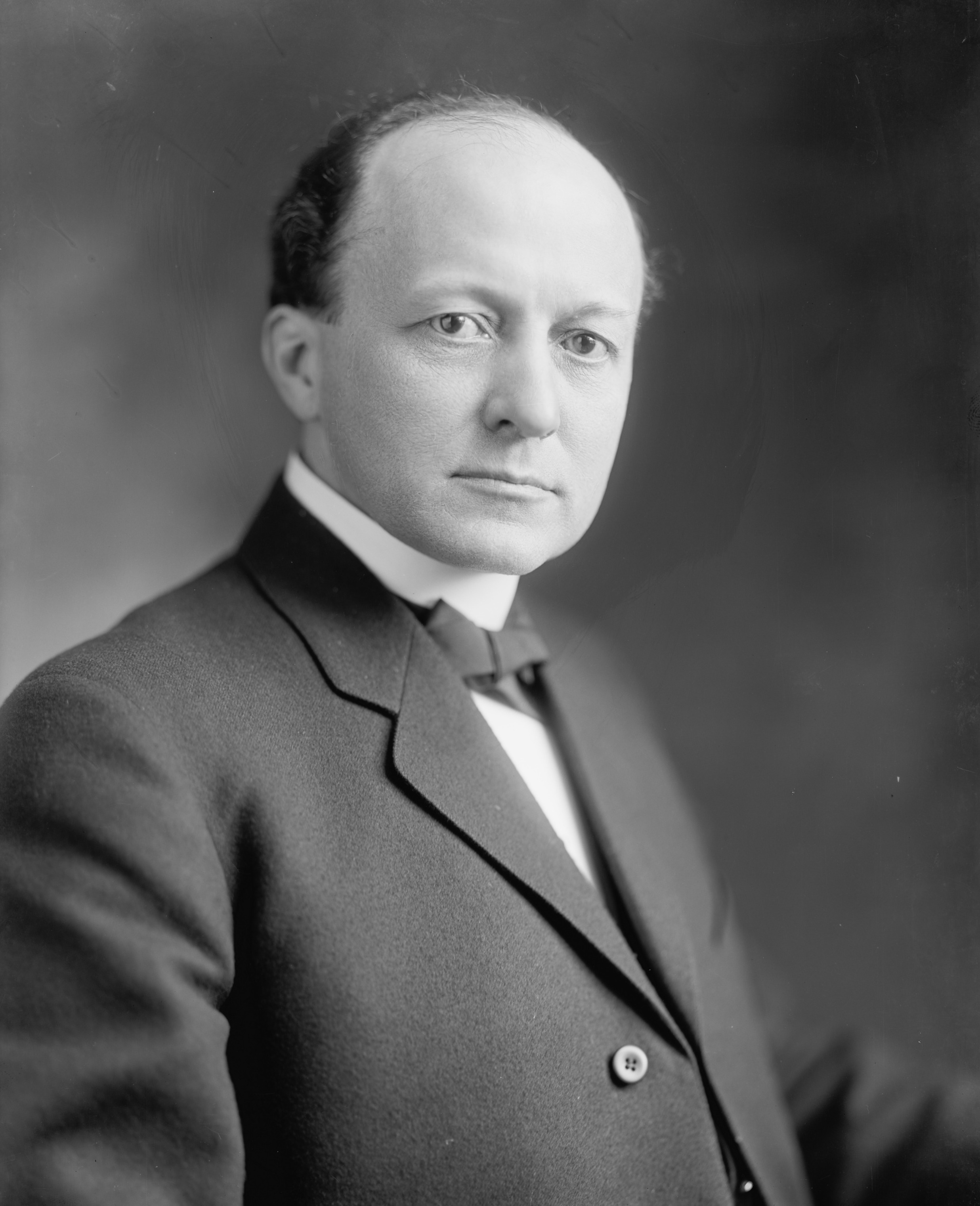
- Pomerene, 1905–1937

United States Senator from Ohio
- In office March 4, 1911 – March 3, 1923
- Preceded by: Charles W. F. Dick
- Succeeded by: Simeon D. Fess

31st Lieutenant Governor of Ohio
- In office January 19, 1911 – March 3, 1911
- Governor: Judson Harmon
- Preceded by: Francis W. Treadway
- Succeeded by: Hugh L. Nichols

Personal details
- Born: December 6, 1863 Berlin, Ohio, U.S.
- Died: November 12, 1937 (aged 73) Cleveland, Ohio, U.S.
- Resting place: West Lawn Cemetery
- Party: Democratic
- Spouse: Mary H. Bockius (m. 1892)
- Education: Princeton University (BA); University of Cincinnati College of Law (LLB)
- Occupation: Politician; lawyer

Atlee Pomerene (December 6, 1863 – November 12, 1937) was an American Democratic Party politician and lawyer from Ohio. He served as Lieutenant Governor of Ohio for a few months in 1911 and then represented Ohio in the United States Senate from 1911 until 1923.

== Early life ==
Atlee Pomerene was born on December 6, 1863, in Berlin, Holmes County, Ohio, to Elizabeth and Peter P. Pomerene. He graduated with high honors from Princeton University in 1884. He graduated from the University of Cincinnati College of Law in 1886 and was admitted to the bar in Ohio.

== Career ==
In 1886, he began practicing law with Charles R. Miller in Canton, Ohio. He then entered a partnership with Judge Robert S. Shields in the firm Shields and Pomerene. He then organized the firm Pomerene, Ambler and Pomerene with Ralph Ambler and his brother Celsus Pomerene. From 1887 to 1901, he served as the city solicitor of Canton. He then worked as prosecutor of Stark County from 1897 to 1900. He prosecuted the homicide case against Anna George for the murder of George Saxton, brother of Ida Saxton McKinley. In 1906, he was appointed a member of the honorary tax commission of Ohio by Governor Andrew L. Harris. In 1910, he was chairman of the state Democratic convention.

After serving in a variety of city, county, and state positions as solicitor and prosecutor, Pomerene was elected the 31st lieutenant governor of Ohio in 1910. He briefly served in the post until January 19, 1911, when he was elected by the State Legislature to the U.S. Senate, succeeding Charles W. F. Dick. In 1913, he was a member of the Senate Banking Currency Commission and assisted in developing the legislation to create the Federal Reserve. Pomerene was re-elected in 1916, defeating Myron T. Herrick. He narrowly lost a bid for a third term six years later to Simeon D. Fess. He ran again the following election, but lost to Frank B. Willis. In 1923, he joined the law firm Squire, Sanders and Dempsey of Cleveland. In March 1923, President Warren Harding named him to the 5th Pan-American Conference held in Santiago, Chile. He was a Democrat.

Pomerene was appointed by President Calvin Coolidge alongside Owen Roberts to serve as a special prosecutor to deal with the Teapot Dome scandal. He ran unsuccessfully for the other U.S. Senate seat from Ohio in 1926 and for the Democratic nomination to the U.S. presidency in 1928. On August 1, 1932, President Herbert Hoover appointed Pomerene to succeed Charles G. Dawes as head of the Reconstruction Finance Corporation after Dawes' sudden resignation on June 7. He served in that role until his retirement on March 4, 1933.

Pomerene then continued practicing law in Cleveland.

== Personal life ==
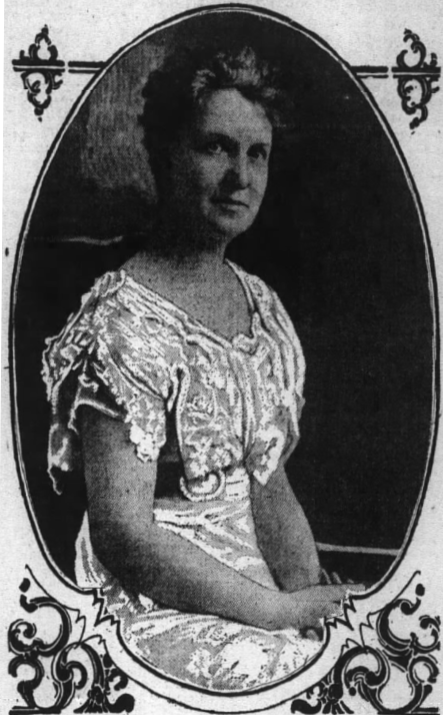
Mary Pomerene in 1915

Pomerene married Mary H. Bockius, daughter of L. V. Bockius, of Canton on June 29, 1892.

Pomerene died following pneumonia and a stroke in Cleveland on November 12, 1937, and was buried in Westlawn Cemetery in Canton.

== Awards and legacy ==
Pomerene received an honorary Doctor of Laws degree from Miami University, Wooster University and Mount Union College. He also received an honorary degree from Kenyon College.

Political offices
Preceded by Francis W. Treadway	Lieutenant Governor of Ohio; 1911	Succeeded by Hugh L. Nichols
U.S. Senate
Preceded by Charles W. F. Dick	U.S. Senator (Class 1) from Ohio; 1911–1923; Served alongside: Theodore E. Burton, Warren G. Harding, Frank B. Willis	Succeeded by Simeon D. Fess
Preceded by Albert B. Cummins	Chair of the Senate Civil Service Committee; 1913–1917	Succeeded by Kenneth McKellar
Preceded by John W. Kern	Chair of the Senate Privileges Committee; 1917–1919	Succeeded by William P. Dillingham
Preceded by Robert M. La Follette	Chair of the Senate District of Columbia Corporations Committee; 1919–1921	Position abolished
Party political offices
First	Democratic nominee for U.S. Senator from Ohio (Class 1); 1916, 1922	Succeeded by Charles V. Truax
Preceded by William Alexander Julian	Democratic nominee for U.S. Senator from Ohio (Class 3); 1926	Succeeded by Graham Hunt
Government offices
Preceded by Charles G. Dawes	Chairman of the Reconstruction Finance Corporation; 1932–1933	Succeeded by Jesse H. Jones
