= William R. Thom =

American lawyer and politician (1885–1960)

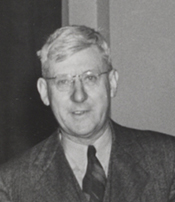

Member of the U.S. House of Representatives from Ohio's 16th district
- In office March 4, 1933 – January 3, 1939
- Preceded by: Charles B. McClintock
- Succeeded by: James Seccombe
- In office January 3, 1941 – January 3, 1943
- Preceded by: James Seccombe
- Succeeded by: Henderson H. Carson
- In office January 3, 1945 – January 3, 1947
- Preceded by: Henderson H. Carson
- Succeeded by: Henderson H. Carson

Personal details
- Born: William Richard Thom; July 7, 1885 Canton, Ohio
- Died: August 28, 1960 (aged 75) Canton, Ohio
- Resting place: West Lawn Cemetery
- Party: Democratic
- Education: Western Reserve University; Georgetown University Law Center

William Richard Thom (July 7, 1885 – August 28, 1960) was an American lawyer and politician who served three non-consecutive stints as a U.S. representative from Ohio in the mid-19th century.

== Biography ==
Born in Canton, Ohio, Thom attended the public schools. He engaged as a newspaper reporter from 1905 to 1909. He attended Western Reserve University, Cleveland, Ohio from 1909 to 1911.

=== Congressional staff ===
He served as private secretary to Congressman John J. Whitacre 1911–1913. He served as member of the United States House of Representatives Press Galleries in 1915 and 1916.

=== Legal career ===
He was graduated from the law department of Georgetown University, Washington, D.C., in 1916. He was admitted to the bar in 1917 and commenced practice in Canton, Ohio.

He served as member of the park commission of Canton from 1920 to 1932. He was an unsuccessful candidate for the Democratic nomination to Congress in 1920.

=== Congress ===
Thom was elected as a Democrat to the Seventy-third, Seventy-fourth, and Seventy-fifth Congresses (March 4, 1933 – January 3, 1939). He was an unsuccessful candidate for reelection in 1938 to the Seventy-sixth Congress.

He resumed the practice of law.

Thom was elected to the Seventy-seventh Congress (January 3, 1941 – January 3, 1943). He was an unsuccessful candidate for reelection in 1942 to the Seventy-eighth Congress.

Thom was elected to the Seventy-ninth Congress (January 3, 1945 – January 3, 1947). He was an unsuccessful candidate for reelection in 1946 to the Eightieth Congress.

=== Later career and death ===
He resumed the practice of law. He served as delegate to the 1956 Democratic National Convention.

He died in Canton, Ohio, August 28, 1960. He was interred in West Lawn Cemetery.

== Sources ==
- United States Congress. "William R. Thom (id: T000155)". Biographical Directory of the United States Congress.

U.S. House of Representatives
Preceded by Charles B. McClintock	Member of the U.S. House of Representatives from Ohio's 16th congressional district 1933–1939	Succeeded by James Seccombe
Preceded by James Seccombe	Member of the U.S. House of Representatives from Ohio's 16th congressional district 1941–1943	Succeeded by Henderson H. Carson
Preceded by Henderson H. Carson	Member of the U.S. House of Representatives from Ohio's 16th congressional district 1945–1947	Succeeded by Henderson H. Carson
