= Frank T. Bow =

American politician

Frank Bow
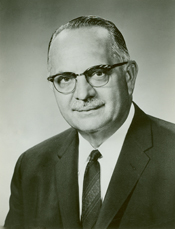

Member of the U.S. House of Representatives from Ohio's 16th district
- In office January 3, 1951 – November 13, 1972
- Preceded by: John McSweeney
- Succeeded by: Ralph Regula

Personal details
- Born: Frank Townsend Bow; February 20, 1901 Canton, Ohio, U.S.
- Died: November 13, 1972 (aged 71) Bethesda, Maryland, U.S.
- Resting place: West Lawn Cemetery; Canton, Ohio, U.S.
- Party: Republican
- Spouse: Caroline Bow
- Education: Ohio Northern University; Columbia Law School

Frank Townsend Bow (February 20, 1901 – November 13, 1972) was an American politician. A member of the Republican Party, he served as a U.S. representative from Ohio's 16th congressional district from 1951 until his death in 1972. At the time of his death, Bow was confirmed to serve as the next U.S. ambassador to Panama, but had not yet stepped into that role.

== Biography ==
Born in Canton, Ohio, Bow attended college at Ohio Northern University, where he was a member of the Sigma Pi fraternity, and law school at Columbia Law School. He was admitted to the Ohio bar in 1923 when he returned to Canton to practice law. The Frank T. Bow Federal Building and United States Courthouse in Canton is named in his honor.

=== Career ===
In 1929, Bow was appointed as Ohio's assistant attorney general. In 1932, he was hired by WHBC, a Canton area radio station. During World War II, he worked as the station's overseas correspondent, traveling to cover the war in the Philippines. During the Eightieth United States Congress, Bow was hired as part of the general counsel to the Expenditures Committee. Senator Andrew F. Schoeppel hired him as a legislative aide during the next Congress.

=== Congress ===
In 1950, Bow was elected to the House of Representatives. He was a close ally of Dwight D. Eisenhower and a staunch supporter of tax reform. Bow voted in favor of the Civil Rights Acts of 1957, 1960, 1964, and 1968, but did not vote on the Voting Rights Act of 1965.

=== Death ===
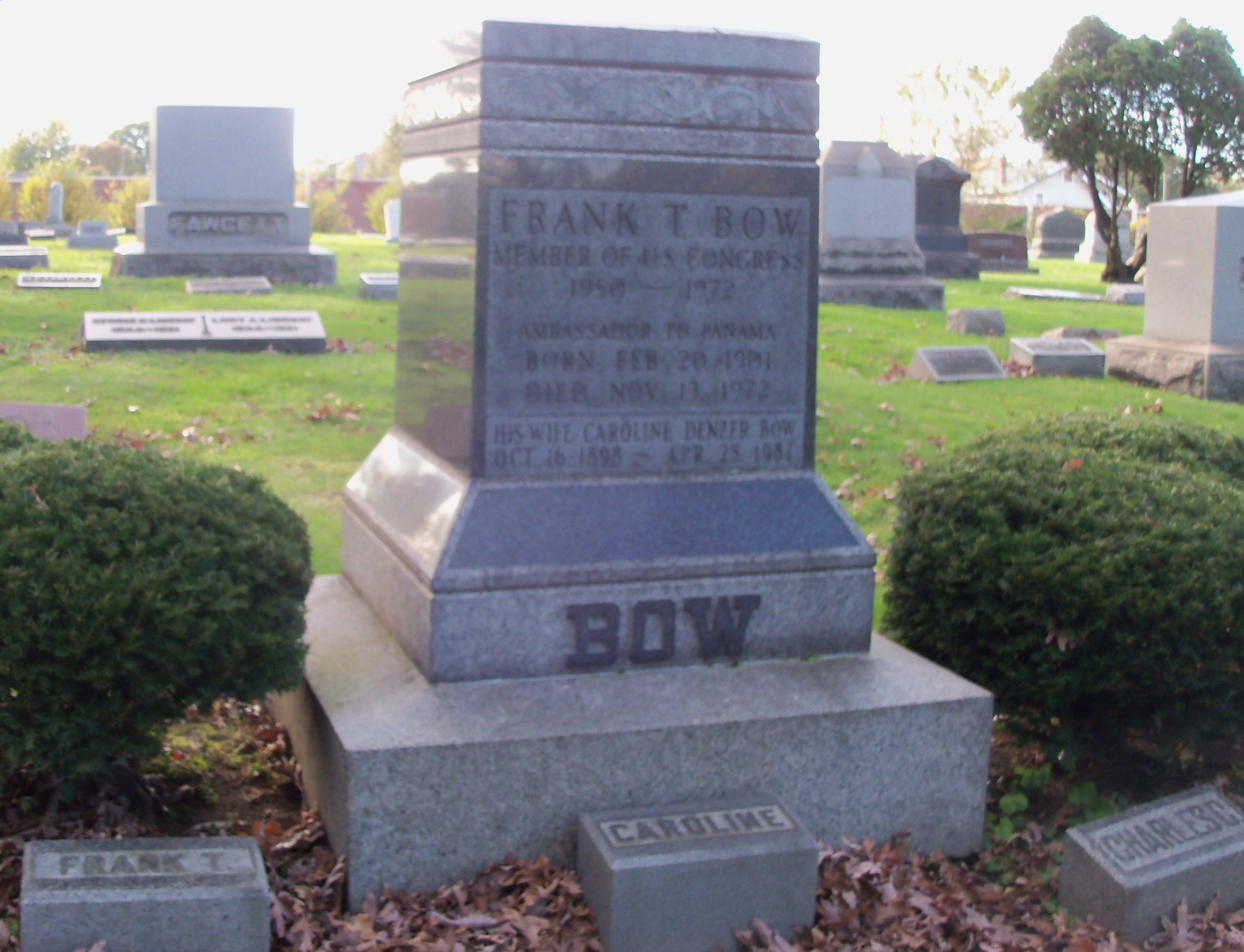
Grave of Bow at West Lawn Cemetery

In 1972, Bow announced his retirement from Congress and was set to become the next U.S. ambassador to Panama after his congressional term ended, having been confirmed by the U.S. Senate on September 8, but died of heart failure at Bethesda Naval Hospital on November 13, 1972, before he was sworn in. He was buried at West Lawn Cemetery in Canton.

== See also ==
- List of members of the United States Congress who died in office (1950–1999)

== Sources ==
U.S. House of Representatives
Preceded by John McSweeney	Member of the U.S. House of Representatives from Ohio's 16th district 1951 - 1972	Succeeded by Ralph S. Regula
