= Senator Justice =

Senator Justice may refer to:

- Jim Justice (born 1951), U.S. Senator from West Virginia
- Charlie Justice (politician) (born 1968), Florida State Senate
- Robert Justice (1809–1889), Ohio State Senate
- Ron Justice (fl. 2000s–2010s), Oklahoma State Senate

== See also ==
- Jolie Justus (born 1971), Missouri State Senate
