= Mary Cirelli =

American politician (1939–2025)

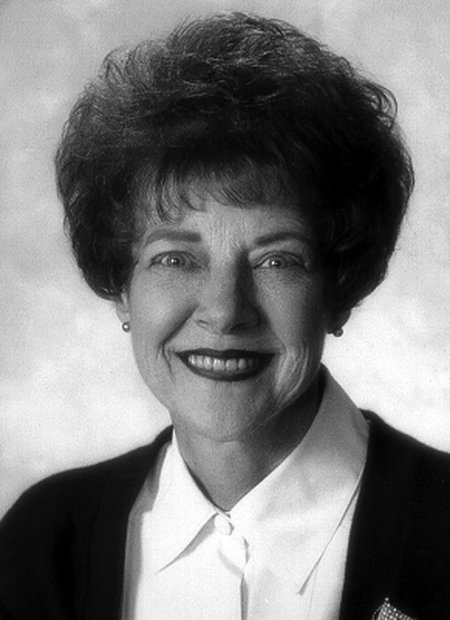

Member of the Ohio House of Representatives from the 52nd district
- In office January 3, 2001 – January 3, 2005
- Preceded by: William J. Healy
- Succeeded by: William J. Healy II

Personal details
- Born: Mary Minarcheck; July 4, 1939 Uniontown, Pennsylvania, U.S.
- Died: March 12, 2025 (aged 85)
- Party: Democratic

Mary Cirelli Fawcett (née Minarcheck; July 4, 1939 – March 12, 2025) was an American politician who served as a member of the Ohio House of Representatives, representing the 52nd District from 2001 to 2005.

== Early life ==
Born July 4, 1939, into a family of miners, Cirelli served as a nurse, state representative, city councilor, and county commissioner.

== Career ==
Cirelli served on the Canton, Ohio city council as the ward 3 member from 1984 to 1990. She then served as a Stark County, Ohio commissioner beginning in 1981 but lost re-election in 1994. She served, again, on the Canton city council from 1996 to 1999 as an at-large member. She won election to the Ohio House of Representatives and served from 2001 to 2005. Finally, she won election as an at-large Canton council member and served once more from 2007 to 2013, when she unsuccessfully ran for city treasurer.

== Death ==
Cirelli died from heart failure and kidney disease on March 12, 2025, at the age of 85. Both of her husbands had predeceased her.
