= Charles B. McClintock =

American lawyer and politician

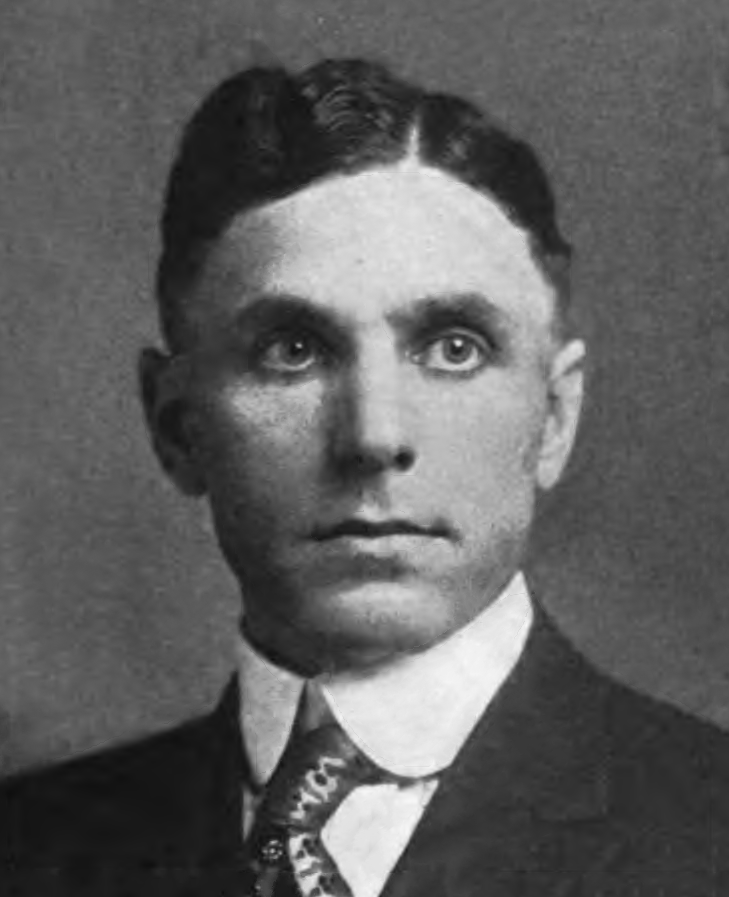

Member of the U.S. House of Representatives from Ohio's 16th district
- In office March 4, 1929 – March 3, 1933
- Preceded by: John McSweeney
- Succeeded by: William R. Thom

Personal details
- Born: Charles Blaine McClintock; May 25, 1886 Paint Township, Wayne County, Ohio
- Died: February 1, 1965 (aged 78) Canton, Ohio
- Resting place: Greenlawn Cemetery, Wilmot, Ohio
- Party: Republican
- Education: College of Wooster, Case Western Reserve University School of Law

Charles Blaine McClintock (May 25, 1886 – February 1, 1965) was an American lawyer and politician who served two terms as a Republican U.S. Representative from Ohio from 1929 to 1933.

== Biography ==
Born in Paint Township, Wayne County, Ohio, near Beach City, Stark County, McClintock was educated in the public schools. He attended Wooster (Ohio) University, and was graduated from the law school of Western Reserve University, Cleveland, Ohio, in 1912. He was admitted to the bar the same year and commenced law practice in Canton, Ohio. He served as assistant prosecuting attorney of Stark County 1919–1923 and prosecuting attorney 1923–1927.

=== Congress ===
McClintock was elected as a Republican to the Seventy-first and Seventy-second Congresses (March 4, 1929 – March 3, 1933). He was an unsuccessful candidate for reelection in 1932 to the Seventy-third Congress and for election in 1934 to the Seventy-fourth Congress. He resumed the practice of law.

=== Later career and death ===
McClintock was elected in 1946 as a judge of the court of appeals from the fifth appellate district of Ohio. He was reelected in 1952 and again in 1958. He retired in March 1963. He died in Canton, Ohio, February 1, 1965. He was interred in Greenlawn Cemetery, Wilmot, Ohio.

== Sources ==
- United States Congress. "Charles B. McClintock (id: M000339)". Biographical Directory of the United States Congress.

U.S. House of Representatives
Preceded by John McSweeney	Member of the U.S. House of Representatives from Ohio's 16th congressional district 1929-1933	Succeeded by William R. Thom
