= Daniel Parkhurst Leadbetter =

American politician

Member of the U.S. House of Representatives from Ohio's 13th district
- In office March 4, 1837 – March 3, 1841
- Preceded by: David Spangler
- Succeeded by: James Mathews

Personal details
- Born: September 10, 1797 Pittsfield, Massachusetts, U.S.
- Died: February 26, 1870 (aged 72) Millersburg, Ohio, U.S.
- Resting place: Oak Hill Cemetery
- Party: Democratic

Daniel Parkhurst Leadbetter (September 10, 1797 – February 26, 1870) was a two-term U.S. representative from Ohio.

He retired from office before the end of the decade, although he had support to run again. Later, he served in the American Civil War as a captain. Settling in Millersburg, the county seat of Holmes County, Ohio, he and his brother, Moses Leadbetter, eventually came to own almost half the town. Their family remained prominent there for decades.

He was also a relation through marriage of a prominent Millersburg citizen, Robert Justice.

== Biography ==
Leadbetter was born in Pittsfield, Massachusetts, on September 10, 1797. He attended the common schools; moved to Ohio in 1816 and settled in Steubenville, Ohio, where he studied law; was admitted to the bar in 1821 and commenced practice in Steubenville.

Leadbetter was commissioned captain of the Second Company, Third Regiment, Sixth Division, Ohio Militia, in 1821. He moved to Millersburg in 1828 and continued the practice of law. He was commissioned quartermaster of the Fourth Division of the Ohio Militia in 1831 and was county recorder 1831–1836.

He was elected as a Democrat to the 25th and 26th Congresses, (March 4, 1837 – March 3, 1841); was not a candidate for renomination in 1840. He resumed the practice of his profession; also engaged in agricultural pursuits and stock raising. He was a member of the State constitutional convention in 1851 and served as a captain in the American Civil War in 1862. He died in Millersburg, Ohio, on February 26, 1870; interment in Oak Hill Cemetery.

U.S. House of Representatives
Preceded by David Spangler	Member of the U.S. House of Representatives from Ohio's 13th congressional district March 4, 1837-March 3, 1841	Succeeded by James Mathews
