= Robert S. Shields =

American judge, lawyer and politician (1845–1934)

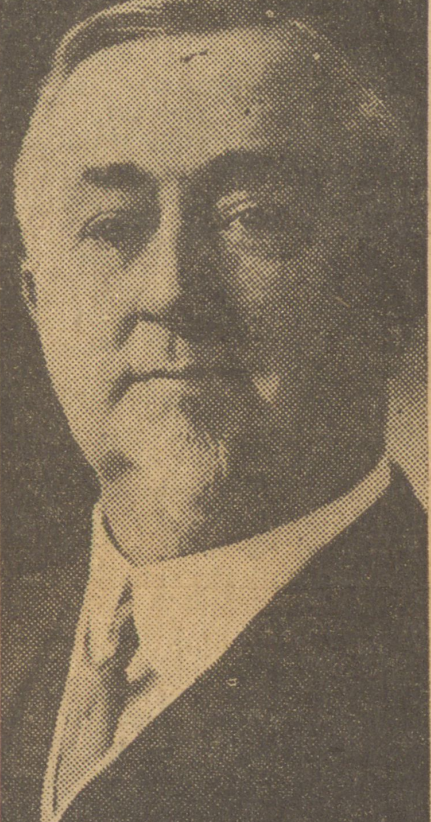

United States Attorney for the Northern District of Ohio
- In office May 6, 1886 – 1889
- Preceded by: E. H. Eggleston
- Succeeded by: Isaac N. Alexander

Mayor of Canton, Ohio
- In office January 1, 1871 – December 31, 1874
- Preceded by: H. S. Belden
- Succeeded by: A. D. Braden

Personal details
- Born: Robert Strader Shields; September 24, 1845 Washington, New Jersey, U.S.
- Died: April 21, 1934 (aged 88) Canton, Ohio, U.S.
- Party: Democratic Party
- Spouse: Rosa Paige (m. 1894; died 1917)
- Children: 2
- Education: Union College (AB)

Robert Strader Shields (September 28, 1845 – April 21, 1934) was an American lawyer, judge and Democratic Party politician. Born in New Jersey, Shields studied at Union College and briefly lived in New York City before reading law with his uncle in Ohio. After passing the bar exam, he began practice as an attorney in Stark County, where he would reside for the next six decades.

An able attorney, Shields's practice with future Senator Atlee Pomerene was reputedly one of the best in the county. He was elected Mayor of Canton and Appeals Court judge, and served as U.S. District Court Attorney under Grover Cleveland. An active Democrat, Shields nevertheless made friends with President William McKinley and his wife, Ida Saxton McKinley, and would be intermingled in the family's legal affairs for years.

Shields married the daughter of a Canton merchant but both she and their two children predeceased him; he died at his home aged 88 in 1934.

== Early life and education ==
Robert Strader Shields was born on September 28, 1845, in Washington, Warren County, New Jersey. He was one of eleven children born to Anna (née Hance) and William Shields; as of March 28, 1925, two sisters remained living: Anna Stryker and Jennie Karr, both still living in New Jersey. Robert attended preparatory school at the Allentown Seminary (now Muhlenberg College) in Pennsylvania before enrolling at Union College in Schenectady, New York, in 1863. While at university, Shields received the junior oratorical prize and joined the Zeta Psi fraternity (induction date September 22, 1864). Shields graduated with a Bachelor of Arts in 1867 and afterwards read law under future U.S. Minister to Russia Edwin W. Stoughton for eighteen months in New York City.

== Career ==
=== Lawyer and elected official ===
Shields finished his legal education under his uncle, Judge Joseph C. Hance of New Philadelphia, Ohio, and was admitted to the bar in 1870 by examination before Judge George W. Mellvaine of Cadiz. He subsequently moved to Canton, Ohio, opening an office there; he would remain a practicing attorney in Stark County for the next six decades. Shields was elected the Democratic mayor of Canton in 1870, and was successfully re-elected in 1872.

Shields's term as mayor ended in 1874; however, from his good reputation, he attracted "a good clientage" to his practice and was elected prosecuting attorney of Stark County two years later. During his two-term tenure of 1876–1880, Shields notably represented the state in the widely publicized 1879 trial of Gustave A. Ohr and George E. Mann, two teenage runaways accused of murdering their fellow tramp; they were hanged in 1880 before a crowd of 10,000. After these terms too expired, Shields returned to municipal affairs, serving as president of the Canton City Council from 1880 through 1884.

In 1885, Democratic President Grover Cleveland appointed Shields U.S. District Attorney for Northern Ohio following a vacancy left by the suspension of E. H. Eggleston. He effectively assumed office on July 1, 1885, but was officially confirmed by the Senate on May 6, 1886. For many months, Shields traveled 58 miles every week to and from the district office in Cleveland and his home in Canton (court adjourning on Sundays) to be with his family, but was not reimbursed the prescribed 10 cents per mile for travel. Shields later sued, but the Supreme Court ruled in US v. Shields (1894) that attorneys did not deserve reimbursement for travel for non-official purposes. Records and correspondence relating to Shields's career as District Attorney are stored with the U.S. National Archives, including his involvement with the investigation into fraudulent fees collected from Civil War pensioners by John A. Chase of Toledo. In 1889, Shields resigned his office to return to private practice, and was replaced by Isaac N. Alexander (whose own Senate confirmation took place on January 9, 1890). Shields worked for the following thirty years with George E. Baldwin, and together their partnership "was one of the leading law firms in the county", with clients across northern Ohio. The relationship lasted until Baldwin (who also served briefly as Circuit Judge in 1895) was appointed consul to Nuremberg, Germany by President McKinley, and then fell ill and died. Afterward, Shields partnered with future Democratic Senator Atlee Pomerene, also to great success.

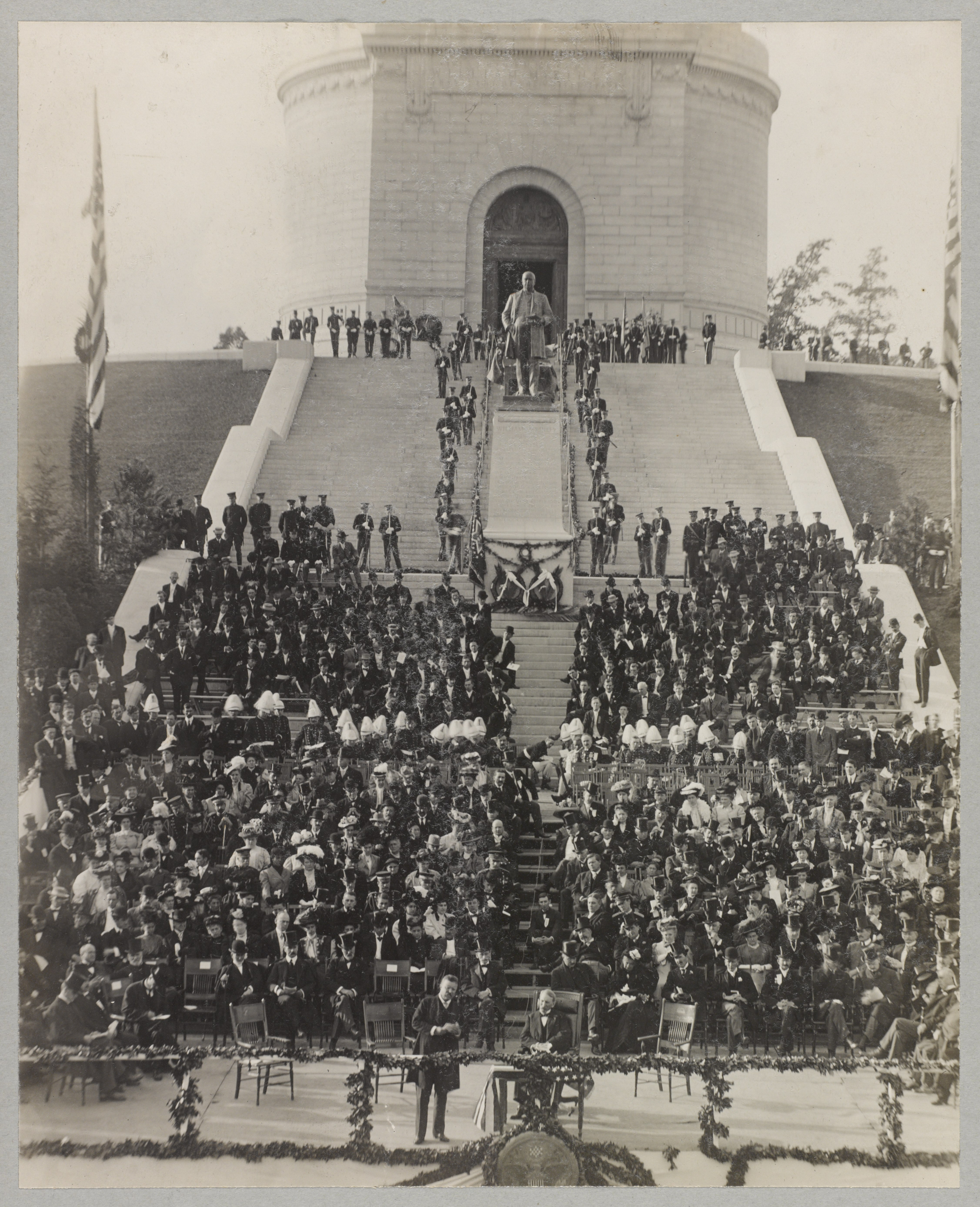
The McKinley National Memorial in Canton, wherein William, Ida and their young daughters were laid to rest, being dedicated by President Theodore Roosevelt in 1907. Shields served on the reception committee of the McKinley National Memorial Association.

=== Association with the McKinley family ===
Despite being an active Democrat, serving as a delegate to the Democratic National Conventions of 1876, 1880 and 1884 (the last of which nominated Cleveland and Hendricks), Shields came to know fellow Cantonian lawyer and Republican president William McKinley and his wife, Ida. In 1901, Robert and Clara Shields attended a dinner given by the McKinleys in Canton, the last function they held before William was assassinated. Afterwards, Shields served on the McKinley National Memorial Association; he also was a pallbearer at Ida's funeral in 1907.

Shields was involved in two lawsuits relating to the McKinley family. In 1895, he was named the estate administrator of Abner McKinley, one of the late president's brothers who died in 1904 owing US$60,000 to creditors in Ohio. In 1907, Shields charged Abner's widow and the executrix of his estate, Anna, with fraudulent conveyance, because Abner had transferred to her real estate in Canton in 1904 despite, as Shields alleged, both of them knowing that Abner was insolvent; Anna later counter-sued to try and have the debt set aside. Additionally, after Ida's death, some of William's relatives tried suing her sister and heir, Mary Barber, as well as Shields for control of her estate. However, in 1912, the Supreme Court of Ohio affirmed the county court's ruling that Ida's estate belonged to Barber and her husband.

=== Judgeship and later career ===
In 1910, Shields was elected to the Fifth District of the Ohio Circuit Court, which became the Court of Appeals in 1912, and was continually re-elected through 1928. Among the rulings he authored was Commonwealth Casualty Co. v. Wheeler (1919), which expanded the otherwise strict definition for "accidental death" in Ohio insurance law. When his term finished, Shields opened his office in the First National Bank Building of Canton, ending his career and life (for he was mentally active till his final days) with the firm of Shields, Thomas & Van Nostran. He was also recorded in 1918 as being a director of the Central Savings Bank Company of Canton.

== Personal life ==
On December 18, 1871, in Canton, Shields married Clara A. Wikidal, the daughter of Martin Wikidal, a Canton merchant, banker and city councilman from Dědice, Moravia, Bohemia; and of Fredericka Schaefer, of Baerenthal, France. The two remained married until her death on June 5, 1917. They had two children, of whom one, Clara, survived childhood; she married the mineral water tycoon and banker Carl R. Schultz in 1899 and had no children before their divorce in 1910. She was not listed as having survived her father in his obituary, though four nieces were.

Shields died at his home on April 22, 1934, of unspecified illness and old age; he was 88 years old, and had practiced law in Stark County for 65. A Presbyterian as of 1925, he was nevertheless affiliated with the Trinity Lutheran Church, and his funeral services were led by the Lutheran E. C. Herman and the Baptist J. H. Satterfield at Shields's Canton home. Shields was a 32nd degree Freemason of the Scottish Rite as well as a Knight Templar. Shields was a devoted gardener who wore his favorite flower as a boutonnière; he was also one of the last people in Canton to move from a horse and carriage to an automobile, although once he did, he went on daily rides with his dog and his coachman-turned-chauffeur.
