= James Seccombe =

American politician (1893–1970)

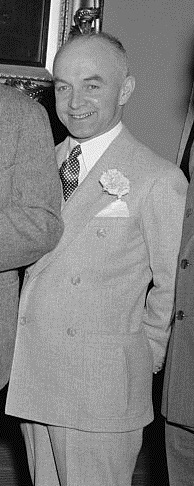
- In Washington, D. C., May 4, 1939.

Member of the U.S. House of Representatives from Ohio's 16th district
- In office January 3, 1939 – January 3, 1941
- Preceded by: William R. Thom
- Succeeded by: William R. Thom

Personal details
- Born: February 12, 1893 Mineral City, Ohio
- Died: August 23, 1970 (aged 77) Canton, Ohio
- Resting place: North Lawn Cemetery, Canton, Ohio
- Party: Republican

James Seccombe (February 12, 1893 – August 23, 1970) was a United States representative from Ohio for one term from 1939 to 1941.

== Biography ==
He was born in Mineral City, Tuscarawas County, Ohio. He moved with his parents to Canton, Ohio, in 1906. He attended the public schools in Mineral City and Canton, Ohio. During the First World War, he served in the United States Army from July 17, 1917, with service overseas, until discharged April 10, 1919. He then worked in various factories as machinist and foreman from 1913 to 1932. He attended the Y.M.C.A. night school of automobile engineering in 1930 and 1931.

Seccombe was member of the Canton City Council 1928-1933 and served as vice president, president, and mayor. He was a delegate to the Republican State conventions at Canton, Ohio, in 1932, 1934, and 1936. He was elected mayor of Canton in 1935 and served until his resignation in December 1938. He was elected as a Republican to the Seventy-sixth Congress (January 3, 1939 - January 3, 1941) but was an unsuccessful candidate for reelection in 1940 to the Seventy-seventh Congress. He served as State tax examiner, Canton, Ohio, in 1941 and 1942. He was also director of Stark County Board of Elections, 1942–1970 and the president of the Ohio Association of Election Officials in 1959. He died in Canton, Ohio, in 1970. He was buried in North Lawn Cemetery.

== See also ==
- List of mayors of Canton, Ohio

U.S. House of Representatives
| Preceded by William R. Thom | Member of the U.S. House of Representatives from Ohio's 16th congressional district 1939-1941 | Succeeded by William R. Thom |
