= List of mayors of Canton, Ohio =

The following is a list of mayors of the city of Canton, Ohio, United States.

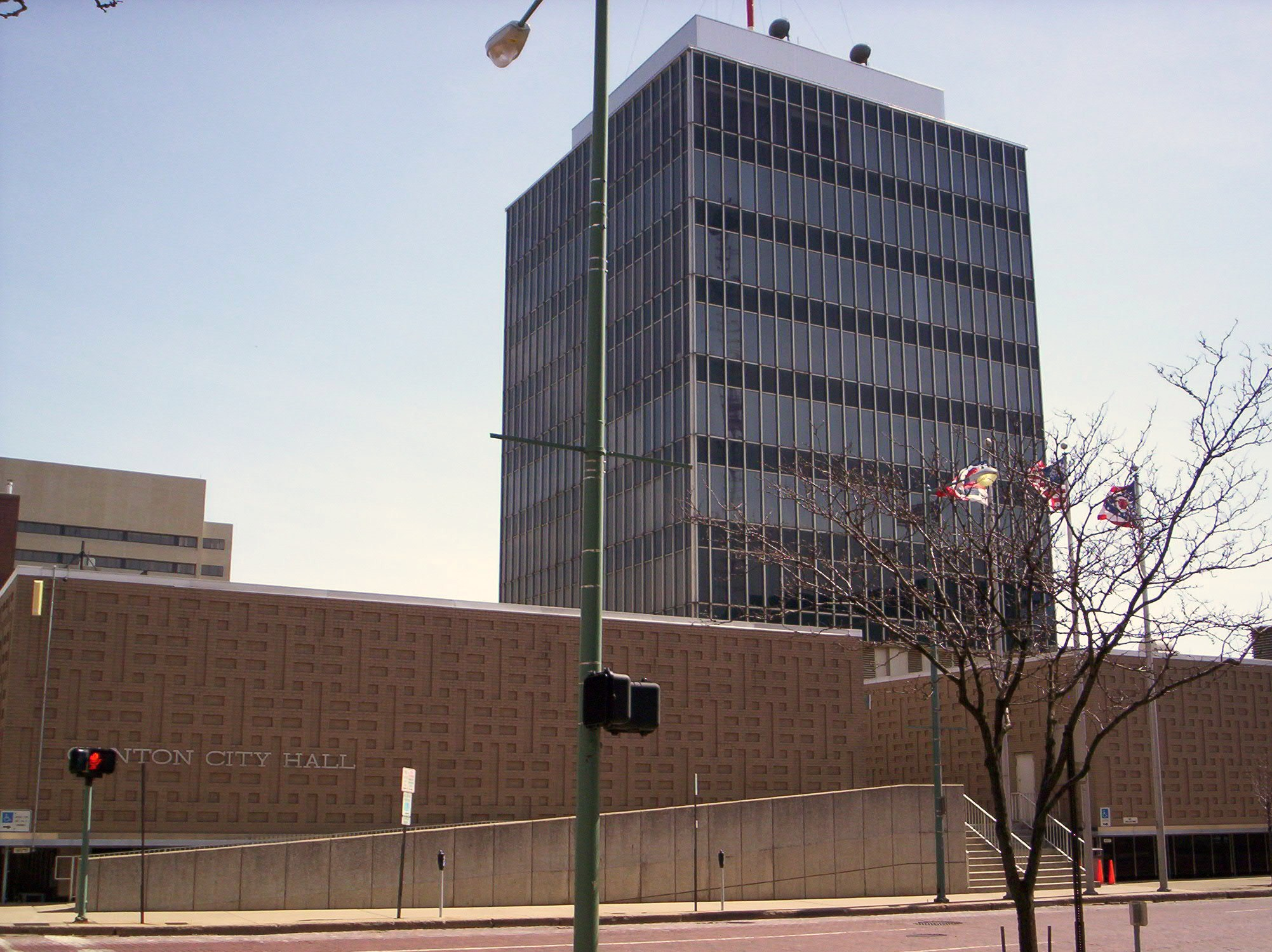
City hall building in Canton, Ohio (photo 2010)

== Presidents ==
- J. W. Lathrop, 1822-1823
- James Hazlett, 1824, 1835
- Orlando Metcalf, 1825-1827
- John Myers, 1828, 1831-1832
- John Shorb, 1829
- L. B. Gitchel, 1830
- Sanders Van Rensellear, 1833-1834
- F. A. Schneider, 1836
- Samuel Fahnestock, 1837

== Mayors ==
- John Myers, 1838-1839
- Jacob Rex, 1839-1840
- John Myers, 1840-1841
- William Bryce, 1841-1842
- Lewis Vail, 1842-1844
- Geo. Dunbar Sr., 1844-1845
- Z. Snow, 1845-1846
- C. C. A. Witting, 1846-1847, 1848-1849
- Daniel Gotshall, 1847-1848
- D. H. Harmann, 1849-1850
- J. G. Lester, 1850-1852
- Benjamin F. Leiter, 1852-1853, 1854-1855
- John Lahm, 1853-1854
- Peter Chance, 1855-1859
- J. C. Bockius, 1859
- H. P. Dunbar, 1860-1862
- Seraphim Meyer, 1862
- J. Crevoisie, 1863-1865
- W. W. Clark, 1865-1867
- Daniel Sayler, 1867-1871
- Robert S. Shields, 1871-1875
- A. D. Braden, 1875-1877
- John Shimp, 1877-1879
- James Vallely, 1879-1881
- William J. Piero, 1881-1885
- George Rex, 1885-1887
- John F. Blake, 1887-1893
- Robt. A. Cassidy, 1893-1895
- James Allen Rice, 1895-1899
- James H. Robertson, 1899-1903
- W. H. Smith, 1903-1906
- A. R. Turnbull, 1906-1914
- Chas. A. Stolberg, 1914-1917
- Henry A. Schrantz, 1917, 1919
- Chas. E. Poorman, 1918-1919
- Herman R. Witter, 1920-1922, 1930-1931
- C. C. Curtis, 1922-1924, 1928-1930
- Chas. M. Ball, 1924-1926
- Stanford M. Swarts, 1926-1928
- James Seccombe, 1932-1933, 1936-1939
- Arthur Turnbull, 1934-1935
- Edward Folk, 1939-1943
- Albert Fromm, 1943
- Carl Klein, 1944-1949
- Thomas H. Nichols, 1950-1951
- Carl F. Wise, 1952-1958
- Charles L. Babcock, 1958-1961
- James Lawhun, 1962-1963
- Stanley Cmich, 1964-1983
- Sam Purses, 1984-1991
- Richard D. Watkins, 1992-2003
- Janet Weir Creighton, 2004-2007
- William J. Healy II, 2008-2015
- Thomas M. Bernabei, 2016-2023
- William V. Sherer II, 2024-present

== See also ==
- Canton history
