= Moses Hoagland =

American politician

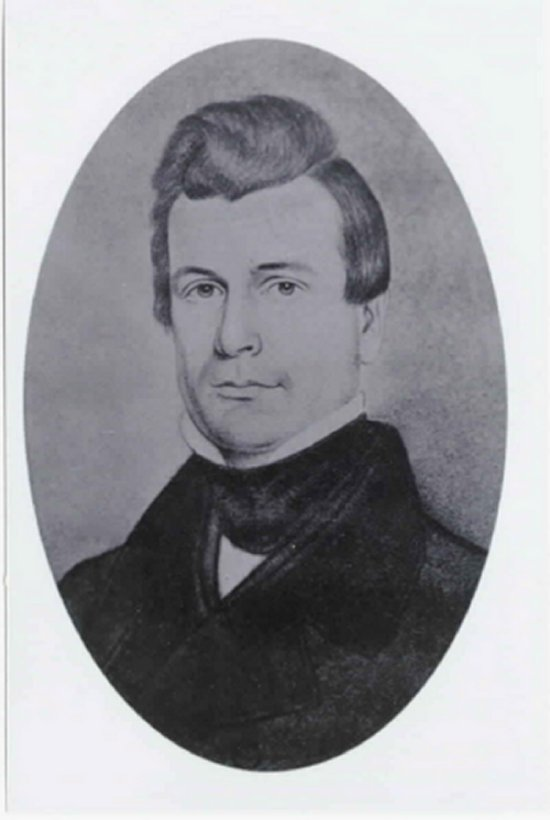

Member of the U.S. House of Representatives from Ohio's 16th district
- In office March 4, 1849 – March 3, 1851
- Preceded by: John D. Cummins
- Succeeded by: John Johnson

Personal details
- Born: June 19, 1812 Baltimore County, Maryland, US
- Died: April 16, 1865 (aged 52) Millersburg, Ohio, US
- Resting place: Oak Hill Cemetery
- Party: Democratic

Moses Hoagland (June 19, 1812 – April 16, 1865) was an American lawyer and politician who served one term as a U.S. representative from Ohio from 1849 to 1851,

== Biography ==
Born near Baltimore, Maryland, Hoagland attended the local public schools. He studied law and was admitted to the bar in 1842, commencing practice in Millersburg, Ohio.

=== Mexican-American War ===
He served in the Ohio infantry during the Mexican War and was promoted to the rank of major for bravery in action.

=== Congress ===
Hoagland was elected as a Democrat to the Thirty-first Congress (March 4, 1849 – March 3, 1851). He was an unsuccessful candidate for reelection in 1850 to the Thirty-second Congress.

=== Later career ===
After leaving Congress, he returned home to resume the practice of law. He was appointed associate justice for the Territory of Washington on June 21, 1853, but declined to accept the position.

=== Death and burial ===
He died in Millersburg and was interred in Oak Hill Cemetery.

== Sources ==
- United States Congress. "Moses Hoagland (id: H000651)". Biographical Directory of the United States Congress.

U.S. House of Representatives
Preceded by John D. Cummins	Member of the U.S. House of Representatives from Ohio's 15th congressional district 1849–1851	Succeeded by John Johnson
