= David Spangler (politician) =

American politician (1796–1856)

Member of the U.S. House of Representatives from Ohio's 13th district
- In office March 4, 1833 – March 3, 1837
- Preceded by: Elisha Whittlesey
- Succeeded by: Daniel Parkhurst Leadbetter

Personal details
- Born: David Spangler; December 2, 1796 Sharpsburg, Maryland, U.S.
- Died: October 18, 1856 (aged 59) Coshocton, Ohio, U.S.
- Resting place: South Lawn Cemetery, Coshocton
- Party: Anti-Jacksonian

David Spangler (December 2, 1796 – October 18, 1856) was an American lawyer and politician who served two terms as a U.S. representative from Ohio from 1833 to 1837.

== Biography ==
Born in Sharpsburg, Maryland, Spangler moved with his parents to Zanesville, Ohio, in 1802. He attended public schools and worked at the blacksmith's trade before engaging in mercantile pursuits. Spangler then studied law and was admitted to the bar in 1824. He commenced practice in Zanesville.

=== Congress ===
He was an unsuccessful candidate for election to the state house of representatives in 1830. He then moved to Coshocton, Ohio, in 1832 and continued to practice law. Spangler was elected as an Anti-Jacksonian to the Twenty-third and Twenty-fourth Congresses (March 4, 1833 – March 3, 1837).

=== Retirement and death ===
He declined candidacy for renomination in 1836 and for the nomination for Governor of Ohio in 1844.

=== Death ===
Spangler died in Coshocton on October 18, 1856, and was interred in South Lawn Cemetery.

== Sources ==
- United States Congress. "David Spangler (id: S000699)". Biographical Directory of the United States Congress.

U.S. House of Representatives
Preceded by Elisha Whittlesey	Member of the U.S. House of Representatives from Ohio's 13th congressional district March 4, 1833-March 3, 1837	Succeeded by Daniel P. Leadbetter
