= John Johnson (Ohio congressman) =

American politician

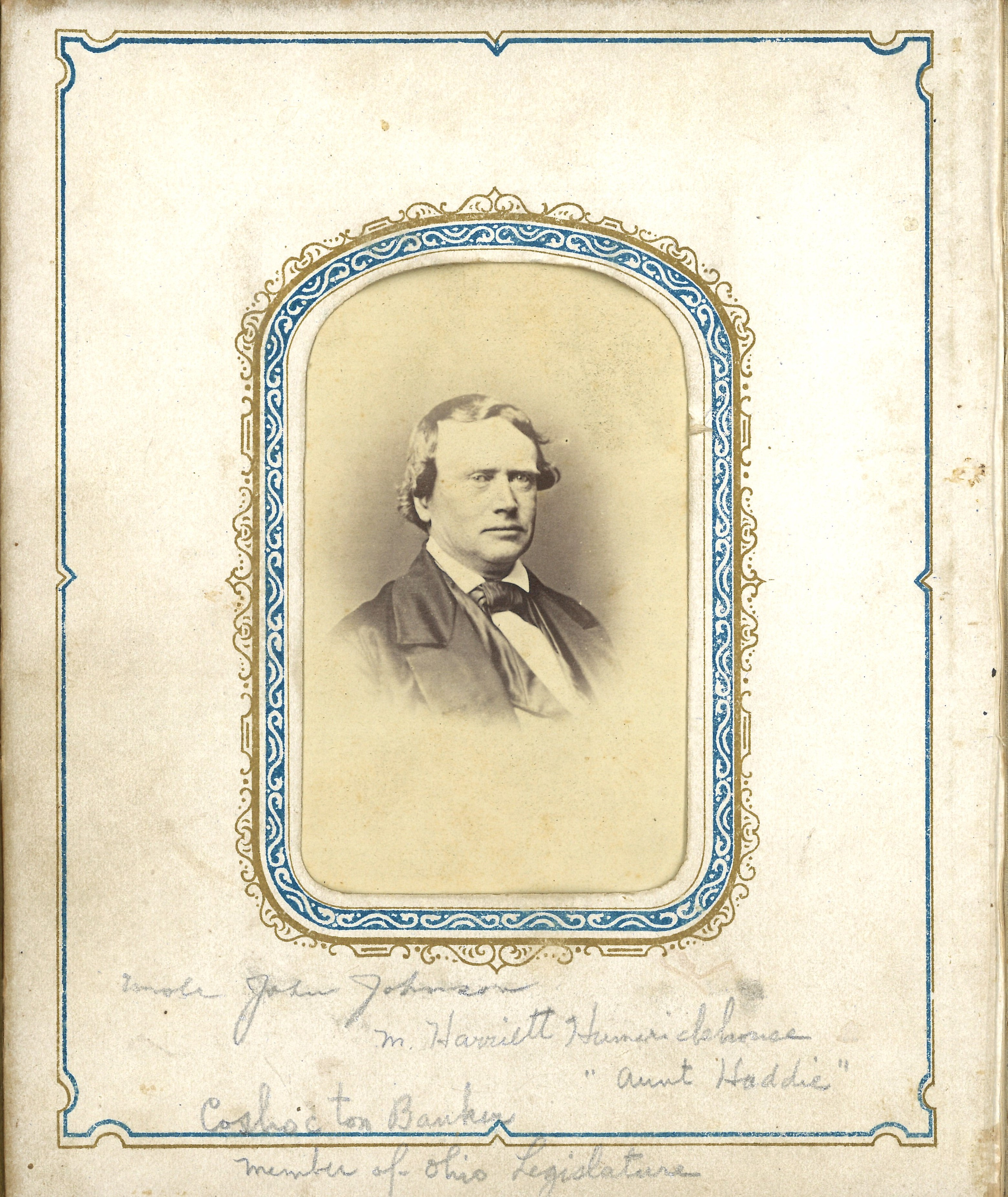
- Johnson c. 1860–1870

Member of the U.S. House of Representatives from Ohio's 16th district
- In office March 4, 1851 – March 3, 1853
- Preceded by: Moses Hoagland
- Succeeded by: Edward Ball

Member of the Ohio Senate from Coshocton County & other counties
- In office December 5, 1842 - December 1, 1844
- Preceded by: Byram Leonard
- Succeeded by: Jacob B. Koch

Personal details
- Born: c. 1805 near Dungannon, County Tyrone, Ireland
- Died: February 5, 1867 (aged 61–62) Coshocton, Ohio, U.S.
- Resting place: Oakbridge Cemetery
- Party: Democratic
- Spouse: Harriet Humrickhouse

John Johnson (c. 1805 – February 5, 1867) was a Democratic U.S. Representative from Ohio for one term from 1851 to 1853.

== Biography ==
John Johnson was born near Dungannon in County Tyrone, Ireland. He came to the United States in 1816, and to Coshocton, Ohio in 1820. He learned the tanner's trade from his step-father, James Renfrew. He was a member of the merchandising and banking firm, W. K. Johnson & Co. He entered politics in 1843, serving in the Ohio Senate, then later as a delegate from Coshocton County to the Ohio state Constitutional Convention in 1850 and 1851. Later he served as a U.S. Representative for Ohio's 16th District from 1851 to 1853.

=== Family life ===
Johnson was a member of the Presbyterian church. He was married to Harriet Humrickhouse, and had no children.

=== Death ===
He is buried at Oakbridge Cemetery in Coshocton, Ohio.

Ohio Senate
Preceded by Byram Leonard	Senator from Coshocton & other counties December 5, 1842-December 1, 1844	Succeeded by Jacob B. Koch
U.S. House of Representatives
Preceded by Moses Hoagland	United States Representative from Ohio's 16th congressional district March 4, 1851–March 3, 1853	Succeeded by Edward Ball
