= Richard Reichel =

American politician

Richard G. Reichel
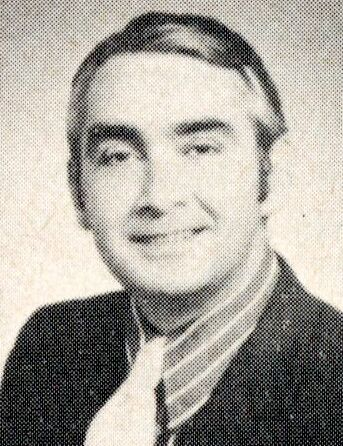

Member of the Ohio Senate from the 29th district
- In office January 3, 1973-December 31, 1974
- Preceded by: Ralph Regula
- Succeeded by: Robert D. Freeman

Member of the Ohio House of Representatives from the 92nd district
- In office January 3, 1967-December 31, 1972
- Preceded by: None (First)
- Succeeded by: Dick Maier

Personal details
- Born: 1930 (age 95–96)
- Party: Republican

Richard Reichel is an Ohio politician in the 1960s through the 1970s. Reichel was appointed in 1973 to serve as the Senator from the 29th District after Ralph Regula won a seat in the United States House of Representatives. He served from 1973 to 1974, when he and was succeeded by

He was selected to the Massillon Washington High School Honor Role of Distinguished Citizens in 2022.
