= Liberty, Ohio =

Unincorporated community in Ohio, U.S.

Coordinates: 39°43′12″N 84°19′30″W

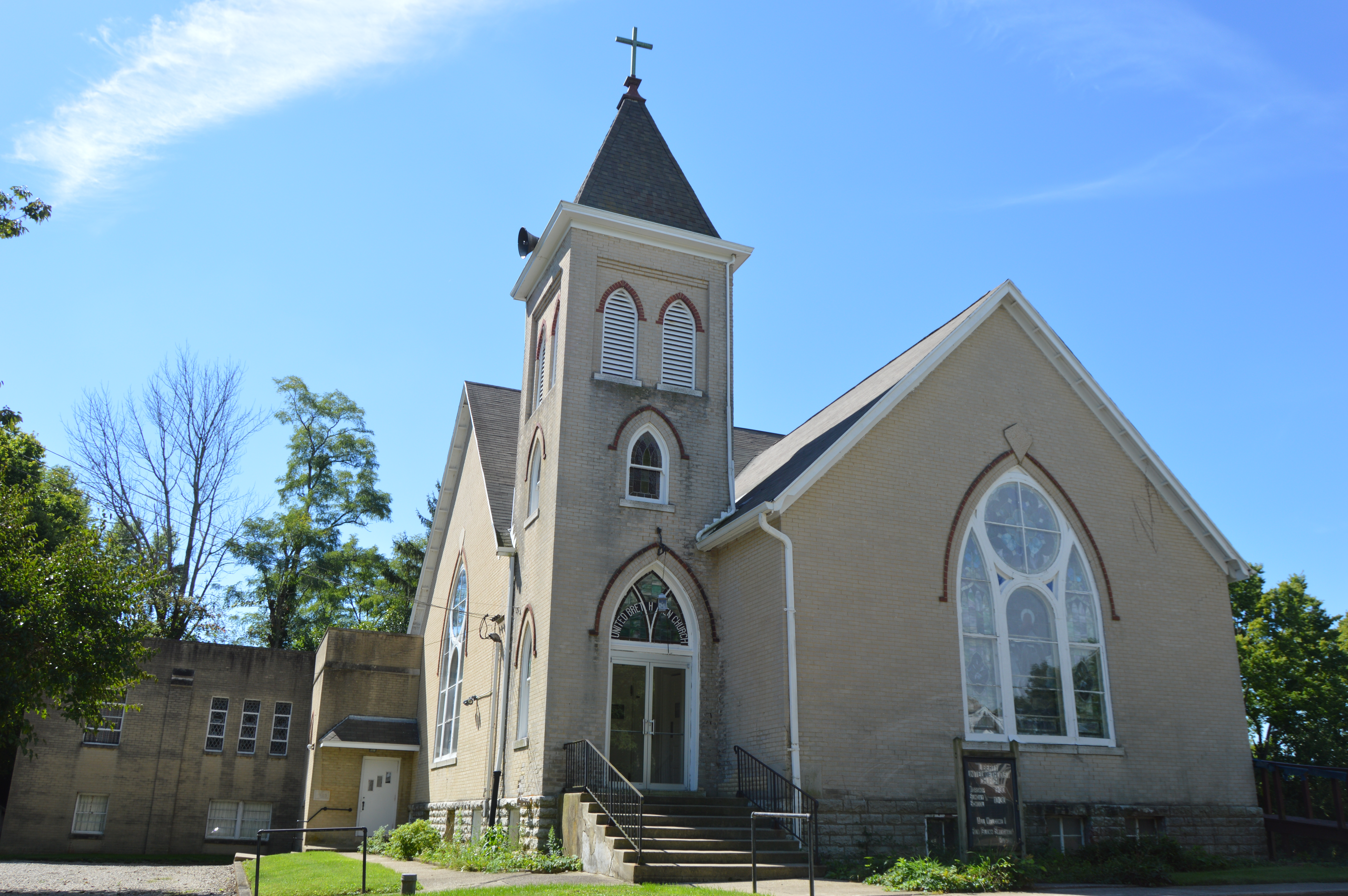
Methodist church

Liberty is an unincorporated community in Montgomery County, in the U.S. state of Ohio.

== History ==
Liberty was platted in 1815. A post office called Liberty was established in 1814, and remained in operation until 1914.
