= Kent State University at Stark =

Liberal arts college in Stark County, Ohio

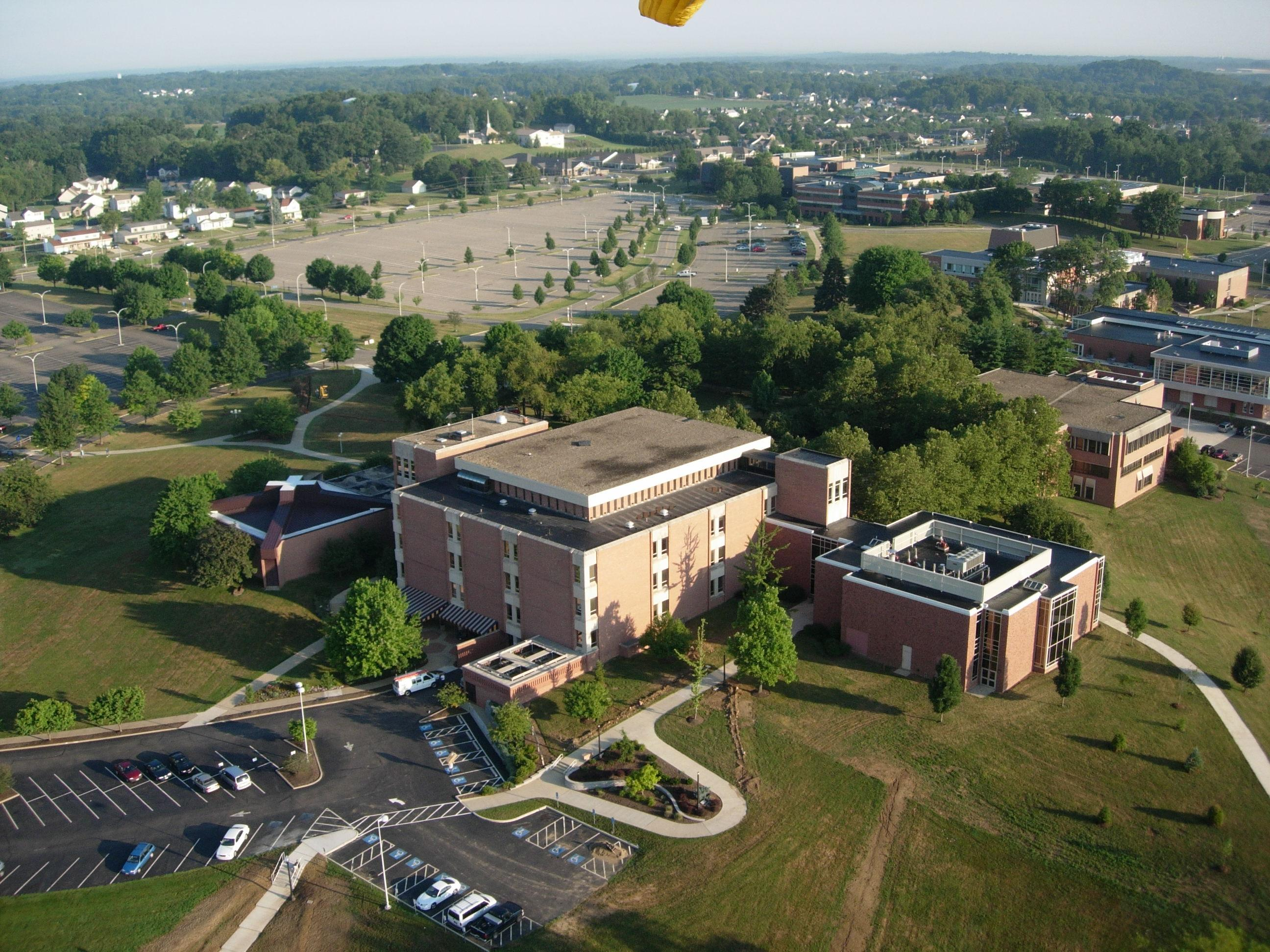
- Type: Public satellite campus
- Established: 1946; 80 years ago
- Parent institution: Kent State University
- Dean: James Hannon Interim
- Academic staff: 293
- Students: 2,905
- Location: Jackson Township, Ohio, United States; 40.8668°N 81.4374°W
- Campus: Suburban 200 acres (80.9 ha)
- Website: www.kent.edu/stark

Kent State University at Stark (Kent State University Stark or Kent State Stark) is a satellite campus of Kent State University in Jackson Township, Ohio, United States. It is accredited by the Higher Learning Commission.

== History ==
Although no facilities had been constructed for the Kent State Normal School in Kent, Ohio, in 1912 Kent's first president, John McGilvery, established extension centers, including one in the Canton area that would serve the area for several decades. In 1965, the Ohio State legislature authorized a permanent campus, and appropriated over $2 million for construction. A citizens' site selection and financial support committee, selected an accessible location near the newly completed Interstate 77 in Jackson Township in March 1965. Most of the land was owned by Leo A. Frank and John Wyles, who had farmed it with their families for many years. Once the sale was approved, committee raised over $600,000. Groundbreaking and construction began on January 7, 1966, with the first facility, Main Hall, opening in the fall of 1967.

Expansion of the Stark Campus included seven major buildings, a pond and nature trail, The Campus Center (student center) and The University Center (Professional Education and Conference Center) which provides businesses and community partners with workforce development opportunities.

== Campus ==
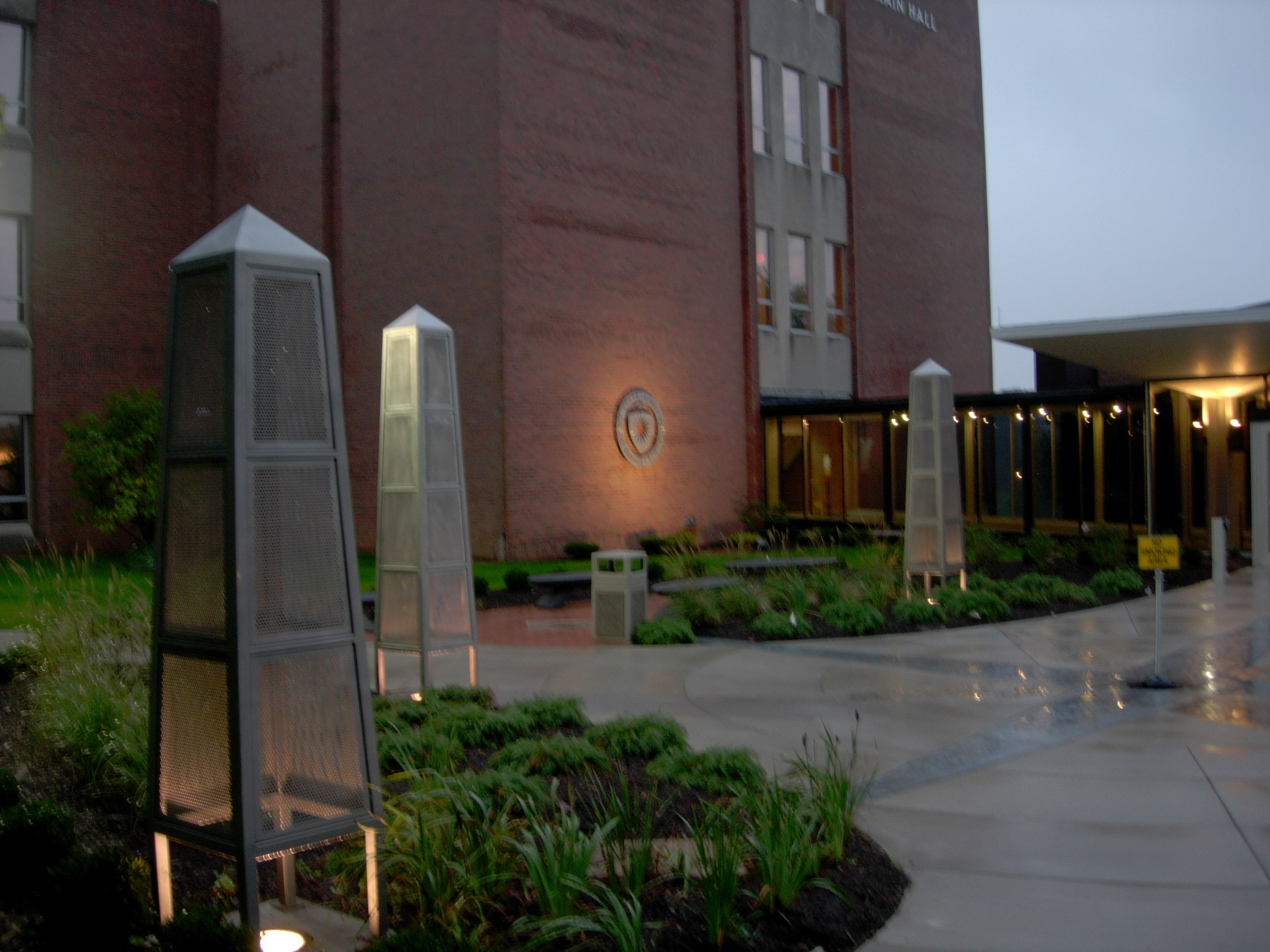
Main Hall Patio

The campus is located on 200 acres in Jackson Township and North Canton, Ohio, an area with a population over 380,000. The campus includes:

- Main Hall
- Learning Resource Center (Library)
- Fine Arts Building
- Campus Center
- Science & Nursing Building
- Recreation & Wellness Center

=== Conference Center ===
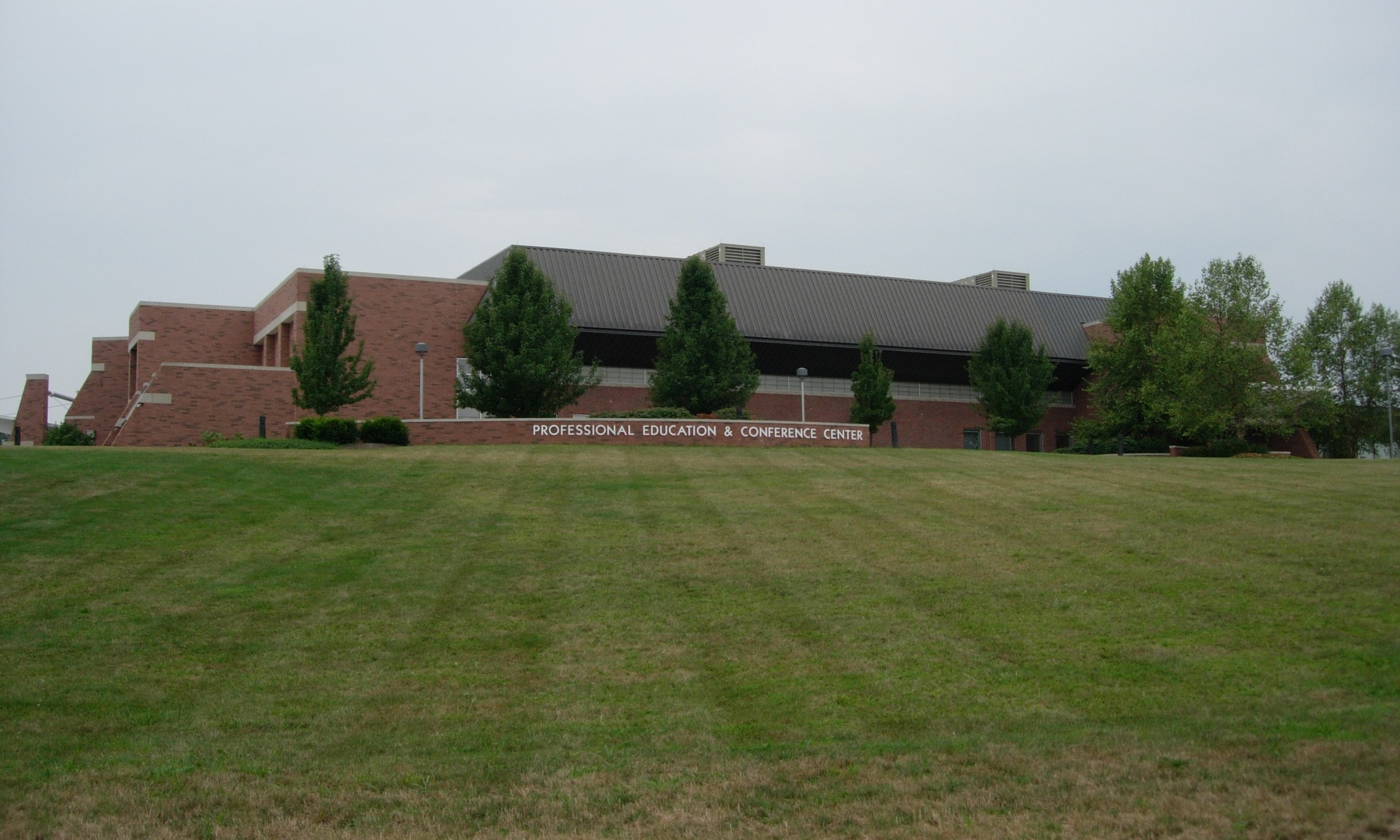
Conference Center

The Conference Center is a technologically advanced facility that serves 65,000 clients each year. It is one of only four facilities in Ohio accredited by IACC. The Conference Center provides business and community partners with meeting, training and conference rooms, a full-service dining room and the Timken Great Hall that can seat 600 guests.

=== The Corporate University ===
Since 1990, The Corporate University at Kent State Stark has offered professional development courses, customized employee training, organization development consulting, research and assessment projects and business counseling and training to over 5,000 employees annually.

The federally funded Small Business Development Center (SBDC) and Senior Core of Retired Executives (SCORE) programs provide free or low cost counseling to an additional 700 small businesses annually. In 2006 the Kent State Stark SBDC created or retained 1,800 Stark County jobs with an annual payroll of $70 million and an economic impact of $218 million.

=== Kent State Canton ===
To accommodate the postwar surge of students utilizing the new G.I. Bill, in 1946 Kent State created the Canton Division, known as Kent State University Canton (KSUC), in Canton McKinley High School on Market Street. KSUC grew rapidly, with a student newspaper, a small student union in a nearby house, a band, chorus and radio station. Kent State Canton closed in Spring 1950 when Ohio cut funding. Community members campaigned to establish a municipal university, but a levy to finance that plan failed in February 1950.

Kent State continued to provide extension programs, mostly in business and teacher education. The demand for elementary teachers in the 1950s inspired the "Cadet" program, placing teachers in the classroom faster than typical four-year programs. As the extension program grew to 400 students and became an Academic Center, it moved to Timken High School in 1959.

== Organization and administration ==
Part of the University System of Ohio, Kent State University at Stark has a local advisory board representing business, industry, education, arts and elected officials. Board members are elected for renewable three-year terms and confirmed by the Kent Board of Trustees and led by a chair and vice-chair.

== Academics ==
Kent State Stark offers baccalaureate, masters, and associate degrees.

Kent State Stark serves more than 11,000 students annually: 6,400 students in academic programs and courses and over 5,000 in executive and professional education. Over 200 high school students take advantage of pre-college programs (Dual Enrollment and Post-Secondary Enrollment) each semester. Over 500 students graduate from Kent State University at Stark annually. A Fall Commencement was added in December 2008 to accommodate student growth.

== Student life ==
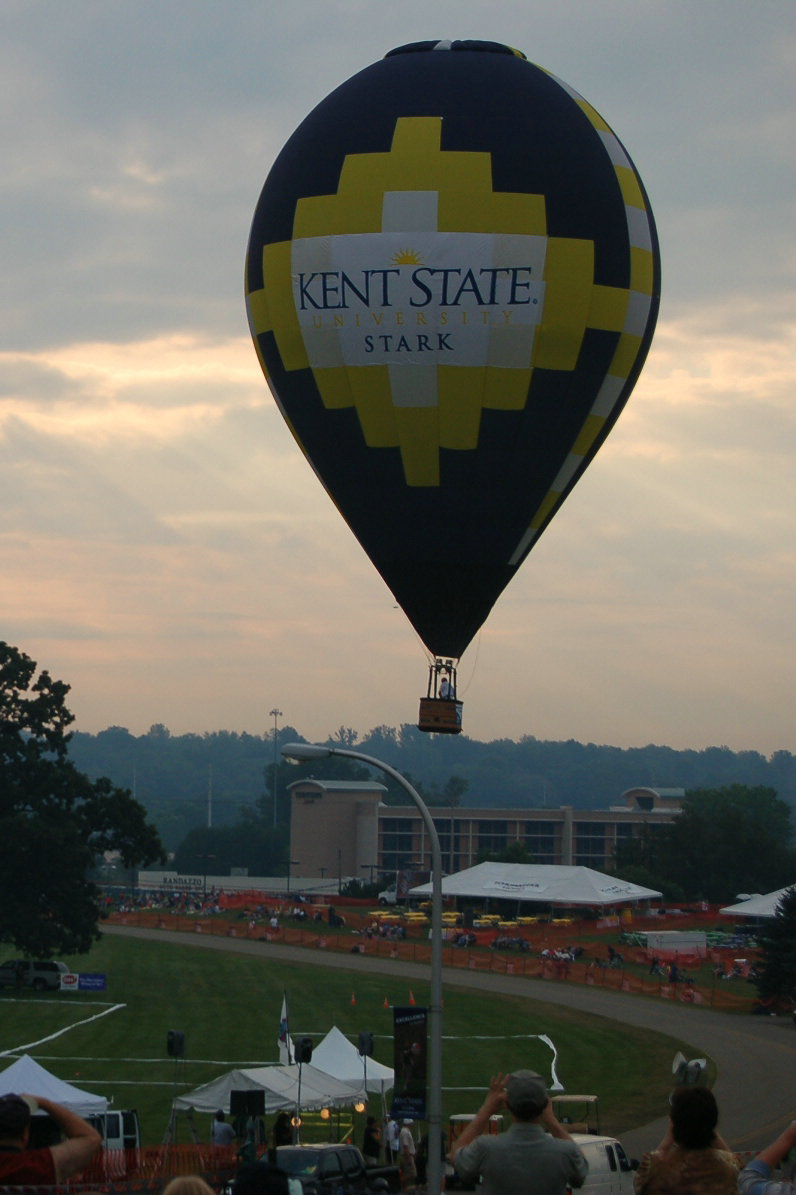
Kent State Stark balloon at the 2008 Pro Football Hall of Fame Festival Balloon Classic Invitational

Kent State Stark has an Honors Program and over 30 active student organizations ranging from academic to social and service clubs. Kent State Stark received presidential recognition for its service-learning program and has a strong Leadership Academy to develop student capabilities and talents.

The Office of Student Life celebrates the beginning of the fall semester with "Smart Start Saturday" for students and their families and FWOF (First Weeks of Fall) activities and concludes the spring semester with Kentiki celebration activities. These week-long events encourage students to meet one another and to enjoy a host of student sponsored activities.

Students enjoy club sports and the physical education facility offers open gym hours, a basketball and volleyball court, weight room, dance studio, Nautilus equipment, treadmills, stair climbers, elliptical walkers, stationary bikes and a full-service locker room for men and women. The campus sponsors several wellness initiatives each year and participates in many community service projects.

=== Senior Guest Program ===
Kent State University Stark's Senior Guest Program supports adults ages 60 and up. Designed to encourage Ohio's Senior Citizens to broaden their knowledge and skills, or revisit areas of interest that they may not have pursued as a traditional college student. Senior Guests audit and attend regular credit classes on a space-available basis. Courses taken through the Senior Guest Program are free, however, some classes have variable costs such as books or special course fees. History, art, philosophy and physical education are some of the most popular subjects. Participants usually participate in all class activities, but may elect not to take exams. Classes are not taken for credit or a grade.

=== Events ===
Canton, Ohio is home to the NFL's Pro Football Hall of Fame. Each summer eleven days of inaugural events begin at the Pro Football Hall of Fame Festival Balloon Classic Invitational and the Jackson-Belden Food Festival held on the Kent State Stark campus. The campus welcomes 150,000 guests for two and one-half days with eighty hot air balloons participating in five launches and various competitions and races.

== Notable alumni ==
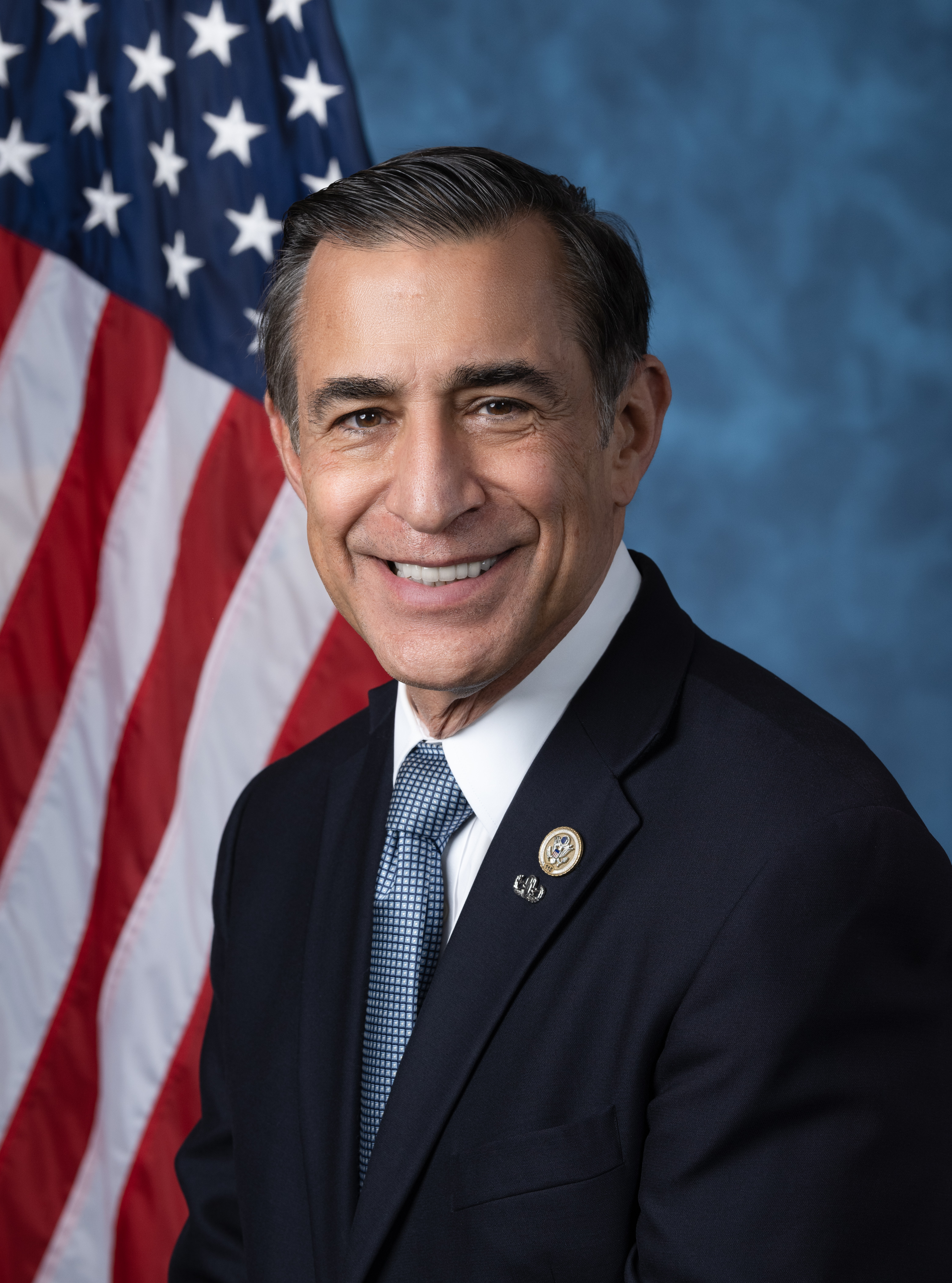
Congressman Darrell Issa

- Brannon Braga (1983–1985) – Television producer, director and screenwriter best known for his work in the Star Trek franchise
- Ronnie Harris (1967–1968) – Boxing gold medalist at the 1968 Summer Olympics, three-time National AAU Champion and bronze medal winner at the Pan American Games
- William J. Healy II (born 1962/1963), member of the Ohio House of Representatives and mayor of Canton
- Darrell Issa (1973–1976) – Member of the U.S. House of Representatives for the 48th and 49th districts of California, 2000–2019, and the 50th district, 2021–present; former CEO of Directed Electronics
