= John D. Cummins =

American politician (1791–1849)

Member of the U.S. House of Representatives from Ohio's 15th district
- In office March 4, 1845 – March 3, 1849
- Preceded by: James Mathews
- Succeeded by: Moses Hoagland

Personal details
- Born: 1791 Pennsylvania, U.S.
- Died: September 11, 1849 (aged 57–58) Milwaukee, Wisconsin, U.S.
- Party: Democratic
- Education: Jefferson College
- Profession: Politician, lawyer

John D. Cummins (1791 – September 11, 1849) was an American politician and lawyer who served in the United States House of Representatives from 1845 to 1849, representing the 15th congressional district of Ohio as a Democrat in the 29th United States Congress and the 30th United States Congress.

== Early life and education ==
Cummins was born in Pennsylvania in 1791. He attended public schools and graduated from Jefferson College in 1834. Cummins studied law.

== Career ==
Cummins was admitted to the bar; he commenced practice in New Philadelphia, Ohio.

Cummins served as prosecuting attorney of Tuscarawas County from 1836 to 1841.

Cummins served in the United States House of Representatives from 1845 to 1849, representing the 15th congressional district of Ohio as a Democrat in the 29th United States Congress and the 30th United States Congress. His tenure began on March 4, 1845, and concluded on March 3, 1849.

== Death ==
Cummins died in Milwaukee, Wisconsin, on September 11, 1849, while attending a session of the circuit court.

U.S. House of Representatives
Preceded by James Mathews	Member of the U.S. House of Representatives from Ohio's 15th congressional district 1845-1849	Succeeded by Moses Hoagland
