= Ralph Regula =

American politician (1924–2017)

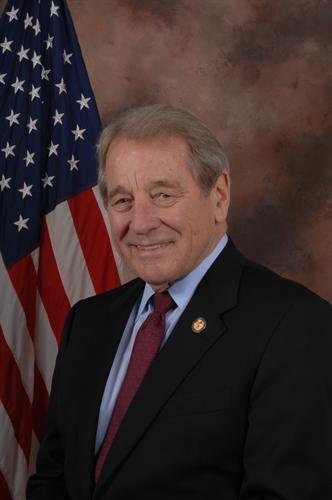

Member of the U.S. House of Representatives from Ohio's 16th district
- In office January 3, 1973 – January 3, 2009
- Preceded by: Frank Bow
- Succeeded by: John Boccieri

Member of the Ohio Senate from the 29th district
- In office January 3, 1967 – January 3, 1973
- Preceded by: Constituency established
- Succeeded by: Richard Reichel

Personal details
- Born: Ralph Straus Regula; December 3, 1924 Beach City, Ohio, U.S.
- Died: July 19, 2017 (aged 92) Bethlehem Township, Ohio, U.S.
- Party: Republican
- Spouse: Mary Rogusky
- Education: University of Mount Union (BA); William McKinley School of Law (LLB)

Military service
- Branch/service: United States Navy
- Years of service: 1944–1946
- Battles/wars: World War II
- Regula's voice Regula speaks on FY1991 appropriations for the Departments of Commerce, Justice, and State; Recorded June 20, 1990

Ralph Straus Regula (December 3, 1924 – July 19, 2017) was an American politician from Ohio. A member of the Republican Party, he served in the Ohio House of Representatives, the Ohio State Senate and the United States House of Representatives. He represented Ohio's 16th congressional district for 18 terms from 1973 to 2009. In the 110th Congress (2007–2009), he was the second longest serving Republican member of the House of Representatives (after Bill Young of Florida).

== Early life ==
Regula was born in Beach City, Ohio on December 3, 1924. He served in the United States Navy during World War II. After his service, he attended Mount Union College using his GI Bill. He met his wife, the former Mary Rogusky, while at Mount Union. After graduating in 1948, he became a schoolteacher while studying at the William McKinley College of Law in Canton. He was an Episcopalian.

== Career ==
He was elected to the Ohio Board of Education and served on that body from 1960 to 1964. He was elected to the Ohio House of Representatives in 1964 and served one term before winning a seat in the State Senate.

In 1972, President Richard Nixon nominated longtime 16th district Congressman Frank T. Bow as the United States Ambassador to Panama, which opened the door for Regula to run for the seat. Regula went on to win 18 terms in Congress.

Regula was ranking minority member of the House Appropriations Subcommittee for Labor, Health, Human Services and Education funding in the 110th Congress. The subcommittee's budget, the largest discretionary domestic account, was over $140 billion. Regula, a former teacher and principal, was a Congressional leader in pushing for alternative solutions in improving reading skills, developing teacher training and increasing Pell Grant funding so that poorer and middle class students can obtain two and four year degrees. He increased by millions of dollars the amount of federal money committed to research in fighting cancer, heart disease and birth defects. Regula was a member of the moderate Republican Main Street Partnership and supported stem cell research.

Regula was also a Congressional leader in alternative energy sources. He was an early champion of fuel cell technology and he has directed federal funding back to his home state, Ohio, which is recognized as a national leader in fuel cell research and development.

Beginning in 1975, Regula blocked the renaming of Mount McKinley in Alaska, named for President William McKinley, to Denali. This was, in part, because Canton, McKinley's long-time hometown and resting place, fell within the boundaries of Regula's congressional district. The name was eventually changed in 2015. Regula described the change as a "political stunt" by President Obama and called it "ridiculous" while also calling the President "a dictator."

With his seat on the appropriations committee, he was able to use federal funds to establish and protect parks and trails in his district. He earmarked $200 million for the Cuyahoga Valley National Recreation Area, now the Cuyahoga Valley National Park. In 2003, the Stark County Park District voted to rename the 25 miles of the Ohio and Erie Canal Towpath Trail within Stark County the "Congressman Ralph Regula Towpath Trail". It was announced at the dedication of a 150-foot-long tunnel section of the trail paid by a federal grant Regula arranged. "You really did catch me by surprise," Regula said. The park district honored Regula for his continued support in Congress for the Ohio & Erie National Heritage Canalway.

His wife Mary helped create the First Ladies National Historic Site. After she initially raised funds to seed the museum's collection, Ralph appropriated $1.2 million to pushed development further.

Regula retired from the House of Representatives when his term ended in January 2009. He was succeeded by John Boccieri, a Democrat from the Ohio General Assembly. After retiring from Congress, Regula joined Dawson & Associates in Washington, D.C. as an advisor on federal budget and permitting matters.

== See also ==
- List of United States representatives from Ohio

U.S. House of Representatives
Preceded by Frank T. Bow	Member of the U.S. House of Representatives from Ohio's 16th congressional district 1973–2009	Succeeded by John Boccieri
