= Robert Justice =

American politician

Robert Justice (March 15, 1809 – October 2, 1889) was an early statesman in the U.S. state of Ohio. He began his political career in 1840 after being elected to the position of county recorder of Holmes County. Following the end of his term in 1843 he was elected as auditor of that same county. He served as a state senator for Ohio representing the counties of Holmes, Wayne, Knox, and Morrow in 1866.

Robert Justice is best known for his nine consecutive terms which he served as justice of the peace in Holmes County.

== Personal life ==
Robert Justice was born in Hookstown in Beaver County, Pennsylvania on March 15, 1809. He was the son of Joseph Justice and his wife Elizabeth Catherine Ball. Elizabeth was an immigrant from County Donegal in Ireland. Shortly after his birth, Robert, his parents, and his older sister, Catherine, moved to Columbiana County, Ohio, where they lived for the rest of his childhood.

In 1833 he moved to Millersburg, Holmes County, Ohio where he began work as a schoolteacher and later served for six years as a school examiner.

On May 14, 1833, Robert married Martha Robeson the daughter of Charles Robeson. They were married in Washington Township in Holmes County. The couple had two daughters: Virginia and Elizabeth C. Virginia married Dr. William Morrison Ross a prominent member of the Millersburg community who had also served in the American Civil War as a captain. Martha died in 1866.

Virginia and her husband had five children, of whom only one survived to adulthood. Her surviving daughter married the grandson of Daniel Parkhurst Leadbetter making Robert Justice, Leadbetter, and McCormick related through marriage.

== Death ==
Robert Justice died on October 2, 1889, in Holmes County. He was survived by his two daughters and by one granddaughter. He was buried in Oak Hill Cemetery in Millersburg.

== Sources ==
- Commemorative Biographical of the Counties of Wayne and Holmes, Ohio 1889
- Dickinson, Marguerite "Obituaries Abstracted From Holmes County, Ohio Office Papers in Farmer HUB Office" (Holmes County Historical Society and Western Reserve Historical Society).
- Birth and Death Records for Holmes County 1878–1893 in Probate Court in Millersburg.
- 1870 U.S. Federal Census
- Records extracted from Oak Hill Cemetery, Millersburg, Holmes County, Ohio
- McNamara, Walter L. and Elizabeth Ross McNamara "Baby's Record of Virginia McNamara." 1902.
- Letter by David R. McNamara to his son Walter, June 8, 1904
- Will of Mary Leadbetter
- Will of Robert Justice
- Walmer, Margaret B. "100 Years at Warrington, York County, Pennsylvania Quakers." (1989 Heritage Books Inc.).
