= William J. Healy =

American politician (1939–2001)

Member of the Ohio House of Representatives from the 54th district
- In office January 3, 1975-December 31, 2000
- Preceded by: James Thorpe
- Succeeded by: Mary Cirelli

Personal details
- Born: March 4, 1939
- Died: October 21, 2001 (aged 62) Cleveland, Ohio
- Party: Democratic

William James "Bill" Healy (March 4, 1939 – October 21, 2001) was a member of the Ohio House of Representatives from 1975–2000. His district consisted of a portion of Canton, Ohio. He was succeeded by fellow Democrat Mary Cirelli.
