= Robert D. Freeman =

American politician

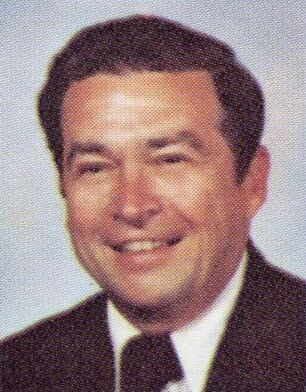

Member of the Ohio Senate from the 29th district
- In office January 3, 1975-December 31, 1978
- Preceded by: Richard Reichel
- Succeeded by: Tom Walsh

Personal details
- Born: November 20, 1921
- Died: December 17, 2001 (aged 80)
- Party: Democratic

Robert D. Freeman (November 20, 1921 – December 17, 2001) was an American politician. He was a member of the Ohio Senate from 1975 to 1978, and represented the 29th district.

Freeman was often known as "Sunshine Bob". A Democrat, he was active in Canton area politics for over three decades. He died in 2001 after being involved in an automobile accident.

Has grandchildren in Michael Freeman II, Erin Freeman and Robert Freeman aka "bobo".
