= West Lawn Cemetery =

Cemetery in Canton, Ohio

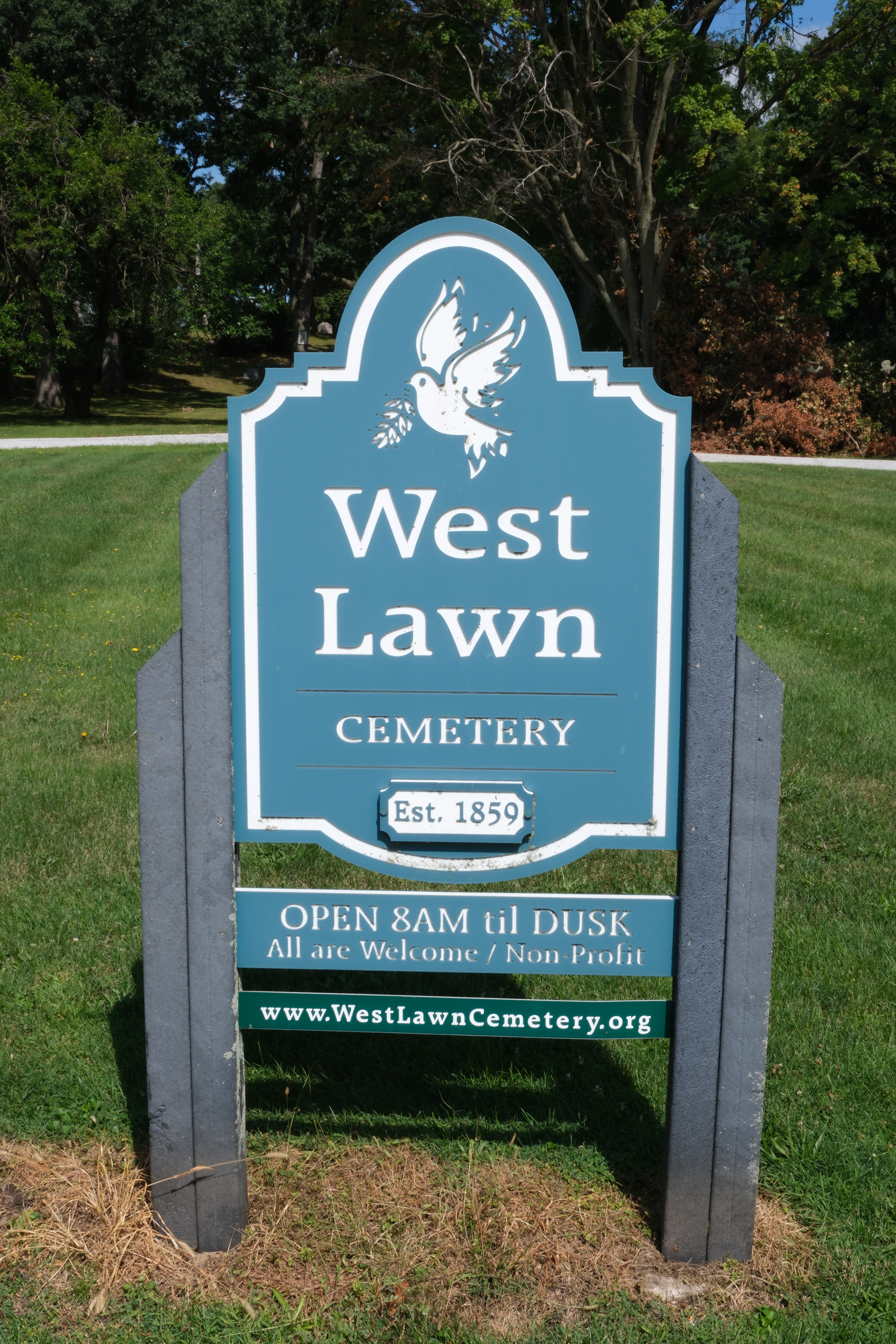
- West Lawn Cemetery sign
- Interactive map of West Lawn Cemetery

Details
- Established: 1861
- Location: Canton, Ohio
- Country: United States
- Website: www.cantoncemetery.org/cemeteries/west-lawn-cemetery/
- Find a Grave: West Lawn Cemetery

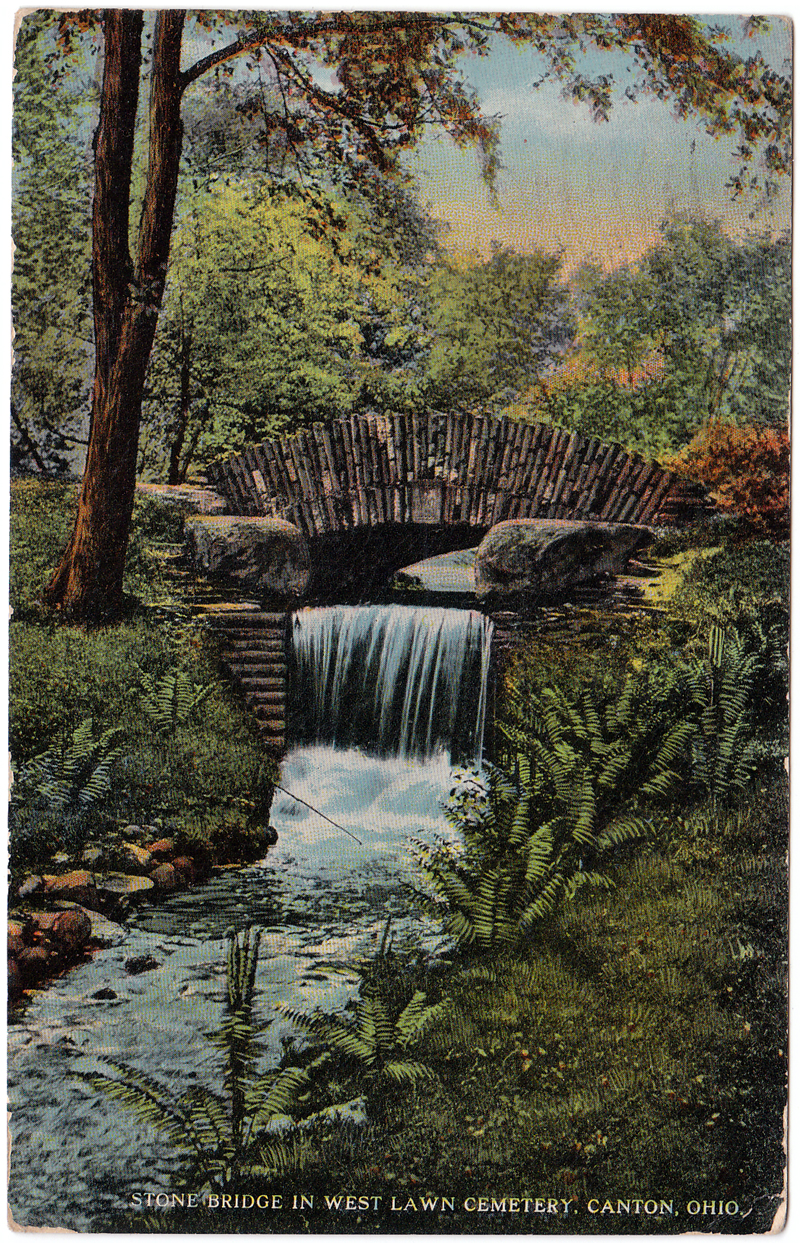
Stone Bridge in West Lawn Cemetery, Canton, Ohio (1916)

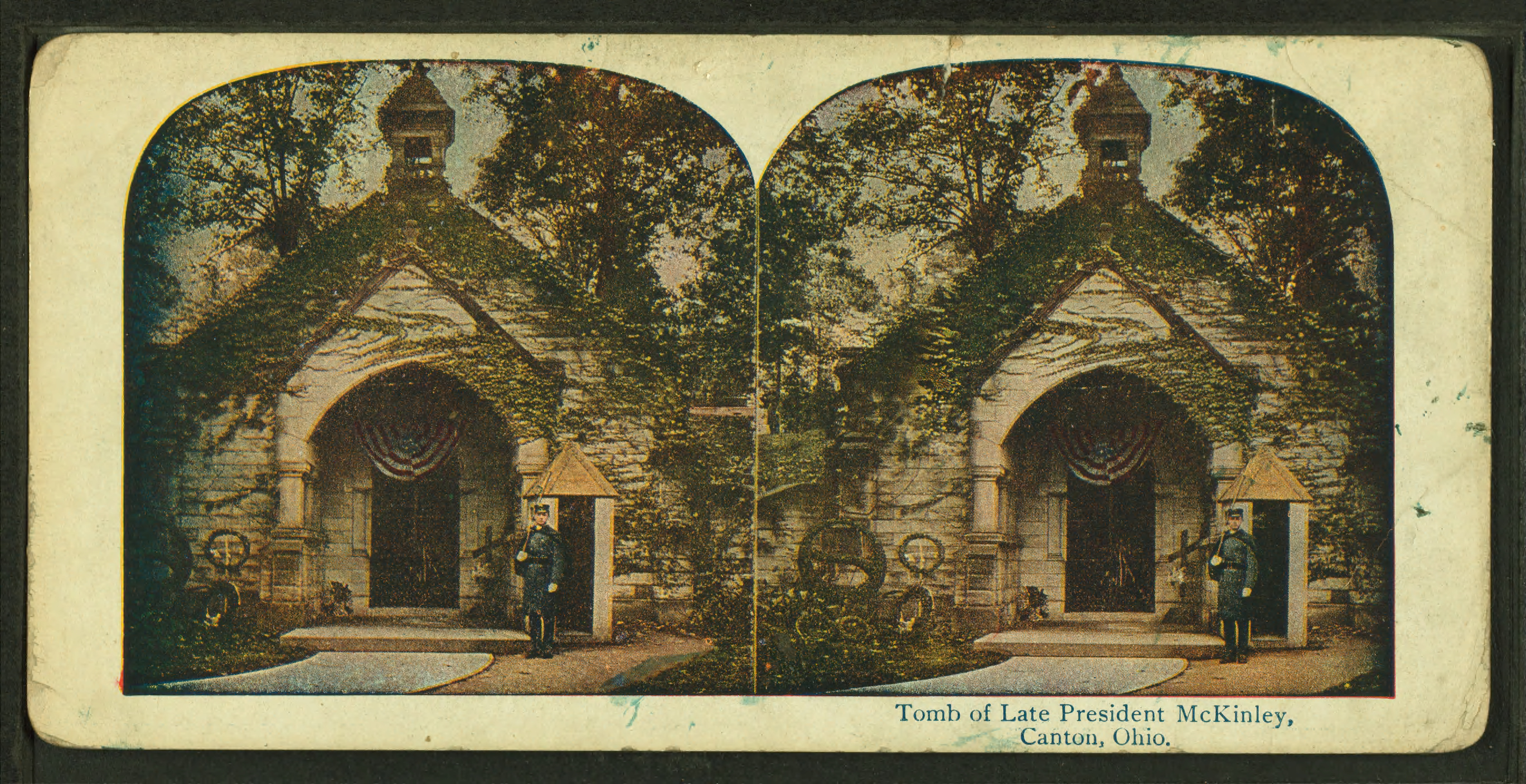
Werts Receiving Vault, where President William McKinley was interred until his memorial was completed

West Lawn Cemetery is in Canton, Ohio, US, adjacent to the McKinley National Memorial. It was the original resting place of William McKinley until his memorial was built, and has graves of other notable Cantonians.

== History ==
Bezaleel Wells, Canton's founder, set aside the Plum Street Cemetery at 6th Street SW at Plum Street (now McKinley Ave) when he laid out the town in 1805. The town grew, and the cemetery was encircled by development. On March 19, 1859, leading citizens formed the Canton Cemetery Association, pledging $50.00 each to purchase land for a graveyard. Originally called the Canton Cemetery, its name was changed to West Lawn when it was incorporated in 1861.

The first burial was January 1, 1861, and tens of thousands have occurred since. The cemetery is now 67 acres, and is still active. The Canton Cemetery Association, a non-sectarian non-profit organization with a volunteer board of trustees and paid staff, manages and owns West Lawn, as well as North Lawn in another part of the city.

The cemetery is between 4th and 12th St. NW and between the McKinley Memorial and Interstate 77. 40°48′31″N 81°23′48″W

== Notable interments ==
See also Category:Burials at West Lawn Cemetery.

The cemetery contains one Commonwealth war grave, of a Canadian Army soldier of World War I.

== See also ==
- List of burial places of justices of the Supreme Court of the United States
