= Brader =

Brader is a surname. Notable people with the surname include:

- Alec Brader (1942–2024), English footballer
- Betty Brader (1923–1986), American fashion illustrator
- Ferdinand A. Brader (1833–1901), American artist
- Maria Josefa Karolina Brader (1860–1943), Swiss Roman Catholic religious sister
