= Rachel Frease-Green =

American soprano

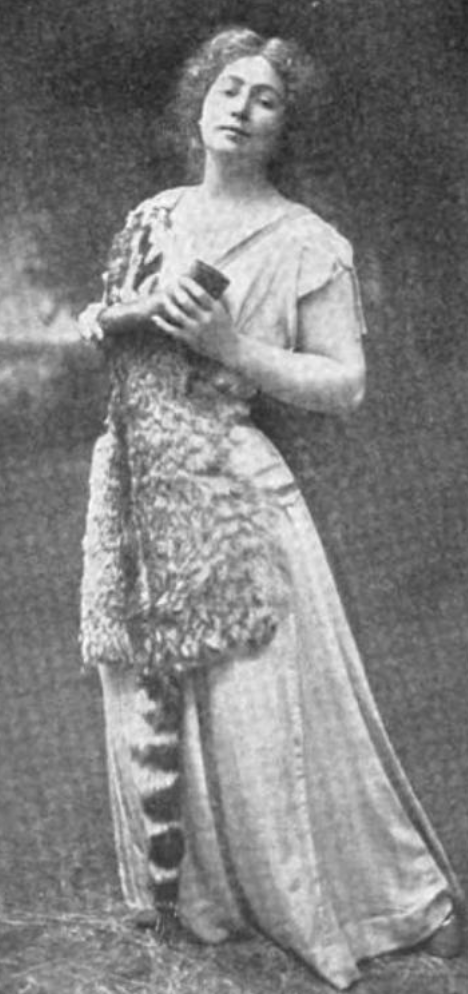
- Rachel Frease-Green, from a 1910 publication
- Born: Rachel Belden Frease; July 27, 1875; Canton, Ohio, U.S.
- Died: November 11, 1953 (aged 78); Cleveland, Ohio, U.S.
- Occupation: Soprano
- Relatives: Harry March (brother-in-law)

Rachel Belden Frease-Green (July 27, 1875 – November 11, 1953) was an American soprano based in Ohio. She sang at the funerals of president William McKinley and his widow, in 1901 and 1907 respectively, and in operas and concerts in the 1910s and 1920s.

== Early life and education ==
Frease was born in Canton, Ohio, the daughter of Joseph Frease and Sara Hayes Belden Frease. Her father was a judge and a colleague of William McKinley; she sang at McKinley's funeral in 1901. She also sang at Ida Saxton McKinley's funeral in 1907. Her sister Edith married theatrical producer and football pioneer Harry March.

Frease trained for a career in opera in Europe, with singers Jean de Reszke and Mathilde Marchesi.

== Career ==
In 1909, Frease-Green made her London debut at the Royal Opera House, as Sieglinde in The Valkyrie. "She looked like a figure from Burne-Jones, and showed the training and instincts of a true actress," according to a review in The Times. She sang with the Volksoper in Berlin for three seasons. She joined the Chicago Grand Opera in 1911. In 1913 she sang with the Boston Opera Company, appearing as Leonora in Il Trovatore. In 1921 she was a soloist with the New York Philharmonic at a concert in Lexington, Kentucky. In 1926, she was president of the Canton Civic Light Opera in Ohio.

== Personal life ==
Frease married Walter Green in 1901; he died in 1906. She died in 1953, at the age of 78, in Cleveland, Ohio.
