= Frederic Eugene Ives =

American inventor

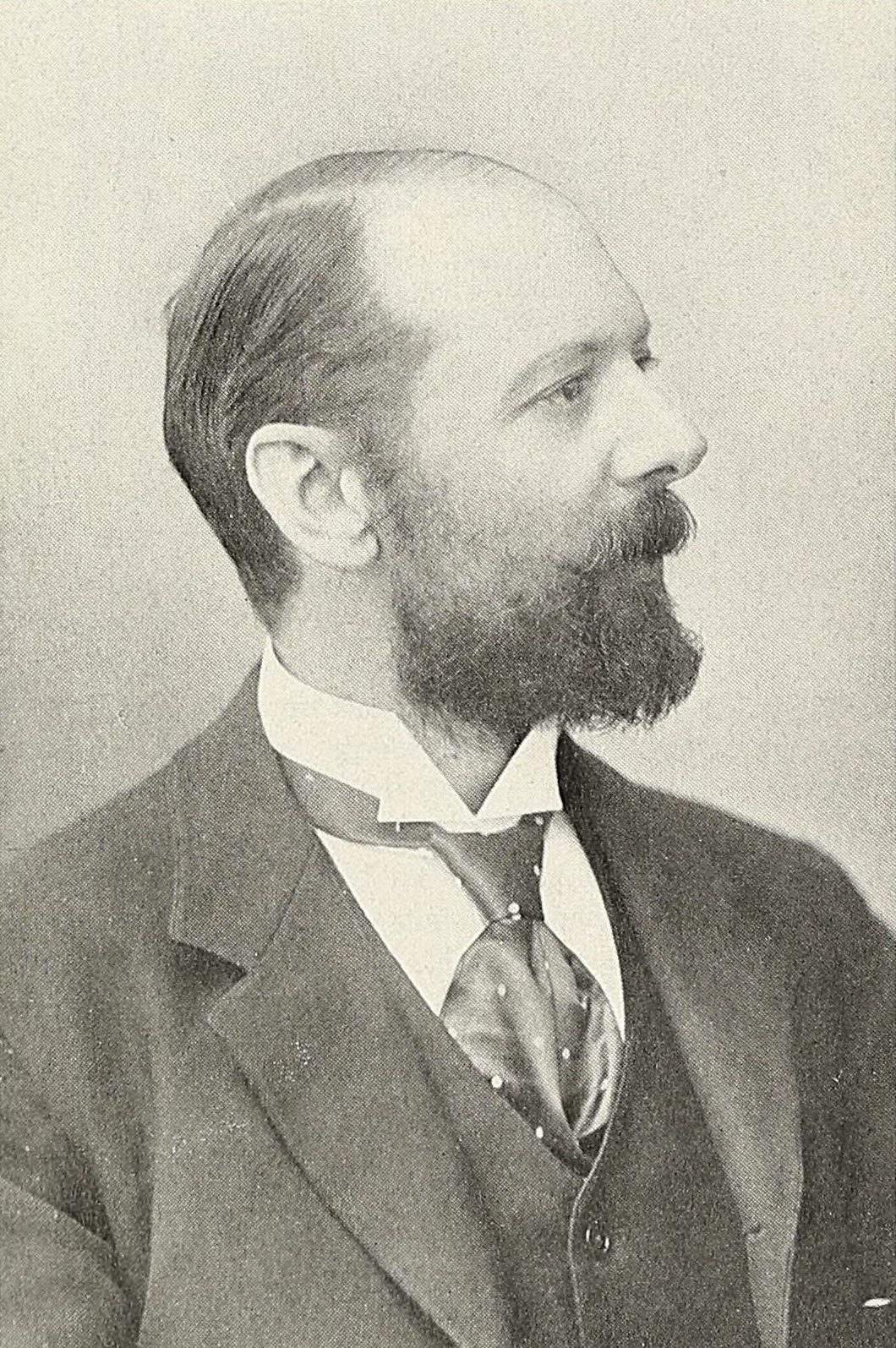
- Portrait of Ives from a 1902 edition of The Inland Printer
- Born: February 17, 1856; Litchfield, Connecticut, United States
- Died: May 27, 1937 (aged 81)
- Spouse: Mary Olmstead
- Children: Herbert E. Ives

Signature
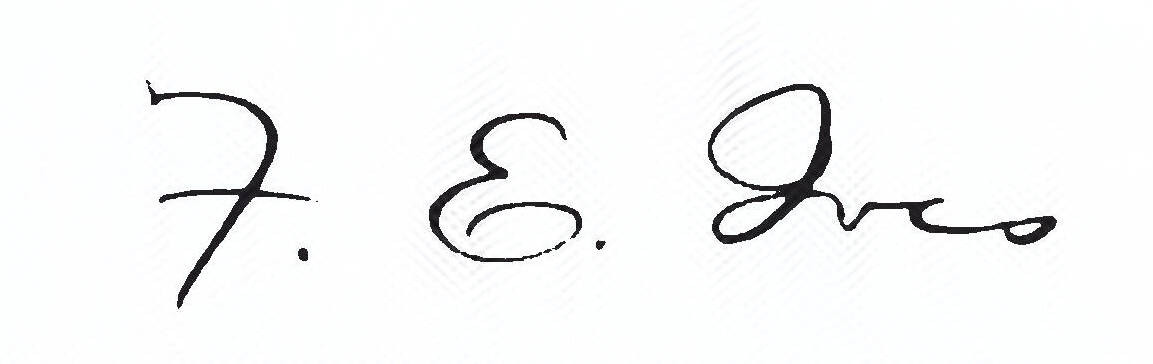

Frederic Eugene Ives (February 17, 1856 – May 27, 1937) was a U.S. inventor who was born in Litchfield, Connecticut. In 1874–78 he had charge of the photographic laboratory at Cornell University. He moved to Philadelphia, Pennsylvania, where in 1885 he was one of the founding members of the Photographic Society of Philadelphia. He was awarded the Franklin Institute's Elliott Cresson Medal in 1893, the Edward Longstreth Medal in 1903, and the John Scott Medal in 1887, 1890, 1904 and 1906. He was elected to the American Philosophical Society in 1922. His son Herbert E. Ives was a pioneer of television and telephotography, including color facsimile.

== Color photography ==
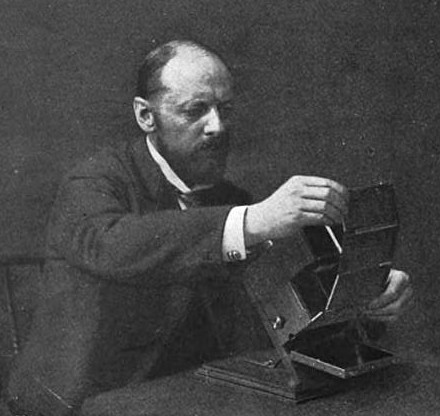
Ives inserting a Kromogram into a Junior Kromskop, circa 1899

Ives was a pioneer in the field of color photography. He first demonstrated a system of natural color photography at the 1885 Novelties Exposition of the Franklin Institute in Philadelphia. His fully developed Kromskop (long-vowel marks over both "o"s and pronounced "chrome-scope") color photography system was commercially available in England by late 1897 and in the US about a year later.

Three separate black-and-white photographs of the subject were taken through carefully adjusted red, green and blue filters, a method of photographically recording color first suggested by James Clerk Maxwell in 1855 and imperfectly demonstrated in 1861, but subsequently forgotten and independently reinvented by others.

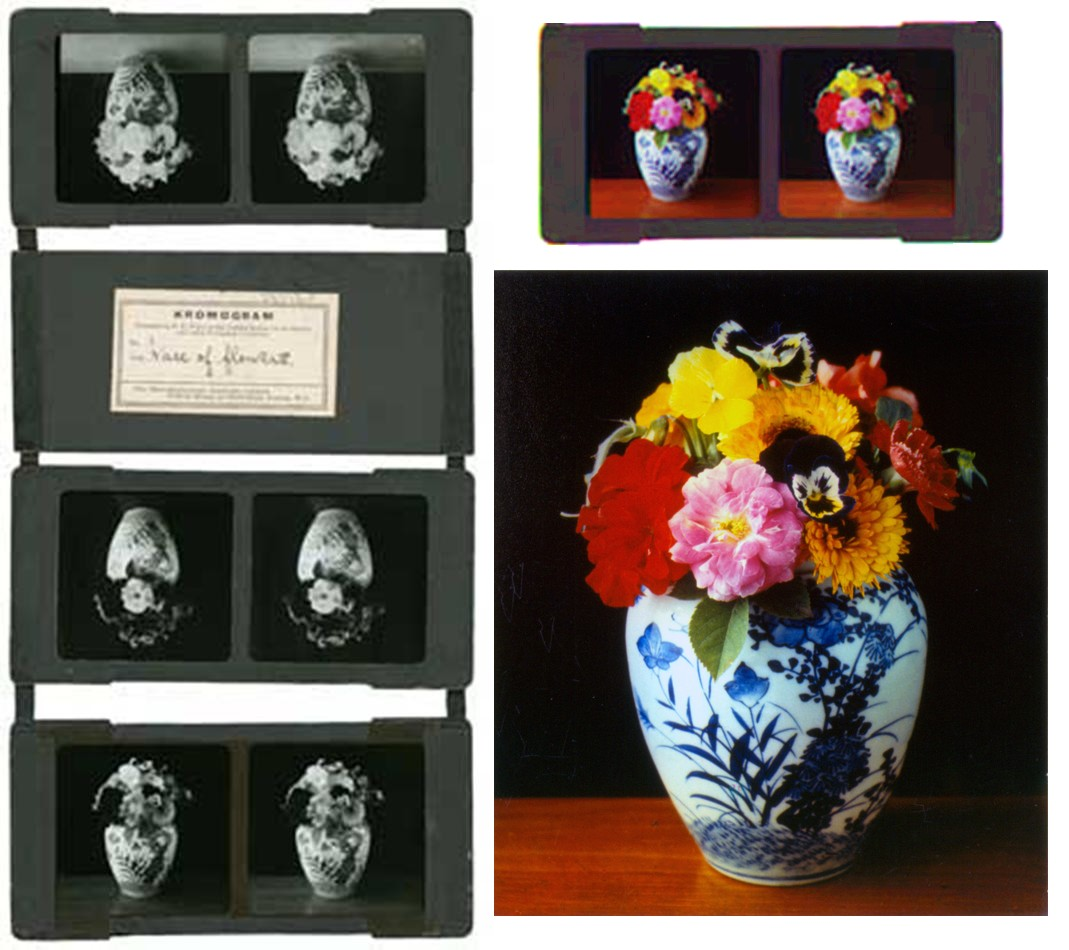
An Ives Kromogram issued in 1897

Transparent positives of the three images were viewed in Ives' Kromskop (a device known generically as a chromoscope or photochromoscope), which used red, green and blue filters and transparent reflectors to visually combine them into one full-color image. Both monocular and stereoscopic Kromskop viewers were made. Prepared sets of images, called Kromograms, were sold for viewing in them. Alternatively, a Kromskop "triple lantern" projector could be used to illuminate each image with light of the correct color and exactly superimpose them on a projection screen.

Special cameras and camera attachments were sold to prospective "Kromskopists" who wanted to create their own Kromograms.

The quality of the color was highly praised but the system was not a commercial success. It was discontinued shortly after the 1907 introduction of the Autochrome process, which was simple to use and required no special equipment.

In 2009, several Kromogram views of San Francisco made by Ives six months after the 1906 earthquake and fire were discovered while cataloging a collection of Kromograms at the National Museum of American History. They are believed to be the only existing images showing the aftermath of that disaster in natural color (i.e., with color recorded and reproduced photographically rather than added in by hand), as well as the earliest extant natural color photographs of San Francisco.

== Stereoscopic photography ==
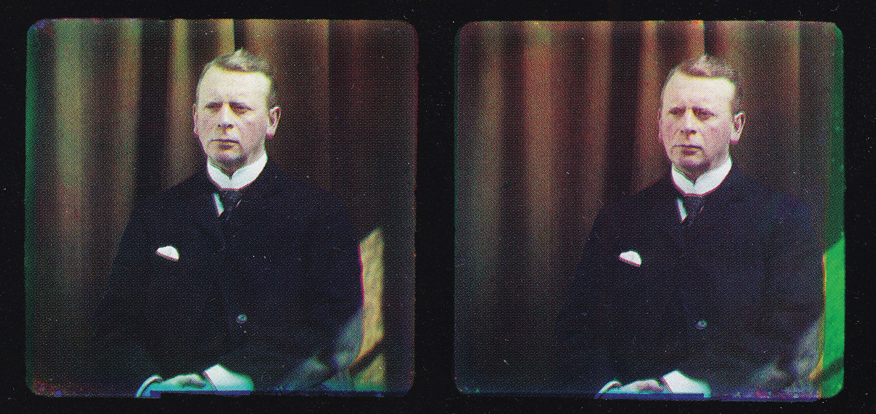
Kromogram stereo portrait of Mr. Robinson, taken by Ives for William James Herschel, c. 1898.

In 1903 Ives patented the parallax stereogram, the first "no glasses" autostereoscopic 3D display technology. A compound image consisting of fine interlaced vertical slivers of a stereoscopic pair of images was seen in 3D when viewed through a slightly separated fine grid of correctly spaced alternating opaque and transparent vertical lines, now known as a parallax barrier. The grid allowed each eye to see only the slivers of the image intended for it.

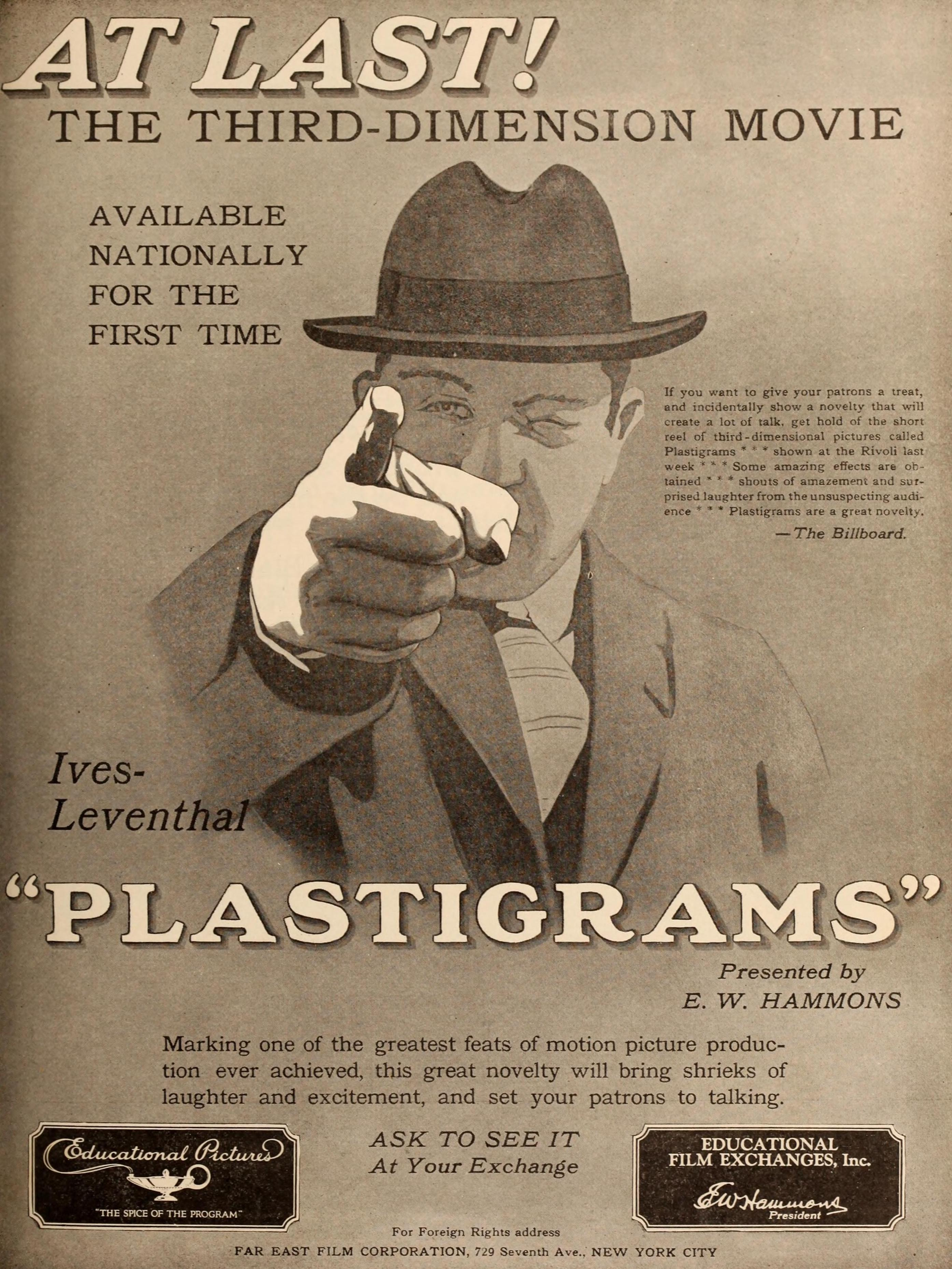
Advertisement for plastigrams, 1924

Ives first exhibited such an image in 1901, at which time he stated that the basic concept had occurred to him about sixteen years earlier while working with line screens for the halftone process. In 1904, Auguste Berthier came forward to claim due credit for the first publication of this concept. He had included it near the end of an 1896 article about large-format stereoscopic images. Berthier had also created an extremely coarse and nonfunctional interlaced image for purposes of illustration, but he never reduced the idea to practice or attempted to patent it.

Eventually, several other inventors, including Ives' son Herbert, substituted an array of narrow cylindrical lenses for the simple parallax barrier and incorporated more than two viewpoints, creating lenticular parallax panoramagram 3D images of the type most familiar from 3D postcards, trading cards and similar novelties, often confused with holograms. The original parallax barrier method is currently (2017) employed in several no-glasses 3D video displays.

Ives also patented the use of parallax barriers for displaying changeable images.

As early as 1900, Ives was tinkering with stereoscopic motion pictures. By 1922, he and fellow inventor Jacob Leventhal were producing a popular series of anaglyph 3D novelty shorts called Plastigrams. The first one was released by Educational Pictures in December 1922, and the later ones by Pathé Films.

== Halftone process ==
Halftone processes allow photographs, complete with their "half-tone" intermediate shades of gray or color, to be reproduced in ink on paper by means of a printing press, like text. Prior to such processes, images were printed in books and periodicals by means of hand-engraved metal plates or wood blocks, or from drawings made on lithographic stones. Half-tone effects were obtained by engraving closely spaced parallel or hatched lines, by stippling, or by exploiting the granular texture inherent in the stone lithography process.

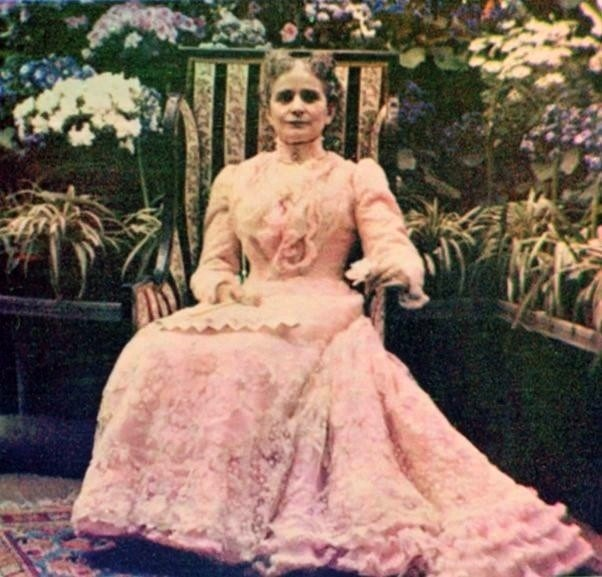
Kromogram of Ida Saxton McKinley, first lady of the United States from 1897 to 1901. Taken by Frederic E. Ives and William Nicholson Jennings.

Ives is sometimes referred to as "the" inventor of "the" halftone process, but this is incorrect and Ives never made such a claim for himself. There was not one halftone process, but a considerable number of them, the earliest dating nearly as far back as the introduction of practical photography in 1839. They varied widely in their degree of practicality and the quality of their results. The first attempts involved directly etching the unique images formed on metallic Daguerreotype plates. Although pleasing results were obtained, etching the plates required great skill and care, the images could not be printed along with ordinary type, and the delicate plates wore out after a very small number of impressions, making such processes useless for publishing on a commercial scale. More practical processes started appearing in the 1860s, but high cost, special printing requirements or low image quality variously kept these early processes from coming into widespread use.

Ives turned his attention to halftone processes in the late 1870s. The objectives were to more or less automatically convert the intermediate tones of a photographic image into small lines or dots of stark black and white; to do this better, or at least more efficiently, than was possible with existing processes; and to create a printing block that could be combined with blocks of text in an ordinary printing press. The lines or dots, of varying widths or sizes respectively, had to be small enough to adequately blend together in the eye at a normal viewing distance, producing the illusion of various shades of gray, yet the printing plates had to be durable enough to last through a typical press run without excessive degradation. Above all, the process had to be economical enough to make its widespread commercial use practical.

Ives patented his first "Ives' process" in 1881. This early process required the creation of a photographic relief image, made by a variety of the carbon process, from which a plaster cast was made. The highest areas on the surface of the plaster corresponded with the darkest areas of the original photograph. The cast was pressed into contact with an inked rubber grid consisting of an array of tiny pyramidal elements, which caused a regular array of ink dots to be deposited on the plaster, their sizes varying according to the heights of the surface. The dot pattern was then photographed onto a metal plate coated with photoresist, which was developed and chemically etched, a process known as photoengraving and already in use for making printing plates from line drawings, handwriting and other purely black and white subject matter. Although complex, this process was simpler and more efficient than other processes then in some limited use, and in 1884 Ives asserted that it was "the first patented or published process which was introduced into truly successful commercial operation."

A few years later, Ives replaced this process with the much simpler one usually associated with his name. In the new process, an ordinary photograph was rephotographed directly onto the sensitized metal plate. A crossline screen, consisting of two glass plates finely ruled with opaque lines and sandwiched together with their lines crossing at right angles, was positioned near the surface of the metal, and a specially shaped diaphragm was used with the camera lens. Combined with the inherently stark black-and-white nature of the photoengraving process, these devices served to break up the image into a regular pattern of dots of various sizes with optimized shapes. During the 1890s, photographs reproduced by this second "Ives process" largely replaced the use of hand-engraved wood block and steel plate illustrations. It remained the standard process for photographically illustrating books, magazines and newspapers during the next eighty years. Although much more technologically sophisticated methods eventually came into use for creating the printing plates, the structure of most printed halftone images has remained virtually unchanged.

== Colorimetry ==
Ives was also an important contributor to the development of the science of colorimetry. His paper of 1915 proposed a color model in the form of a cube, with three of the vertices forming a triangle for the additive primaries, three others a triangle for their secondary colors, and the two remaining (opposite) vertices for black and white. A similar model was adopted by the International Commission on Illumination (CIE) as the basis of their color space drawn up in 1926, revised in 1931, which has been influential on all scientific color studies since then. Ives died in 1937.
