= Stationary-wave integrated Fourier-transform spectrometry =

Stationary-wave integrated Fourier-transform spectrometry (SWIFTS), or standing-wave integrated Fourier-transform spectrometry, is an analytical technique used for measuring the distribution of light across an optical spectrum. SWIFTS technology is based on a near-field Lippmann architecture. An optical signal is injected into a waveguide and ended by a mirror (true Lippman configuration). The input signal interferes with the reflected signal, creating a standing, or stationary, wave.

In a counter-propagative architecture, the two optical signals are injected at the opposite ends of the waveguide. The evanescent waves propagating within the waveguide are then sampled by optical probes. This results in an interferogram. A mathematical function known as a Lippmann transform, similar to a Fourier transform, is later used to give the spectrum of the light.

== History ==
In 1891, at the Académie des Sciences in Paris, Gabriel Lippmann presented a colour photograph of the Sun's spectrum obtained with his new photographic plate. Later, in 1894, he published an article on how his plate was able to record colour information in the depth of photographic grainless gelatin and how the same plate after processing could restore the original colour image merely through light reflection. He was thus the inventor of true interferential colour photography. He received the Nobel Prize in Physics in 1908 for this breakthrough. Unfortunately, this principle was too complex to use. The method was abandoned a few years after its discovery.

One aspect of the Lippmann concept that was ignored at that time relates to spectroscopic applications. Early in 1933, Herbert E. Ives proposed to use a photoelectric device to probe stationary waves to make spectrometric measurements. In 1995, P. Connes proposed to use the emerging new technology of detectors for three-dimensional Lippmann-based spectrometry. Following this, a first realization of a very compact spectrometer based on a microoptoelectromechanical system (MOEMS) was reported by Knipp et al. in 2005, but it had a very limited spectral resolution. In 2004, two French researchers, Etienne Le Coarer from Joseph Fourier University and Pierre Benech from INP Grenoble, coupled sensing elements to the evanescent part of standing waves within a single-mode waveguide. In 2007, those two researchers reported a near-field method to probe the interferogram within a waveguide. The first SWIFTS-based spectrometers appeared in 2011 based on a SWIFTS linear configuration.

== Technology principle ==
The technology works by probing an optical standing wave, or the sum of the standing waves in the case of polychromatic light, created by a light to be analyzed. In a SWIFTS linear configuration (true Lippman configuration), the stationary wave is created by a single-mode waveguide ended by a fixed mirror. The stationary wave is regularly sampled on one side of a waveguide using nano-scattering dots. These dots are located in the evanescent field. These nanodots are characterized by an optical index difference with the medium in which the evanescent field is located. The light is then scattered around an axis perpendicular to the waveguide. For each dot, this scattered light is detected by a pixel aligned with this axis. The intensity detected is therefore proportional to the intensity inside the waveguide at the exact location of the dot. This results in a linear image of the interferogram. No moving parts are used. A mathematical function known as a Lippmann transform, similar to a Fourier transform, is then applied to this linear image and gives the spectrum of the light.

The interferogram is truncated. Only the frequencies corresponding to the zero optical path difference at the mirror, up to the farthest dots are sampled. Higher frequencies are rejected. This interferogram’s truncation determines the spectral resolution. The interferogram is undersampled. A consequence of this under-sampling is a limitation of the wavelength bandwidth to which the mathematical function is applied.

SWIFTS technology displays the Fellgett's advantage, which is derived from the fact that an interferometer measures wavelengths simultaneously with the same elements of the detector, whereas a dispersive spectrometer measures them successively. Fellgett's advantage also states that when collecting a spectrum whose measurement noise is dominated by detector noise, a multiplex spectrometer such as a Fourier-transform spectrometer will produce a relative improvement in the signal-to-noise ratio, with respect to an equivalent scanning monochromator, that is approximately equal to the square root of the number of sample points comprising the spectrum. The Connes advantage states that the wavenumber scale of an interferometer, derived from a helium–neon laser, is more accurate and boasts better long-term stability than the calibration of dispersive instruments.
