= William McKinley Presidential Library and Museum =

Presidential library and museum in Canton, Ohio

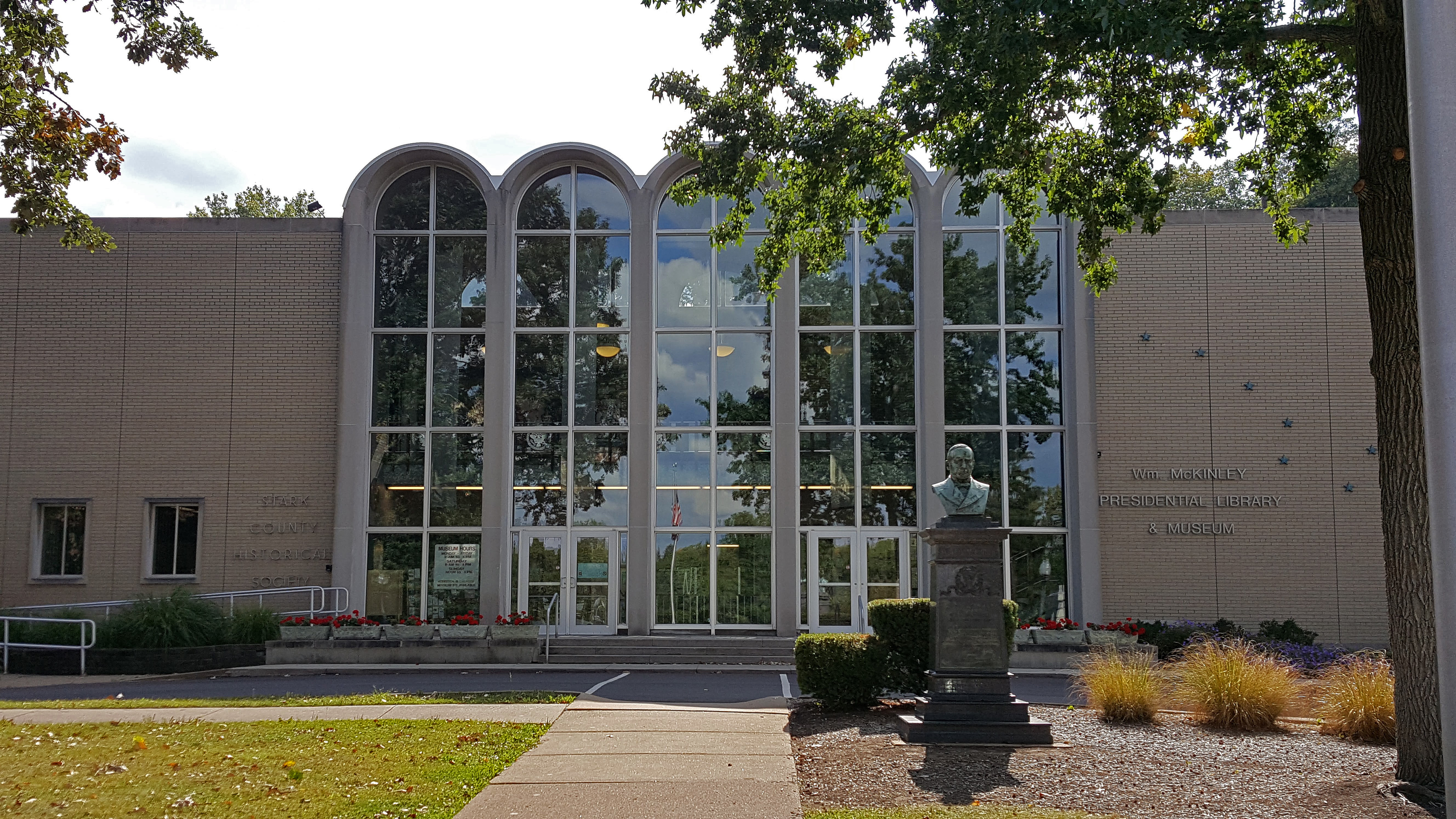
- William McKinley Presidential Library and Museum in 2017

- Location within Ohio Location within the United States

General information
- Location: Canton, Ohio, United States
- Coordinates: 40°48′23.08″N 81°23′33.06″W
- Named for: William McKinley
- Operator: Stark County Historical Society

Website
- mckinleymuseum.org

The William McKinley Presidential Library and Museum is the presidential library of 25th U.S. president William McKinley. The library, which is located at the foot of the McKinley National Memorial, is owned and operated by the Stark County Historical Society, and located in Canton, Ohio, where McKinley built his career as lawyer, prosecuting attorney, congressman, governor and president.

The museum contains the largest collection of McKinley artifacts in the world and chronicles the life and career of the 25th president, from his birth to his death at the hands of an assassin. Another exhibit also explores the construction of the Memorial and the unfortunate fate of the McKinleys' Canton home, destroyed by fire in 1937.

As for the Museum itself it boasts a science center with some wildlife and fossils. The museum has a temporary exhibit space called the Keller gallery. The museum also has a planetarium show.

Visitors can join as members. The membership program has multiple levels ranging from Individual for one person to Family and higher levels such as Major, Congressman, Governor, and President providing direct support to museum operations.

The museum employs 30 full and part time paid staff members to manage operations. Volunteers assist staff in all areas. The current executive director and curator is Kimberly Kenney.

== Hoover-Price Planetarium ==
The Hoover-Price Planetarium was built during 1962, opened in July 1963, and stands adjacent to the McKinley National Memorial in Canton, Ohio. The Planetarium is housed within the McKinley Presidential Library & Museum.

The primary influence in the design and development of the planetarium was Richard Emmons (1919-2005), senior engineer in the Astronautics Department at Goodyear Aircraft Corporation, and past program director and lecturer at Morehead Planetarium in Chapel Hill, North Carolina. Asteroid 5391 Emmons (1985 RE2) was named in Emmons honor.

The central opto-mechanical star projector, a Spitz Model A-3-P, was enhanced by Emmons to show an additional 1,500 stars. Except for the dome and the sound system, all of the original equipment was purchased from Spitz Laboratories. The dome was made and installed by Astro-Dome, Inc., of Canton. It measures 7.2 meters in diameter and is made of aluminum structural beams covered by a perforated aluminum screen. The planetarium has 60 auxiliary projectors, including solar and lunar eclipses, meteors, life cycle of stars, double stars, Aurora Borealis, rainbows, the Milky Way galaxy, views of the moon and sunrise and sunset.

The construction of the planetarium was and remains privately funded. It is named after the two families whose donations made the project possible, the Hoover family and company and Mr. and Mrs. Harley C. Price. The planetarium has undergone few changes since 1964, except for the addition of two DLP projectors and a computer to generate images. Richard Emmons' son, Thomas Emmons, Emeritus Professor at Kent State's Physics Department, continues to maintain the planetarium. The current director is Suzie Dills, with a part-time staff of five program lecturers. All programming is accomplished in-house.

== Ramsayer Research Library ==
The presidential archive itself is called the "Ramsayer Research Library" and is located in the South Wing of the building.

== See also ==
- National McKinley Birthplace Memorial
- McKinley National Memorial
- McKinley Birthplace Home and Research Center
