= Herbert E. Ives =

American scientist and engineer (1882–1953)

Herbert Eugene Ives
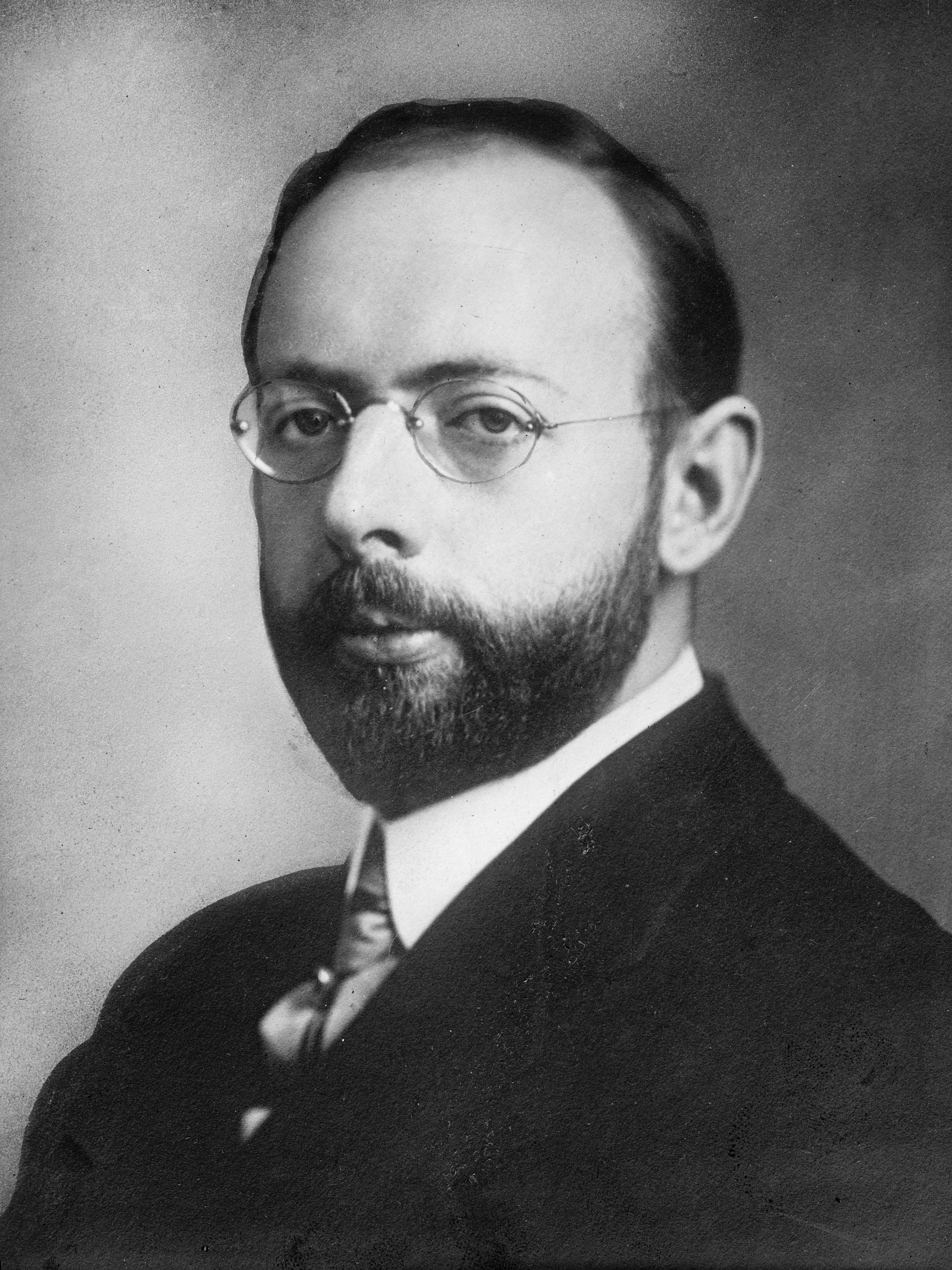
- Ives circa 1913
- Born: July 31, 1882; Philadelphia, Pennsylvania
- Died: November 13, 1953 (aged 71); Upper Montclair, New Jersey
- Education: University of Pennsylvania
- Spouse: Mabel Lorenz (m. 1908)
- Children: Barbara Ives Beyer; Kenneth Ives; Ronald Ives
- Parent(s): Frederic Eugene Ives; Mary Olmstead
- Engineering career
- Projects: facsimile transmission videotelephony television lenticular 3D photography
- Awards: Edward Longstreth Medal (1907, 1915 and 1919); Frederic Ives Medal (1937); Medal for Merit (1948)

Herbert Eugene Ives (July 31, 1882 – November 13, 1953) was a scientist and engineer who headed the development of facsimile and television systems at AT&T in the first half of the twentieth century. He is best known for the 1938 Ives–Stilwell experiment, which provided direct confirmation of special relativity's time dilation, although Ives himself did not accept special relativity, and argued instead for an alternative interpretation of the experimental results. Ives has been described as "the most authoritative opponent of relativity in United States between the late 1930s and the early 1950s."

== Biography ==
Ives was born on July 31, 1882, in Philadelphia, Pennsylvania, to Frederic Eugene Ives and Mary Olmstead. He studied at the University of Pennsylvania and the Johns Hopkins University, where he graduated in 1908. He married Mabel Lorenz in the same year and they had three children.

He wrote a 1920 book on aerial photography while an Army reserve officer in the aviation section. He was president of the Optical Society of America (now Optica) from 1924 to 1925. At the Bell Labs he became its Director of Electro-Optical Research.

Like his father Frederic E. Ives, Herbert was an expert on color photography. In 1924, he transmitted and reconstructed the first color fax, a natural-color photograph of silent film star Rudolph Valentino in period costume, using red, green and blue color separations he photographed on the set of Valentino's film Monsieur Beaucaire.

On April 7, 1927, Ives demonstrated 185-line long-distance television, transmitting live video images of then-Secretary of Commerce Herbert Hoover via AT&T's experimental station 3XN in Whippany, New Jersey, allowing media reporters to both see and communicate with Hoover. By 1930, his two-way television-telephone system (called an ikonophone – Greek: 'image-sound' ) was in regular experimental use. Bell Labs' large New York City research facility devoted years of research and development through the 1930s, led by Dr. Ives with his team of more than 200 scientists, engineers and technicians. Bell Labs intended to develop videotelephony and television for both telecommunications and broadcast entertainment purposes. Ongoing research into combined audio and video telephones was extended by Bell Labs far past Ives' tenure at a cost of over US$500 million, eventually resulting in the deployment of AT&T's futuristic Picturephone.

Also like his father, Ives was interested in autostereoscopic 3D image display methods. In the late 1920s and early 1930s, during his tenure at Bell Labs, he worked on developing procedures and apparatus for producing what he called "parallax panoramagrams", the type of 3D images now familiar from the lenticular 3D postcards and similar novelties that became popular in the mid-1960s and are still being made. He published several articles about his work in this field in the Journal of the Optical Society of America and was granted numerous patents for his inventions.

Following the philosophy of Hendrik Lorentz, he attempted to demonstrate the physical reality of relativistic effects by means of logical arguments and experiments. He is best known for conducting the Ives–Stilwell experiment, which provided direct confirmation of special relativity's time dilation. Ives himself regarded his experiment as a proof of the existence of the ether and hence, as he suggested, a disproof of the theory of relativity. However, this experiment was believed to be the best support for relativity. He was discouraged by the reaction of the scientific community that had interpreted his experiment in the way opposite to his expectations. But he insisted his view that experiment showed the variation of the clock rate with motion indicated the existence of ether.

He then turned to the theory and published a set of articles, where he described relativistic phenomena in terms of a single system of coordinates, which he mistakenly thought would disprove relativity. This paradoxical aspect of Ives's work was described by his friend, the noted physicist H. P. Robertson, who contributed the following summary of Ives's attitude toward special relativity in a biography of Ives:

Ives' work in the basic optical field presents a rather curious anomaly, for although he considered that it disproved the special theory of relativity, the fact is that his experimental work offers one of the most valuable supports for this theory, and his numerous theoretical investigations are quite consistent with it ... his deductions were in fact valid, but his conclusions were only superficially in contradiction with the relativity theory—their intricacy and formidable appearance were due entirely to Ives' insistence on maintaining an aether framework and mode of expression. I ... was never able to convince him that since what he had was in fact indistinguishable in its predictions from the relativity theory within the domain of physics, it was in fact the same theory ...

He was an avid coin collector and served as president of the American Numismatic Society from 1942 to 1946.

Ives died on November 13, 1953, in Upper Montclair, New Jersey.

== Awards and honors ==
- Ives received three times the Edward Longstreth Medal from the Franklin Institute: in 1907, 1915 and 1919.
- He was awarded the Frederic Ives Medal from the Optical Society of America in 1937.
- U. S. President Harry Truman awarded Ives the Medal for Merit in 1948 for his war-time work on blackout lighting and optical communication systems.
- Ives was an elected member of both the American Philosophical Society and the United States National Academy of Sciences.

== See also ==
- Chromatic adaptation
- History of television
- History of videotelephony
- Multiscopy
- Optical Society of America – presidents
- Stationary-wave integrated Fourier-transform spectrometry
