= McKinley National Memorial =

Mausoleum of 25th U.S. President William McKinley in Canton, Ohio

- U.S. National Register of Historic Places
- U.S. National Historic Landmark
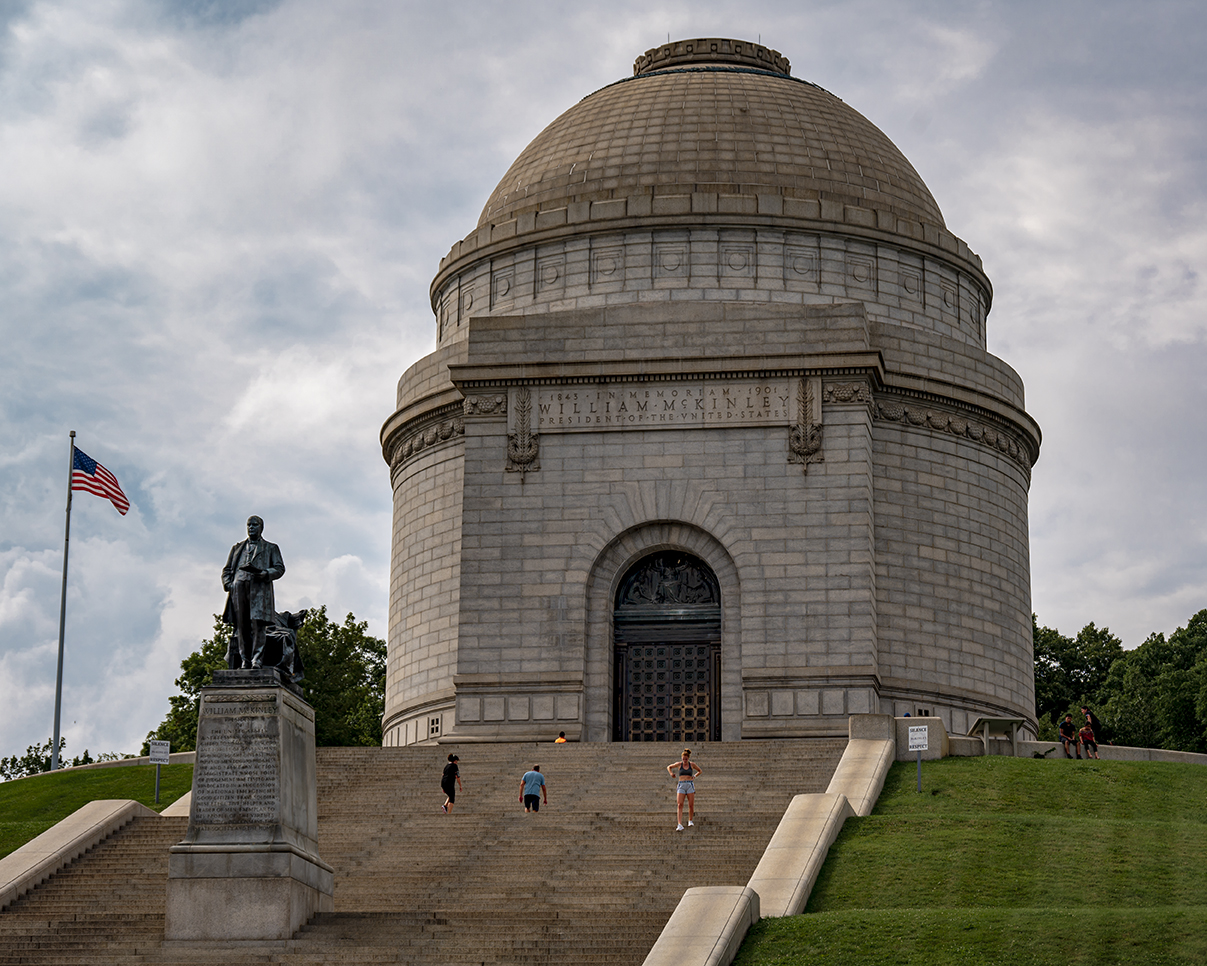
- Interactive map showing McKinley National Memorial’s location
- Location: 7th St., N.W., Canton, Ohio
- Coordinates: 40°48′24″N 81°23′33″W
- Area: 22 acres (8.9 ha)
- Built: 1907
- Architect: Harold Van Buren Magonigle
- Architectural style: Renaissance
- NRHP reference No.: 70000516

Significant dates
- Added to NRHP: November 10, 1970
- Designated NHL: May 15, 1975

The McKinley National Memorial in Canton, Ohio, United States, is the final resting place of William McKinley, who served as the 25th president of the United States from 1897 to his assassination in 1901. Canton was a significant place in McKinley's life; it was where he lived, practiced as an attorney, and conducted his political campaigns.

== Memorial Association, contributions ==
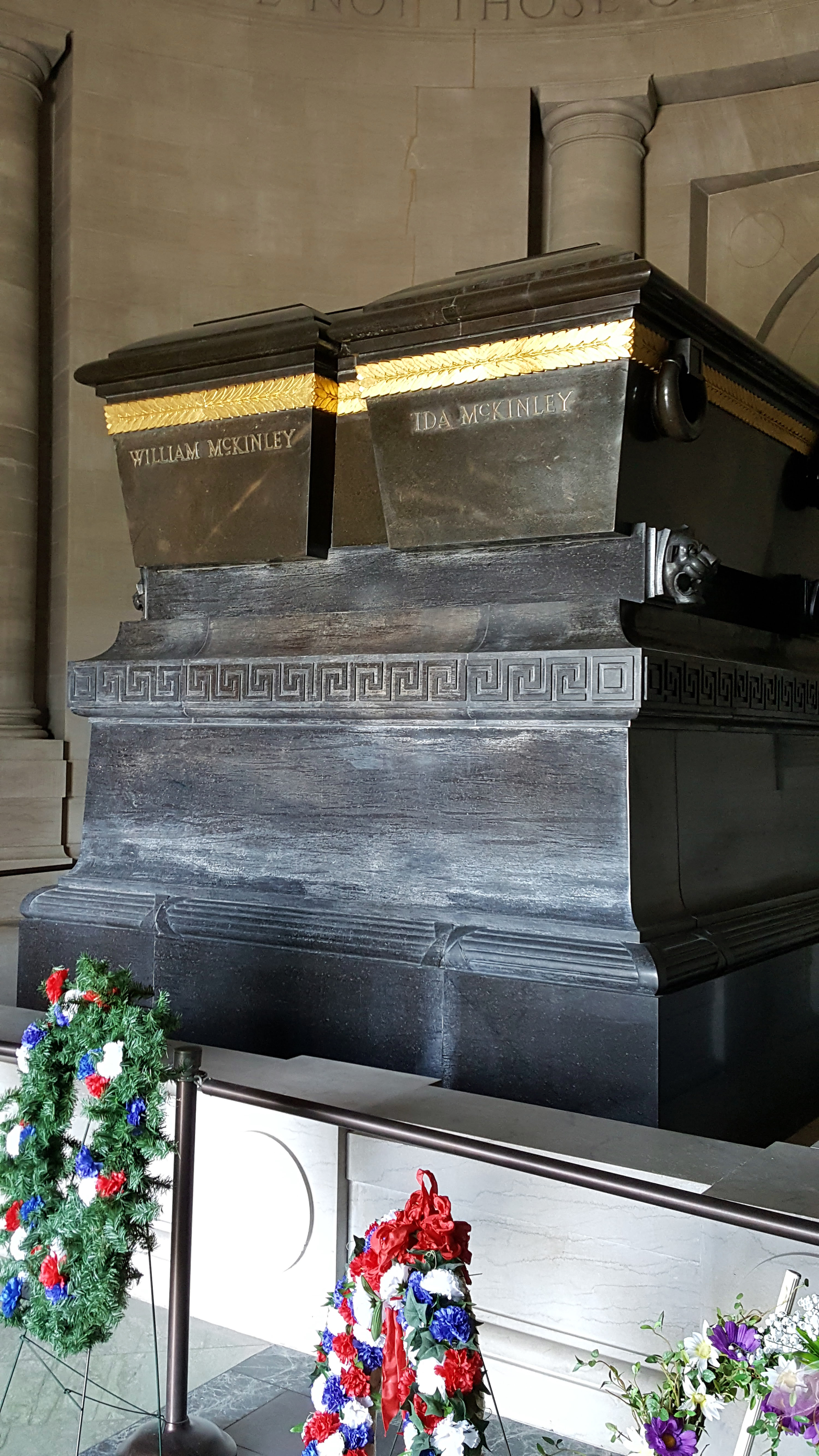
Sarcophagi of William and Ida McKinley

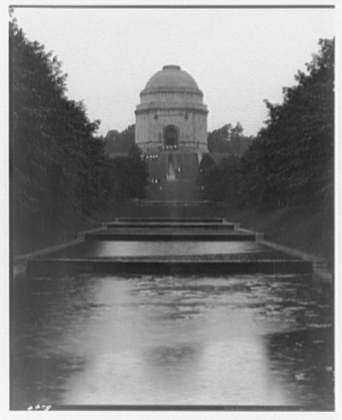
"The Long Water" which was removed in 1951

Following McKinley's funeral, several of his closest advisors, including George B. Cortelyou, William R. Day of Canton and Ohio Senator Mark Hanna, met to discuss the location of a proper memorial to serve as a final resting place for the former president. It was from this meeting that the McKinley National Memorial Association was formed and Theodore Roosevelt chose the first Board of Trustees, with recommendations from the President's widow, Ida Saxton McKinley. The Association chose a site often visited by President McKinley where he had once suggested that a monument be erected to honor soldiers and sailors from Stark County who had been killed in American wars.

By October 10, 1901, the Association issued a public appeal for $600,000 in contributions for the construction project. Ohio Governor George Nash supported the effort by proclaiming McKinley's birthday in 1902 as a special day of observance by the state's schools. On that day school children contributed to the memorial fund in large numbers by bringing in their pennies. In June 1903 contributions reached $500,000, and the Association invited people to submit design ideas for the proposed memorial. Contributions arrived from foreign nations, notably Great Britain.

== Designs, construction ==
Over sixty designs were submitted, and Harold Van Buren Magonigle of New York City was selected as the winner of the competition. Magonigle envisioned a cross-hilted sword with a mausoleum located at the junction of the blade, guard, and hilt. The Long Water (a five-tiered reflecting pool which was 575 feet long) and main steps would form the handle of the sword. This design combined the cross of a martyr with the sword of a President who had acted as commander-in-chief during wartime.

Construction of the memorial began on June 6, 1905, when Magonigle removed the first shovel of soil from the site. By November 16 the cornerstone was laid in an official ceremony attended by the former First Lady, Ida Saxton McKinley, and other family members. More than 35,000 cubic yards (27,000 m³) of soil were added to create four terraces coinciding in height and pitch with the four runs of steps in the main staircase. The steps are 50 feet (15 m) wide and arranged in four flights of 24. Another 12 steps take visitors into the monument. In total, there are 108 steps from ground level to the top of the monument. The interior walls consist of Tennessee marble.

The 9-1/2 foot tall bronze statue depicting President McKinley delivering his final public address at Buffalo, New York, on September 5, 1901 was created by sculptor Charles Henry Niehaus. It is based on a photograph of the President taken by White House photographer Frances B. Johnston at the Pan-American Exposition the day before his assassination.

== Ceremony ==
The McKinley National Memorial dedication on September 30, 1907 was one of the most memorable events in Canton's history. President Theodore Roosevelt joined other dignitaries to observe a grand parade from the review stand at Public Square in downtown Canton. In the dedication ceremony, Supreme Court Justice William R. Day, President of the McKinley National Memorial Association and a former member of McKinley's cabinet, delivered a narrative of events leading to the dedication. United States Poet Laureate James Whitcomb Riley read a memorial poem he wrote in honor of the fallen president. Finally, President Roosevelt, the principal speaker of the day, addressed the crowd, highlighting McKinley's career. Mayor of Canton at the time, Arthur Richard Turnbull, also attended along with Ohio Governor Harris. The coffins of the President and First Lady are entombed above ground in double sarcophagi of green granite.

== Maintenance, re-dedication ==
After the dedication the McKinley National Memorial Association continued to exercise administrative control of the monument, but it eventually became difficult for the Association to maintain the structure and the grounds. On October 20, 1943 the property was transferred to the Ohio State Archaeological and Historical Society, which is now the Ohio History Connection. In 1951 the State of Ohio completed a major rehabilitation to the site, including filling in the Long Water. The work was completed in time for a commemoration of the 50th anniversary of President McKinley's death. A re-dedication of the Memorial was held on September 16, 1951.

The McKinley National Memorial returned to local control in 1973 when the property was transferred to the Stark County Historical Society. After five years of restoration work and enhancement of the grounds the McKinley National Memorial was rededicated on September 29, 1992. The William McKinley Presidential Library and Museum, also operated by the Stark County Historical Society, is located adjacent to the memorial.

== See also ==
- William McKinley Monument, Columbus, Ohio
- Presidential memorials in the United States
- List of sculptures of presidents of the United States
- List of burial places of presidents and vice presidents of the United States
