= William Nicholson Jennings =

American photographer

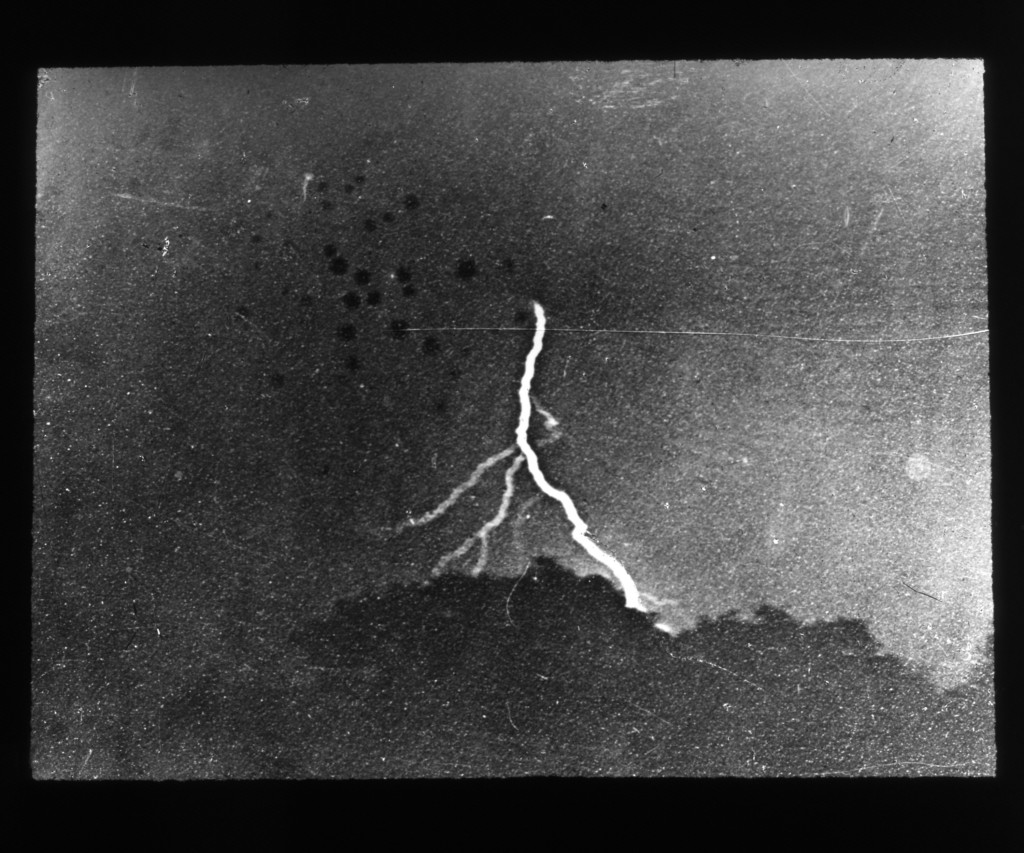
William N. Jennings, First Photograph of Lightning, taken September 2, 1882, Philadelphia

William Nicholson Jennings (1860–1946) was a photographer active in Philadelphia from the 1890s. He conducted experiments with color photography and artificial lightning, helping in the development of photographic flash.

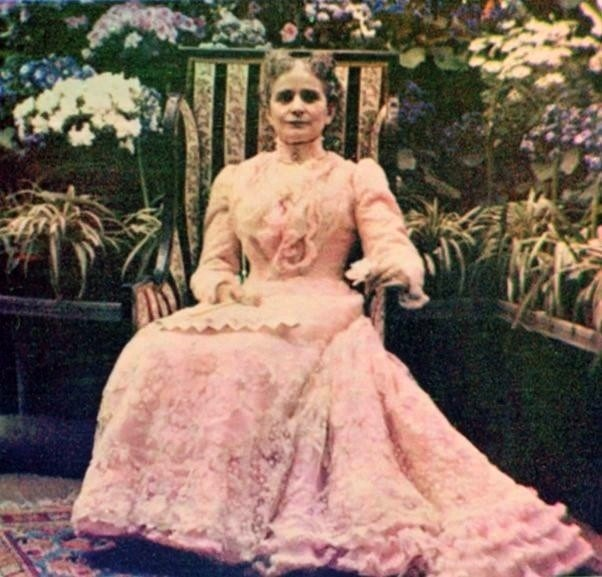
Kromogram color photograph of Ida Saxton McKinley, first lady of the United States from 1897 to 1901, taken by Jennings and Frederic E. Ives.

In 1890 together with Arthur W. Goodspeed he was photographing electric sparks and brush discharges at the University of Pennsylvania, and tried to use a Crookes tube. On February 22nd he noticed disks of unknown origin on one of his plates but nobody could explain them, and the image was forgotten. Only after the discovery of X-rays by Roentgen did Goodspeed and Jennings realize that this was an accidental X-ray photo.
