= Marget Larsen =

American graphic designer

Marget Aagot Larsen (September 10, 1922 – 10 November 1984) was a designer and art director who was influential in American print advertising at a time when the industry was male dominated. Her distinct illustrative and typographic style was directly influenced by the art world, particularly the works of Paul Klee.

== Biography ==
Marget Larsen was born on September 10, 1922, in San Francisco and grew up in Burlingame, California. Her first job was in the San Francisco department store I. Magnin, and she continued to study at night at the California College of the Arts. After a promotion, Larsen worked in the creative department with advertising managers and artists creating promotional work for the department store, creating a playful environment for the store that won her acclaim. Larsen worked as the art director for the specialty department store Joseph Magnin Co., collaborating with advertising manager Toni Harley and fashion illustrator Betty Brader to establish a distinctive graphic look for the fashionable store. In her early career, Larsen studied with a wide variety of artists and designers, including the sculptor Robert Howard and the jewelry designer Margaret de Patta. Her love of art, particularly the art of Paul Klee, influenced her style greatly. Her work typically ignored stylistic conventions of the time, showcasing illustration or attitude rather that product representation and using vibrant colors.

Larsen went to work with advertising innovator Howard Gossage at Weiner & Gossage. Together, they were recognized with changing the face of print advertising at the time, with projects like the paper bags for the Parisian Bakery, which was the first time paper bags had been decorated beautifully as a promotional device, to developing the first ecology ads of the 1960s.

In 1964, she began freelancing, working with Leonard Martin, The Cannery, the Sierra Club, and Alvin Duskin as clients.

The San Francisco Show named their design and art direction award after Larsen.

Marget Aagot Larsen died of cancer in 1984 in San Rafael, California at the age of 62.
