= Ferdinand A. Brader =

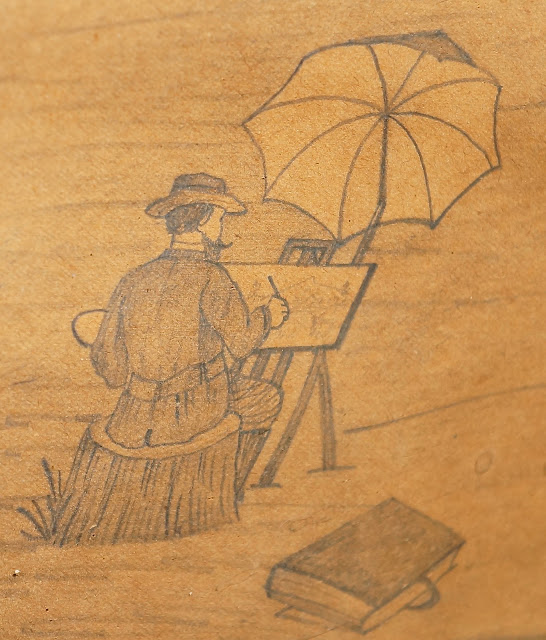
- Ferdinand A. Brader, drawing detail
- Born: December 7, 1833
- Known for: Folk Art

Ferdinand Arnold Brader (December 7, 1833 – December 20, 1901) was a Swiss folk artist. He is known for his large detailed pencil drawings of farms and other dwellings in rural Pennsylvania and Ohio.

== Life in Switzerland ==
Ferdinand Brader was born in Kaltbrunn, St. Gallen, Switzerland, the son of Johann Baptist Brader and Anna Maria Steiner. On August 28, 1860, he married Maria Katherina Karolina Glaus of Benken, St. Gallen, and their son Carl Ferdinand was born December 20, 1864. Ferdinand Arnold Brader emigrated to Pennsylvania in the United States sometime in the early 1870s.

== Life in Pennsylvania and Ohio ==
His first pencil drawings of farms and homes were made in Pennsylvania and dated 1879. Brader created about 300 pictures in Pennsylvania in the counties of Berks, Lancaster, Montgomery and Lebanon and as far west as the counties of Somerset, Beaver and Allegheny. Two Somerset County drawings recently located provide further details not only on farm life in the area at the time, but also the timeline of Brader's travels westward and eventually into Ohio.

The majority of Brader's drawings were done in Ohio. His first Ohio drawings appeared in Tuscarawas and Columbiana Counties in 1884. From drawings that survive it is known that Brader's Ohio pictures were done in 9 different adjoining counties: Portage, Medina, Wayne, Stark, Summit, Carroll, Columbiana, Mahoning and Tuscarawas continuing through 1895. Most of his Ohio images seem to have been done in the counties of Portage and Stark. Both of these counties had county infirmaries or "Poor Houses" where Brader is known to have stayed.

The registry book of the Portage County Infirmary shows that he was there from December 12, 1891, through April 19, 1892, and cite his birth in Switzerland as being in 1833. Recently discovered record books from Stark County indicate that Brader passed the winters of 1892 through 1895 at the Stark County Infirmary, which was later called the County Home.

== Later years ==
Brader's life was abruptly changed by news from Switzerland. In November 1895 he was living at the Stark County Infirmary (Canton, Ohio) when he was notified of the death of his brother, Alois, in 1888. It took authorities almost eight years to find Brader and tell him of the inheritance left to him by his brother who had remained in Kaltbrunn. Upon receiving the news, Ferdinand Brader soon left the County Infirmary and made plans to return to his homeland. According to newspaper records, Brader returned to Switzerland in early February 1896.

== The Drawings of Ferdinand Brader ==
While best known for his hundreds of carefully rendered farmstead pictures, he is also known to have recorded scenes of both the Portage and Stark County Infirmaries, at least one church, railroad stations, a brewery and several rural industries, such as grist mills, potteries, mines and quarries.

Brader typically inscribed his works with the name of the property owner or resident, the date, and, in many cases, its number in the chronology of his completed works. The numbers on his pictures can usually be found with his signature in the lower right or lower left hand corner of his drawings. The highest number recorded among his surviving Ohio drawings suggest he completed as many as 980 works. Drawing number 980 "Homestead of Mr. and Mrs. John Kleiver, Plain Tp. Stark Co. Ohio 1895" is in the collection of The William McKinley Library & Museum in Canton, Ohio. At least 235 drawings have been cataloged, 65 from Pennsylvania and 168 from Ohio. The current count listed by township can be seen here.

Most of his drawings are quite large, some measuring as large as 39" by 53". The vast majority of these were done using only graphite pencil. However, by 1892 Brader had started to use colored pencils as well.

== Exhibitions ==
There have been three exhibitions of Brader's works.

In October 1986, an exhibition was held in Reading, Pennsylvania at the Historical Society of Berks County entitled, "Brader in Berks, 1880-1883" displaying 16 of Brader's drawings and in which an exhibition catalog was provided.

In 1991 the Massillon Museum, in Massillon, Ohio, collaborated with Brader collector and researcher, Darwin D. Bearley of Akron, to organize an exhibition of Ohio drawings, entitled "F.A. Brader, The Ohio Drawings". It ran from January 20, 1991, through March 3, 1991, but no catalog was produced.

From December 4, 2014 – March 15, 2015, the Canton Museum of Art hosted, "The Legacy of Ferdinand A. Brader" 19th Century Drawings of the Ohio and Pennsylvania Landscape an exhibition.

The William McKinley Presidential Library and Museum collaborated by simultaneously exhibiting more drawings in its Keller Gallery. Additional drawings were shown at the Little Art Gallery in North Canton, Ohio.

A monograph, "The Legacy of Ferdinand A. Brader" was published in conjunction with the exhibitions providing in-depth details from the extensive research on this fascinating artist.

The exhibitions and publication trace and document the artistic path of Ferdinand Brader as he traveled through the countryside, adding significant depth to our understanding of American family heritage. The exhibitions were retrospectives of Brader's work in America and included examples from Pennsylvania and Ohio.

== Gallery ==
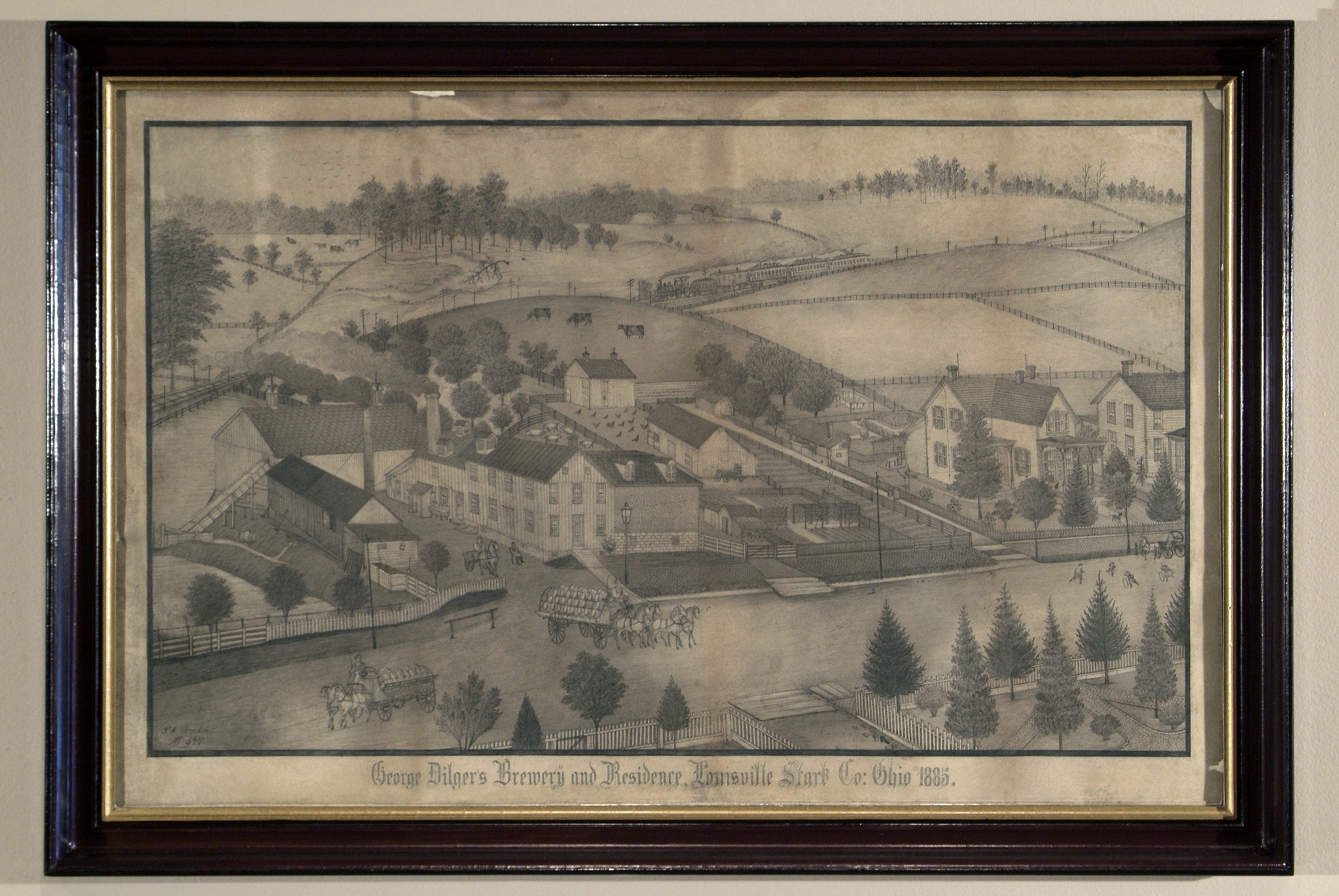
"George Dilger's Brewery and Residence, Louisville, Ohio 1885"

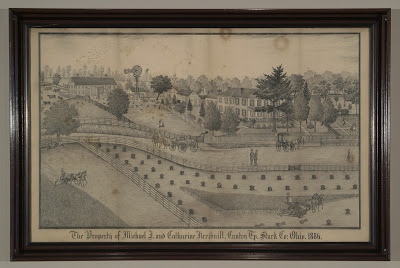
Image of 501, The Kreibuill Farm, courtesy of Canton Museum of Art

== Museums ==
In Pennsylvania, Brader's drawings can be found at the Landis Valley Museum Lancaster, PA. (2); the Historical Society of Berks County Reading, PA.(7); The Reading Public Museum, Reading, PA.(1); Philadelphia Museum of Art, Philadelphia, PA (1); the Library Company of Philadelphia, Philadelphia, PA(1).

In Ohio, Brader's drawings can be found in the collections of the Canton Museum of Art Canton, Ohio, the William McKinley Presidential Library and Museum Canton, Ohio(8); the Massillon Museum, Massillon, Ohio (2); the Portage County Historical Society, Ravenna, Ohio(1); the Carroll Co. Historical Society (Algonquin Mill,) Carrollton, Ohio(1); the Osnaburg Historical Society, East Canton, Ohio (1.)

Elsewhere, the drawings are in collections of the Art Institute of Chicago, Chicago, IL (1) and The Metropolitan Museum of Art, New York City, NY(1). The drawing at the Met can be viewed here through the museum's website.
