= Ida Saxton McKinley =

First Lady of the United States from 1897 to 1901

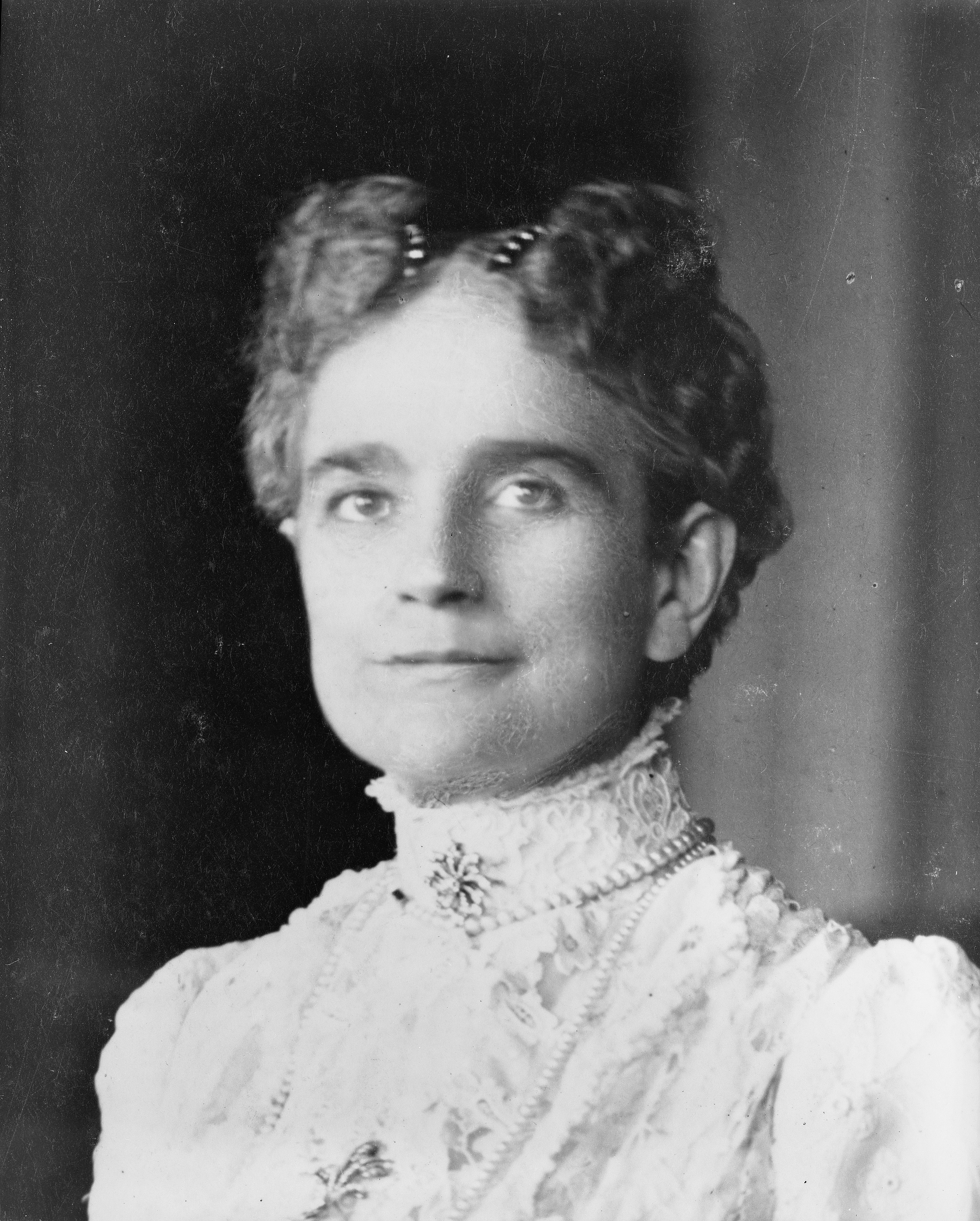
- Portrait, c. 1900

First Lady of the United States
- In role March 4, 1897 – September 14, 1901
- President: William McKinley
- Preceded by: Frances Cleveland
- Succeeded by: Edith Roosevelt

First Lady of Ohio
- In role January 11, 1892 – January 13, 1896
- Governor: William McKinley
- Preceded by: Maud Campbell
- Succeeded by: Ellen Bushnell

Personal details
- Born: Ida Saxton; June 8, 1847 Canton, Ohio, U.S.
- Died: May 26, 1907 (aged 59) Canton, Ohio, U.S.
- Resting place: McKinley National Memorial
- Spouse: William McKinley (m. 1871; died 1901)
- Children: 2
- Education: Brooke Hall Seminary

Ida McKinley (née Saxton; June 8, 1847 – May 26, 1907) was the first lady of the United States from 1897 until 1901, as the wife of President William McKinley. She also served as the First Lady of Ohio from 1892 to 1896 while her husband was the governor of Ohio.

Born to a successful Ohio family, McKinley met her future husband and later married him during the early Reconstruction years. McKinley never recovered from losing their two young daughters due to illness and remained in a fragile state of health for the rest of her life, including having seizures. During campaigns and while in office, her husband took great care to accommodate her needs, as they were a devoted couple. McKinley's ability to fulfill the role of First Lady was nevertheless limited. She was brought further grief by the death of her brother and the assassination of her husband. McKinley reportedly visited her husband's resting place daily until her own death and supported James Benjamin Parker, who had attempted to stop her husband's assassination.

== Early life and marriage ==
Ida Saxton was born on June 8, 1847, in Canton, Ohio, the eldest child of James Saxton, a prominent Canton banker, and Katherine "Kate" DeWalt. Saxton's family was one of Canton's first pioneer families and was quite wealthy. Through his work in banking, James Saxton became the second richest man in Canton. He and Kate DeWalt raised Ida and her younger siblings, Mary and George, in the grand Saxton House. Little is known about Saxton's early childhood. She developed close lifelong relationships with her mother and grandmother, Christiana DeWalt. This likely influenced Saxton's later belief that close intergenerational family connections were a key part of a woman's life. During the American Civil War, Saxton's mother led a volunteer effort to gather supplies and sew uniforms for the Union Army. When Saxton was on break from boarding school, she helped her mother with these tasks.

=== Education ===
Saxton's parents strongly believed in abolitionism and equal education for women. James Saxton was on the board of trustees of Canton's local public schools and enlisted Betsy Mix Cowles, a prominent abolitionist and suffragette, as the principal of Canton Union School. Cowles became a close mentor to Saxton while she was a student there. From 1862 to 1863, Saxton studied at Delphi Academy in Clinton County, New York, as Cowles had moved to teach there. Delphi Academy was Saxton's first boarding school experience and she learned accounting and finance there. However, both Cowles and Saxton left Delphi Academy due to its Confederate sympathies. Saxton later studied at the Sanford School in Cleveland, Ohio, from 1863 to 1865. At all the schools she attended, Saxton excelled in her studies, and was called "an apt learner" and "gifted as a scholar".

Saxton attended finishing school at Brooke Hall Female Seminary from 1865 to 1868, where she was educated in singing, piano playing, linguistics, and needlepoint, skills that would prepare her to become the household hostess. When Saxton had time off from school, she often traveled to Philadelphia, Pennsylvania, to attend opera performances, classical music concerts, or theatrical plays. Saxton made many long-lasting friendships with fellow students and teachers at Brooke Hall Female Seminary, including teacher Harriet Gault. Gault believed that women should be physically active, a progressive idea for the time, inspiring Saxton to take long walks each day to improve her physical fitness.

=== Career and trip to Europe ===
After Saxton graduated from finishing school in 1868, her father insisted that she become an actress to help raise funds for the construction of a new Presbyterian church. That March, Saxton performed at Schaefer's Opera House, posing in tableaus which depicted various scenes from American and European history. Her performance was well-attended, as about twelve hundred people flocked to the opera house and named Saxton "best actress". Saxton also worked as a clerk at Stark County Bank, which her father owned. Saxton later worked as a cashier and managed the bank in her father's absence. Her role in the bank was controversial and her male colleagues believed that she had received an "over-education". However, Saxton defended her position at the bank, believing her father wanted her to support herself without getting married. Excluding the time she spent on Grand Tour, Saxton worked at Stark County Bank until she got married in 1871. When she was not working or traveling, Saxton taught Sunday school at the First Presbyterian Church, the same church her grandfather John Saxton helped establish.

From June to December 1869, Saxton and her younger sister, Mary, took a Grand Tour of Europe chaperoned by Janette Alexander, using the trip as an opportunity to finish their education. The group travelled throughout Europe, visiting Ireland, Scotland, England, Switzerland, The Netherlands, Belgium, France, Germany, and Italy. Saxton visited many art museums and met sculptor Vinnie Ream, who later became famous for her statue of Abraham Lincoln in Paris. Saxton also met a limbless painter named Charles Felir in Amsterdam who painted with his mouth. According to the National First Ladies' Library, "[The artist's] example seems to have inspired her to later insist on living a full public life despite disabilities she developed [later in life]." When the group was in Italy, Alexander arranged for Ida and Mary to meet Pope Pius IX. Although Saxton disliked Roman Catholicism because she thought that "the form and ceremony was too much", she "bowed before [the Pope] and kissed his hand" because she thought he was "such a nice old man". Ida and Mary continued the habit of hiking daily to maintain physical health, hiking throughout the Swiss Alps. Saxton's travels also influenced her social outlook and made her aware of her privileged position, as she witnessed working-class women perform physical labor for little pay. One such example was when Saxton travelled to Belgium and saw lace workers create lace in poor conditions. Saxton decided to purchase a lot of their work to support the lace workers and spent her entire life developing a collection of Belgian lace.

== Marriage and family ==
While working at Stark County Bank, Saxton met William McKinley for the first time in 1868 at a picnic at Meyers Lake, Ohio, about 2 miles (3.2 km) from Canton. He was visiting his sister Anna when he developed an acquaintance with Saxton. At this time, Saxton was engaged to Confederate Army veteran John Wright. However, Wright suddenly died of brain inflammation (most likely meningitis) while Ida was in Europe. After her Grand Tour, Ida was approached by many suitors, but she turned down their offers of marriage.

In 1870, Saxton began seriously courting McKinley after he impressed her with his introduction of Horace Greeley at a lecture. At this time, Saxton was courting other men but was impressed by McKinley's moral character. The two often conversed while performing bank transactions, at friends' homes, or while traveling to teach Sunday school at Saxton's Presbyterian church and McKinley's Methodist church. McKinley also represented the Saxton family in court, winning claims for them. Although Saxton's father encouraged her to court McKinley, Saxton asserted that she was not influenced by her father to accept McKinley's marriage proposal. On January 25, 1871, Ida Saxton, aged 23, married William McKinley, aged 27, at the newly built First Presbyterian Church in Canton in a joint Methodist-Presbyterian service. The service was attended by 1,000 people, as Ida was considered the belle of Canton. Following the wedding, performed by the Reverend E. Buckingham and the Reverend Dr. Endsley, the couple attended a reception at the home of the bride's parents and then secretly travelled to New York for their honeymoon.

=== Children and development of illness ===
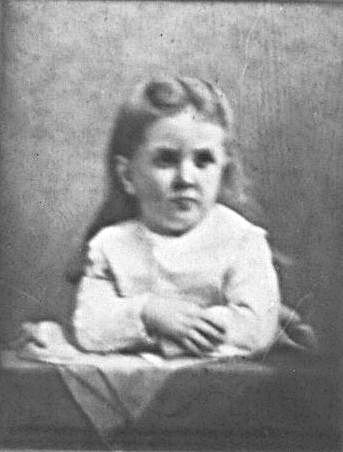
The portrait of Katie that hung on the wall of the McKinley house

After their honeymoon, William and Ida McKinley returned to Canton and lived in St. Cloud Hotel for a time until Ida's father bought them a small house on North Market and Elizabeth Street. The first two years of their marriage were reportedly happy, and Ida affectionately called William "major" in public and "dearest" in private. Their first child, Katherine "Katie", was born on Christmas Day, 1871, while William was still a lawyer in Canton. She was adored by her parents, becoming the center of the household. Katie was smothered with love by Ida, getting both her photograph taken and an oil painting done. After Katie was born, Ida returned to her busy social life, making numerous public appearances with William. Ida also joined William's Methodist church and Katie was baptized.

McKinley became pregnant again shortly thereafter. During this time, her mother began developing cancer and died on March 20, about two weeks before McKinley gave birth. At her mother's burial, McKinley fell while stepping into or out of a carriage, striking her head. This likely caused her to develop epilepsy and phlebitis. On April 1, McKinley gave birth to a sickly infant also named Ida following a very difficult delivery, and the baby died four months later of cholera on August 20. Historian Carl Sferrazza Anthony believes that because Ida became immunocompromised during her second pregnancy, she gave birth to a sickly daughter.

McKinley was grief-stricken, and she believed that God punished her by killing her daughter. McKinley was deeply affected by this and desperately feared the loss of her firstborn child. Among the many ailments she developed, McKinley's walking ability was impaired and she lost strength in her dominant hand. Dr. Whitney, her father's physician, cared for McKinley's maladies and ordered complete rest. Unable to care for Katie and be separated from her father, the McKinleys moved into the Saxton House for six months and Ida's sister Mary took care of Katie. McKinley spent hours a day in a darkened room with Katie in her arms, kissing her and weeping. She would not let Katie leave her sight unless William took her for a drive. William's brother, Abner, once found Katie swinging on a gate of the garden of her house and invited her to go for a walk with him. The child replied that "if [she] would go out of the yard, God would punish [her] mama some more." In June 1875, Katie became ill and died of heart disease (Note: While "heart disease" was listed as the official cause of Katie's death, sources disagree on the actual cause of death, as some argue she died of typhoid or scarlet fever) on June 25.

After Katie died, McKinley was plunged into a state of deep depression and she prayed for her own death. McKinley ate very little food and her seizures worsened. William did everything in his power to retain her "interest in existence", offering to sacrifice his political ambitions for her well-being. Ida clung tightly to William, commissioning a painting of him and hanging it on the wall across from her bed. She stopped going to church, believing that God had abandoned her. In the early 1890s, Ida started believing in reincarnation and became interested in Eastern religions after attending a lecture on the subject, hoping that she would meet her daughters again. When Ida saw little girls, she stared intently at them, hoping one of her daughters had come back. Ida made every effort to preserve her children's memory, hanging the picture of Katie on her wall as well as preserving her clothes and rocking chair.

== Illness ==
Affected by a neurological condition later identified as epilepsy, McKinley experienced the onset of seizures following a period of intense personal loss, including the deaths of her mother and two young daughters. Due to this, McKinley lived with significant health challenges for the rest of her life and became increasingly reliant on her husband. Despite her illness, McKinley maintained an active domestic presence, crocheting thousands of slippers for friends, acquaintances, and charities, which would auction for large sums. For symptom management, she was prescribed barbiturates, laudanum, and other sedatives common in that era.

== First Lady of the United States ==
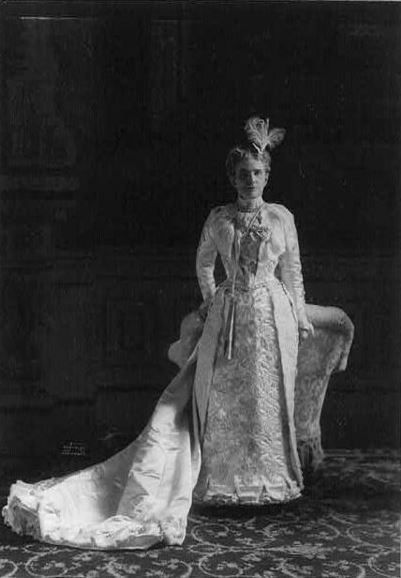
Ida McKinley in an official photograph as First Lady

President McKinley took great care to accommodate her condition. In a break with tradition, he insisted that his wife be seated next to him at state dinners rather than at the other end of the table. At receiving lines, Ida alone remained seated. Many of the social chores normally assumed by the First Lady fell to Mrs. Jennie Tuttle Hobart, wife of Vice President Garret Hobart. Guests noted that whenever Mrs. McKinley was about to undergo a seizure, the President would gently place a napkin or handkerchief over her face to conceal her contorted features. When it passed, he would remove it and resume whatever he was doing as if nothing had happened.

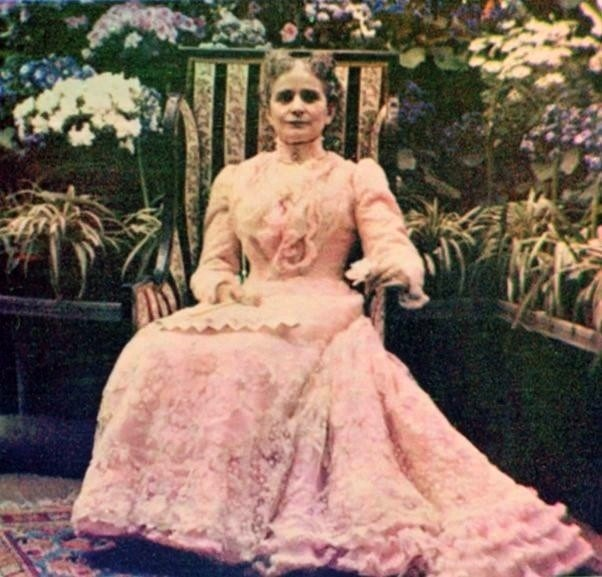
Ida McKinley photographed in color with the Kromogram process by Frederic Ives and William N. Jennings in the White House conservatory.

The First Lady often traveled with the President. McKinley traveled to the Western United States with him in May 1901. Along the way, she became the first First Lady to venture outside of the United States while holding that position, attending a breakfast in Ciudad Juárez, Mexico on May 6, while the President remained behind in El Paso, Texas. However, she became severely ill in San Francisco and nearly died. The planned tour of the Northwest was canceled, and their train returned to Washington along the most direct possible route. McKinley also accompanied the President on his trip to Buffalo, New York, in September of that year when he was assassinated, but was not present at the shooting.

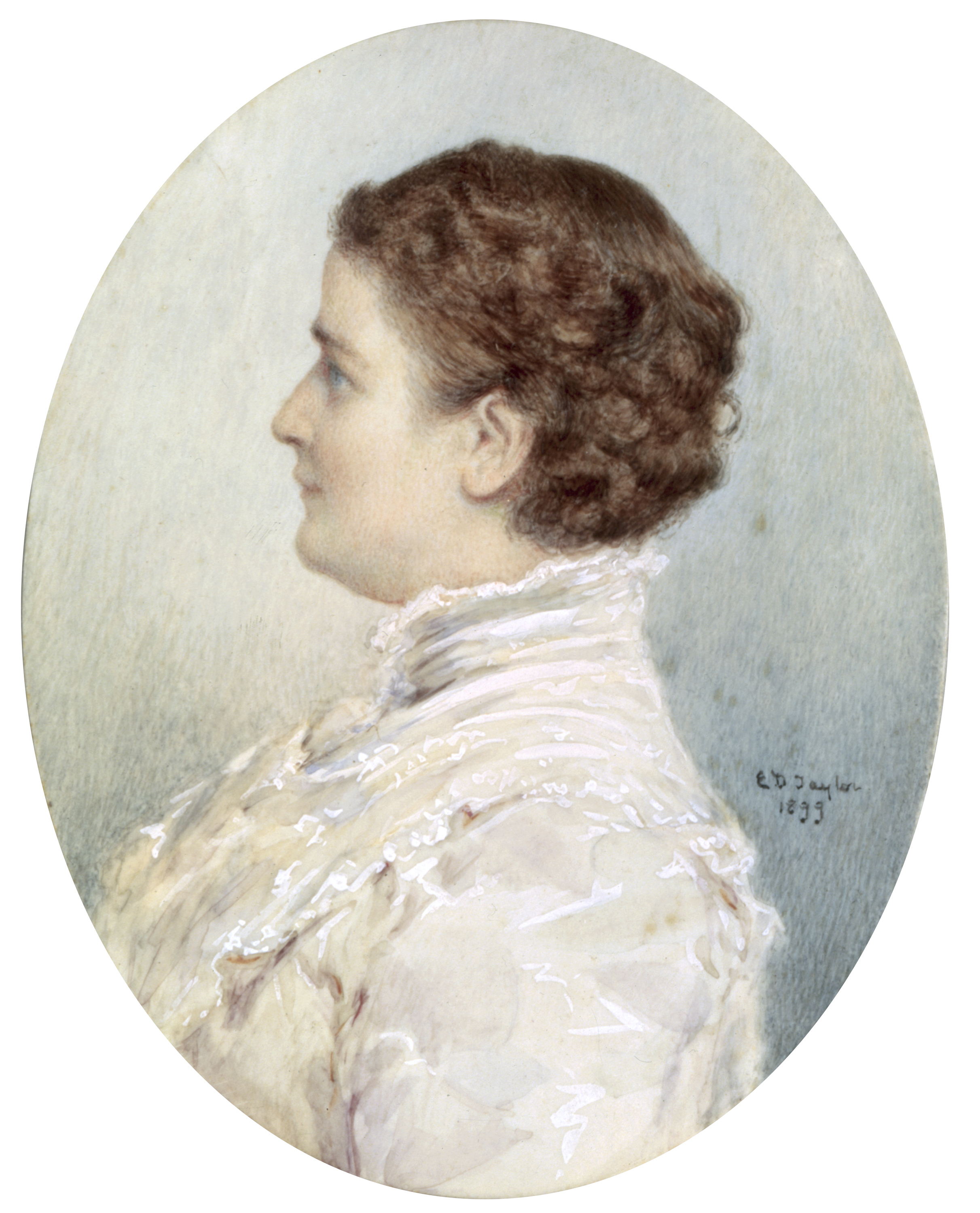
Ida Saxton McKinley, official White House portrait

On September 6, 1901, President McKinley was shot in Buffalo, New York, in the stomach by a 28-year-old anarchist named Leon Czolgosz. Doctors were unable to locate the bullet and the President's wound eventually became infected with gangrene. He died eight days later at age 58. Relatives and friends gathered around his death bed. The first lady sobbed over her husband saying, "I want to go, too. I want to go, too." President McKinley replied, "We are all going, we are all going. God's will be done, not ours", and with final strength put an arm around her. He may also have sung part of his favorite hymn, "Nearer, My God, to Thee", although some other accounts have the first lady singing it softly to him.

== Later life and death ==
With the death of her husband, McKinley lost much of her will to live. Although she bore up well in the days between the shooting and his death, McKinley could not bring herself to attend his funeral. Her health eroded as she withdrew to the safety of her home and memories in Canton. McKinley was cared for by her younger sister. The President was interred at the Werts Receiving Vault at West Lawn Cemetery until his memorial was built. Ida visited daily until her own death. In 1907, Ida received a letter from James Benjamin Parker, who attempted to stop her husband's assassination, asking for help. McKinley, who was grateful for Parker's efforts, sent the letter to George Cortelyou and Parker was given permanent employment at the United States Capitol and a house in Washington, D.C.. A month after Parker's death, Ida McKinley died on May 26, 1907, less than two weeks before her 60th birthday. McKinley was prepared to reunite with her husband that her last words were reportedly, "O! God, why should I longer wait? Let me lie beside him." McKinley was entombed next to her husband and their two daughters in the McKinley Memorial Mausoleum in Canton. Canton-born opera singer Rachel Frease-Green, who sang at William McKinley's funeral, also sang at Ida's.

== Murder of brother George Saxton ==
Three years before the assassination of her husband, Ida McKinley's only brother, George DeWalt Saxton (1850–1898), was murdered. Dressmaker Mrs. Anna "Annie" E. Ehrhart George was accused of the murder, then tried from April 2–24, 1899.

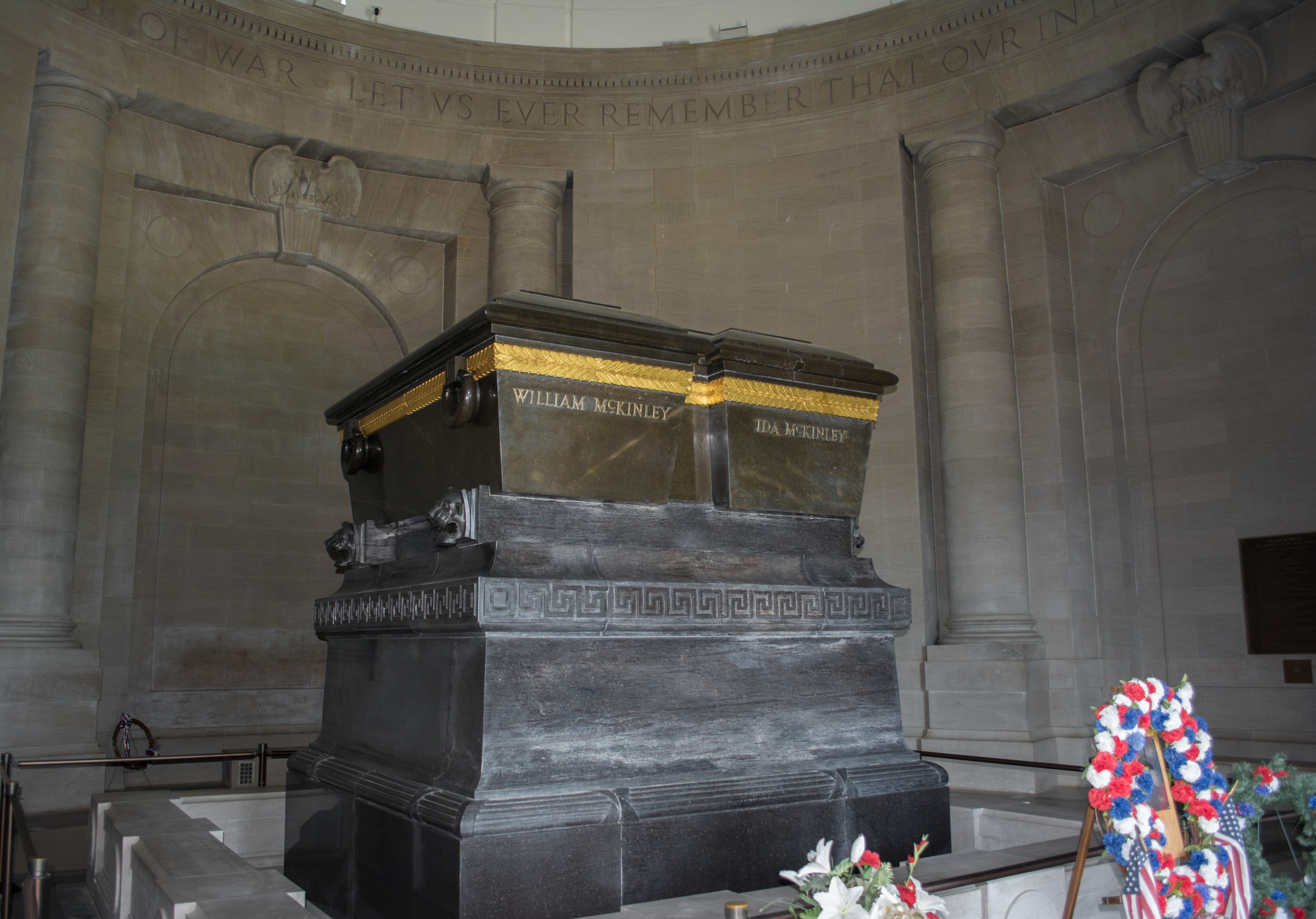
The tomb of William and Ida McKinley

Following nine years of wooing George, and six more years indulging in their affair, Saxton had then requested and financed his lover's divorce from her husband, Sample C. George—who had, in 1892, sued Saxton in the Supreme Court for alienation of affections, settling for $1,850 plus legal costs (after quietly remarrying Lucy Graham)—but Saxton later spurned his conquest. Failing to successfully sue Saxton for breach of promise, George was accused of fatally shooting him as he approached the home of another woman—an act she had repeatedly threatened.

Neither the Saxtons nor McKinleys attended the trial. The media championed her case; George claimed self-defense and was acquitted of first-degree murder by a jury. Nobody else was ever charged with the crime. George later married Dr. Arthur Cornelius Ridout, reputedly an alcoholic and a gambler, whose death by hanging from a chandelier was ruled a suicide.

== Legacy ==
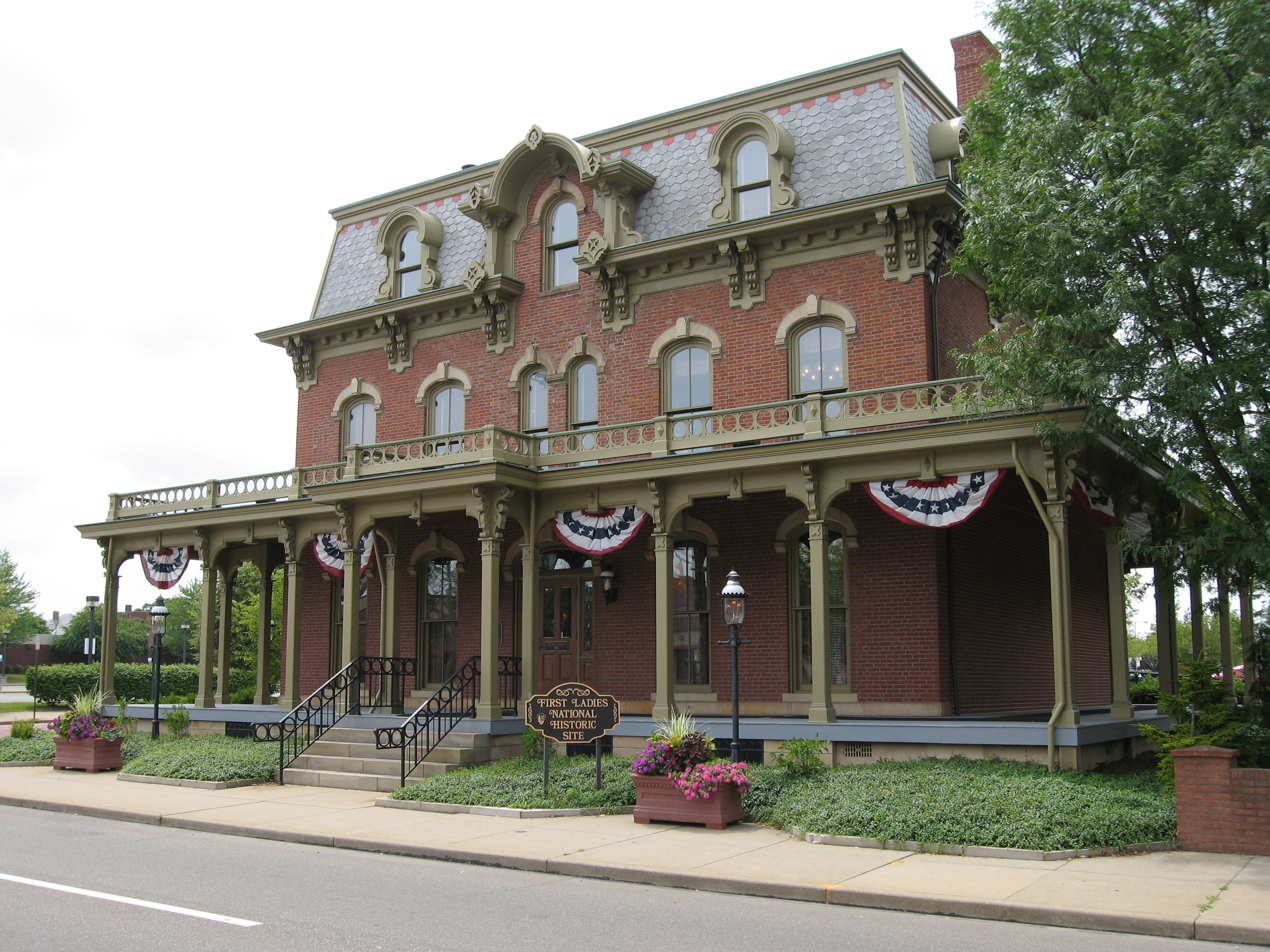
The Saxton House, former home of Ida Saxton McKinley, now part of the First Ladies National Historic Site.

The childhood home of Ida Saxton McKinley, the Saxton House, has been preserved on Market Avenue in Canton. In addition to growing up in the house, she and her husband also lived there from 1878 to 1891, the period during which the future President McKinley served as one of Ohio's Congressional Representatives. The house was restored to its Victorian splendor and became part of the First Ladies National Historic Site at its dedication in 1998.

== Bibliography ==
- Anthony, Carl Sferrazza (2013). Ida McKinley: The Turn-of-the-Century First Lady through War, Assassination, and Secret Disability. The Kent State University Press. p. 376. ISBN 978-1-60635-152-9.
- Barden, Cindy (1996). Meet the First Ladies. Teaching & Learning Co. p. 140. ISBN 978-1-4291-1121-8.
- Edge, Laura Bufano (2007). William McKinley. Twenty-First Century Books. p. 112. ISBN 978-0-8225-1508-1.
- Gould, Lewis L. (2001). American First Ladies: Their Lives and Legacy. New York, New York: Routeledge. ISBN 0-415-93021-9.
- Kenney, Kimberly A. (2004). Canton's West Lawn Cemetery. Charleston, S.C.: Arcadia Publishing. ISBN 978-0-7385-3309-4.
- Leech, Margaret (1959). In the Days of McKinley. New York: Harper and Brothers. OCLC 456809.
- McClure, Alexander K.; Morris, Charles (1901). The Authentic Life of William McKinley our Third Martyr President. Cornell University.
- Miller, Scott (2011). The President and the Assassin. New York: Random House. ISBN 978-1-4000-6752-7.
- Morgan, H. Wayne (2003). William McKinley and His America (Revised ed.). The Kent State University Press. ISBN 978-0-87338-765-1.
- Quinn-Musgrove, Sandra L.; Kanter, Sanford (1995). America's royalty: all the presidents' children. Greenwood Publishing Group. p. 286. ISBN 978-0-313-29535-5.
- Russo, Amy (2021). Women of the White House: The Illustrated Story of the First Ladies of the United States of America. London, United Kingdom: Webleck. ISBN 978-1-78739-388-2.
- Schneider, Dorothy; Schneider, Carl J. (2010). First Ladies: A Biographical Dictionary. New York, New York: Facts on File. ISBN 978-0-8160-7724-3.
- Swain, Susan (2015). First Ladies: Presidential Historians on the lives of 45 Iconic American Women. New York, New York: PublicAffairs. ISBN 978-1-61039-566-3.
- Watson, Robert P. (2015). American First Ladies. Ipswich, Massachusetts: Salem Press. ISBN 978-1-61925-942-3.

Honorary titles
Preceded by Maud Campbell	First Lady of Ohio; 1892–1896	Succeeded by Ellen Bushnell
Preceded by Frances Cleveland	First Lady of the United States; 1897–1901	Succeeded by Edith Roosevelt
