= First Ladies National Historic Site =

National Historic Site of the United States

- U.S. National Register of Historic Places
- U.S. National Historic Site
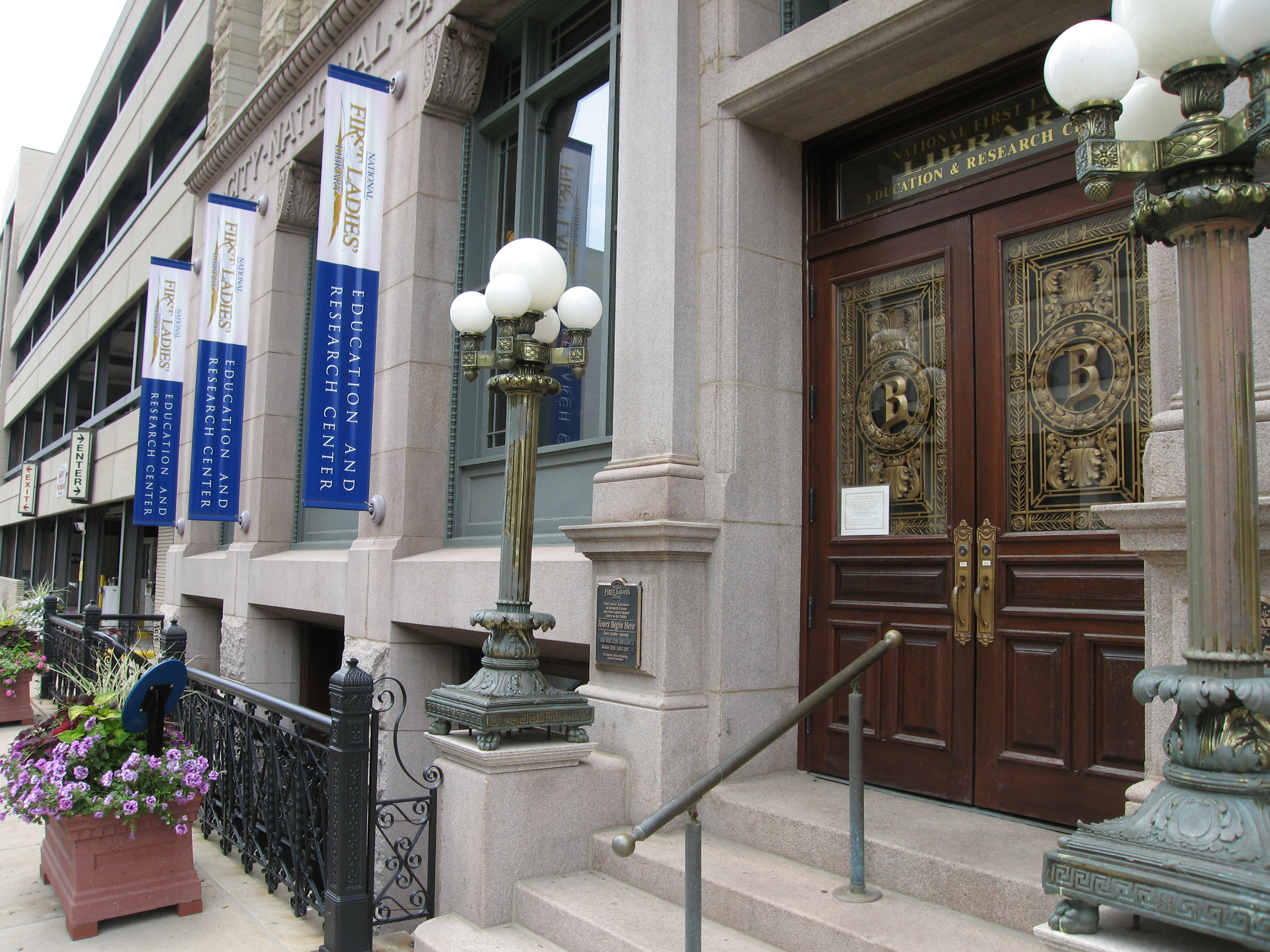
- The main entrance of the First Ladies National Historic Site.

- Location within Ohio Location within the United States
- Interactive map showing the location for First Ladies National Historic Site
- Location: 205 and 331 Market Avenue South, Canton, Ohio
- Coordinates: 40°47′48″N 81°22′31″W
- Area: 0.46 acres (0.0019 km^{2})
- Visitation: 11,187 (2023)
- Website: First Ladies National Historic Site
- NRHP reference No.: 01000286

Significant dates
- Added to NRHP: January 31, 2001
- Designated NHS: October 11, 2000

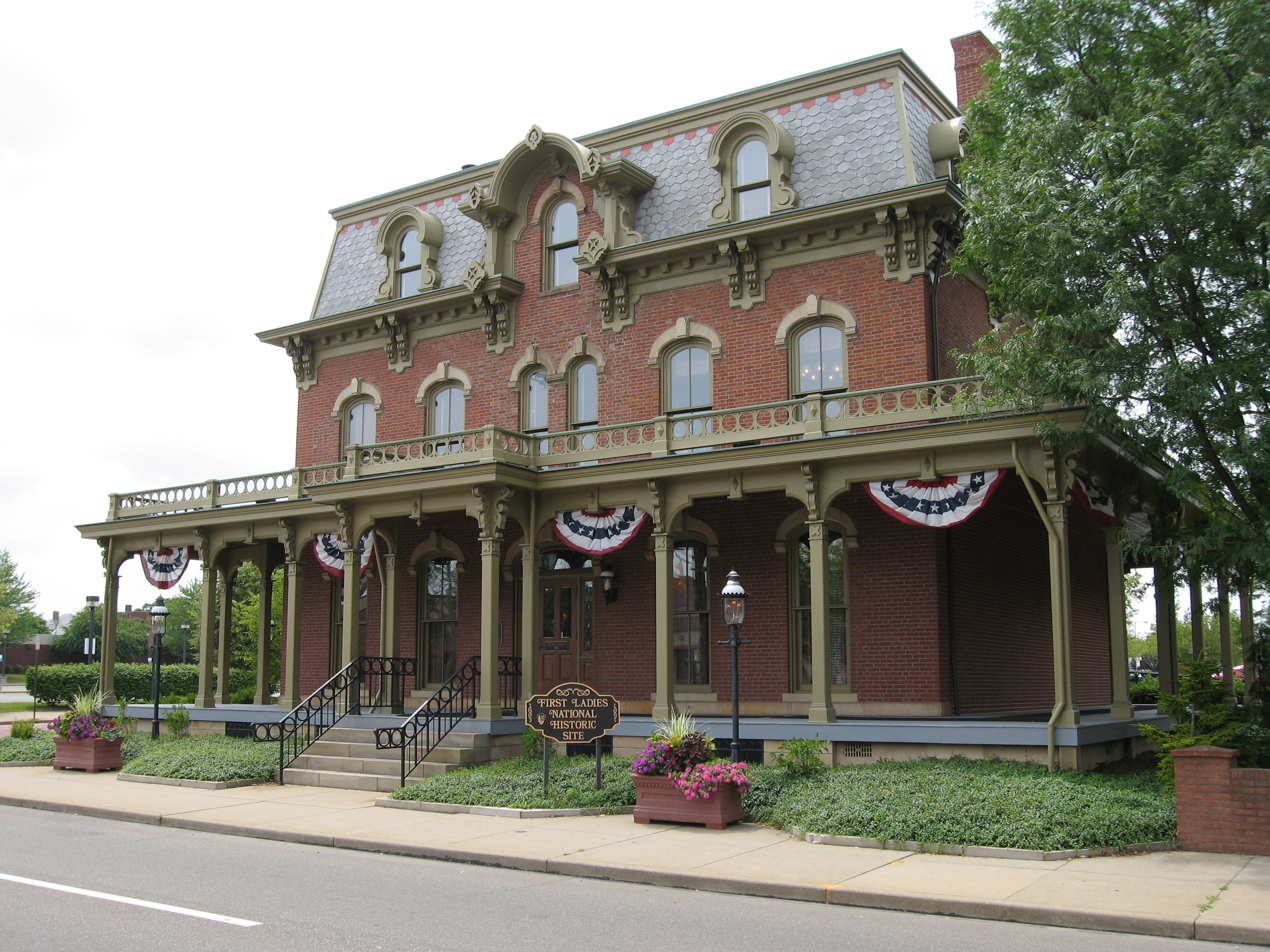
The Saxton House, former home of Ida Saxton McKinley

First Ladies National Historic Site is a United States National Historic Site located in Canton, Ohio. During her residency in Washington, D.C. Mary Regula, wife of Ohio representative Ralph Regula, spoke regularly about the nation's first ladies. Recognizing the paucity of research materials available she created a board to raise funds and for a historian to assemble a comprehensive bibliography on American first ladies. From these inspirations came a National First Ladies’ Library, established in 1996, and the First Ladies National Historic Site.

== Overview ==
Established in 2000 to commemorate all the United States First Ladies, the First Ladies National Historic Site comprises two buildings: the Education & Research Center and the preserved historic home of Ida Saxton McKinley, the wife of U.S. president William McKinley. The brick Victorian house, built in 1841 and modified in 1865, was Ida's birthplace and childhood home, and William McKinley later live with Ida in this house for over twenty years while he worked as a Canton attorney and a member of the U.S. House of Representatives. Three floors of the home can be viewed by ticketed guided tour.

The Education & Research Center, housed in the former City National Bank Building (1895), offers three floors to the public at no charge. The first floor features a large exhibit hall of rotating exhibits as well as a small replica of the first White House Library created by First Lady Abigail Fillmore. This building also contains a small gift shop and the National Park Service Welcome Center which provides information and ticketed tours of the Saxton House. The second floor contains a space for children to learn about the First Ladies and the basement level features a theater and a smaller exhibit space. The top four floors contain conference rooms, office space, and storage that is closed to the public.

The site is operated by the National First Ladies' Library in a partnership agreement with the National Park Service and managed by Cuyahoga Valley National Park.

== Maintenance cost issues ==
Since its creation in the year 2000, the historic site has faced many problems. The maintenance cost was estimated in 2014 at $220,000 for a complete restoration. That figure kept climbing until the year 2017 when it needed $1,017,000. The cost decreased to $882,000 in 2018.

== See also ==
- Bibliography of United States presidential spouses and first ladies
