= Betty Brader =

American fashion illustrator

Betty Brader (1923–1986) was an American fashion illustrator best known for her stylish depictions of trendsetting fashions for the San Francisco specialty-store chain Joseph Magnin Co. Working closely with art director Marget Larsen and advertising director Toni Harley, Brader helped to establish the store's image through her graphic posters and newspaper advertisements. Brader also accepted freelance jobs with clients such as Neiman Marcus department store in Dallas. She created record album covers, including a 1956 album for Cal Tjader Quintet. A large collection of Brader's posters for Joseph Magnin is housed in the Smithsonian Institution's National Museum of American History. Brader received awards from the Art Directors' Club chapters in San Francisco, New York, and Los Angeles.
