= Tom Benson Hall of Fame Stadium =

Football stadium in Canton, Ohio

Tom Benson Stadium
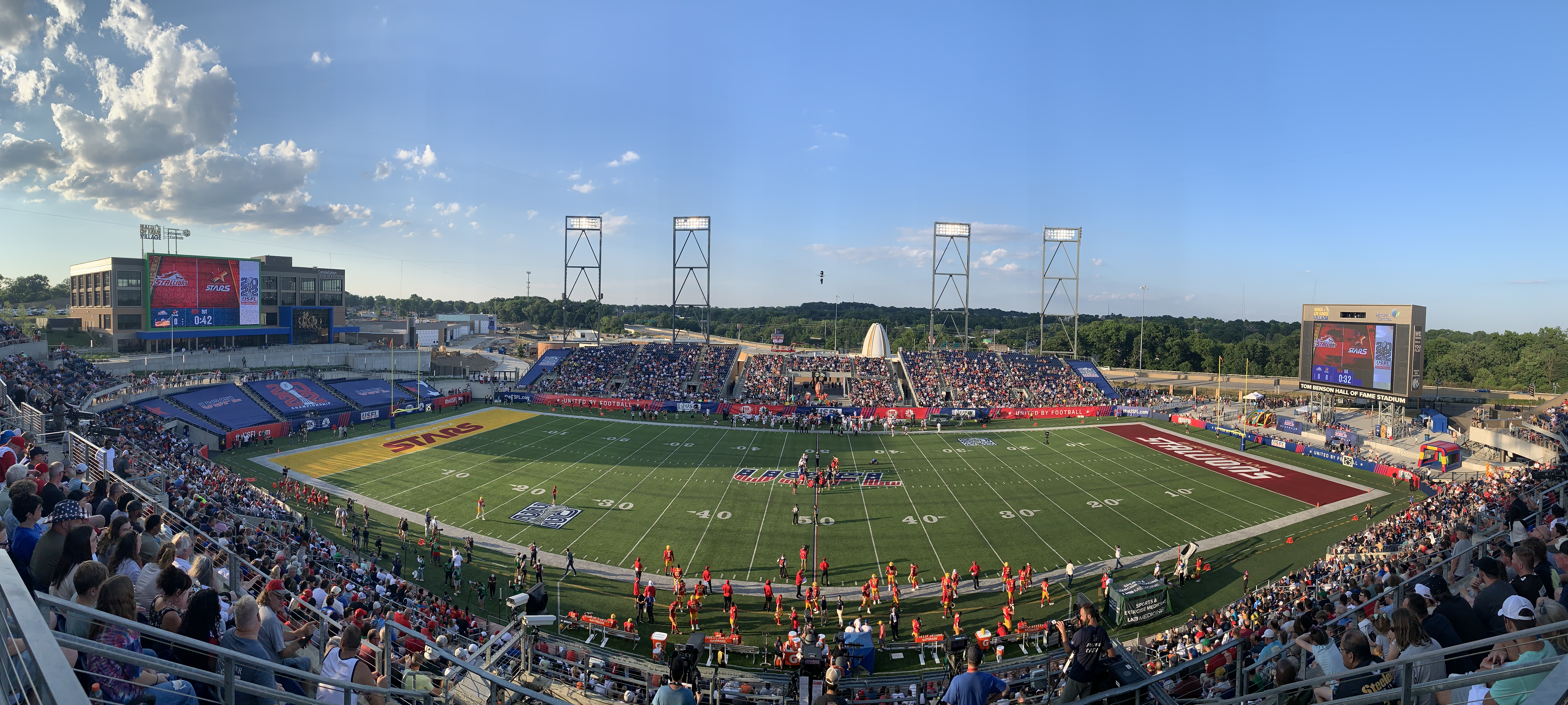
- 2022 USFL Championship Game held at the stadium

- Location in Ohio Location in the United States
- Former names: Fawcett Stadium (1938–2015)
- Location: 1835 Harrison Ave NW, Canton, Ohio, U.S.
- Coordinates: 40.820°N 81.398°W
- Owner: Canton City School District
- Capacity: 23,000
- Surface: Natural grass (1938–1997); AstroTurf (1997–2016); Turf Nation (2016–2023); ForeverLawn (2023–present)

Construction
- Groundbreaking: 1924
- Opened: 1938, 88 years ago
- Renovated: 2015–2021
- Cost: US$500,000 Renovation: 2015: $139 million

Tenants
- Hall of Fame Game (NFL) (1962–present); Canton McKinley Bulldogs (OHSAA) (1924–present); Walsh Cavaliers (NCAA) (1998–2022); Lincoln Lions (OHSAA) (1926–1975); Lehman Polar Bears (OHSAA) (1932–1975); GlenOak Golden Eagles (OHSAA) (1997–2006); Timken Trojans (OHSAA) (1976–2014); Malone Pioneers (NCAA) (1993–2018)

Website
- hofvillage.com/tom-benson-stadium

Tom Benson Hall of Fame Stadium, formerly Fawcett Stadium, is a football stadium and entertainment complex in Canton, Ohio. It is a major component of Hall of Fame Village, located adjacent to the grounds of the Pro Football Hall of Fame. The venue hosts the annual Pro Football Hall of Fame Game and serves as the home field for the football team from Canton McKinley High School. It also served as the home field for Malone University from 1993 to 2018 and Walsh University from 1998 to 2022. It also served as the home stadium for a number of other Canton-area high schools.

The stadium was constructed as a replacement for League Field, the city's previous stadium, where Canton's professional football team, the Bulldogs, played many of their games. First dedicated as Fawcett Stadium in 1938, the stadium's original name honored the memory of John A. Fawcett, a former Canton board of education member, who died several years before the stadium was completed.

On November 24, 2014, it was announced that Tom Benson, owner of the New Orleans Saints, would be donating $11 million to the Pro Football Hall of Fame, $10 million of which was to go into renovating Fawcett Stadium and recouping the money by renting use of the stadium. In response to Benson's donation, the Hall of Fame announced that Fawcett Stadium would be renamed Tom Benson Hall of Fame Stadium, which was dedicated on August 3, 2017. Benson died less than a year later, on March 15, 2018.

The renovation of Tom Benson Hall of Fame Stadium was part of the approximately $200 million construction completed in Phase I of the Hall of Fame Village expansion project.

== Construction ==
The stadium was built from 1937 to 1939 at an estimated cost of $500,000. The federal government paid for $400,000 in the form of WPA manpower, while a school board bond issue paid for the materials. The stadium originally seated 15,000 and was the largest high school stadium in the country at that time.

On the grounds of the facility was a park, aptly named "Stadium Park". This park still exists, although it is now much more disconnected from the stadium, as part of it was used for the site of the Pro Football Hall of Fame, and the rest of the park is separated from Tom Benson Stadium by Interstate 77.

== History ==
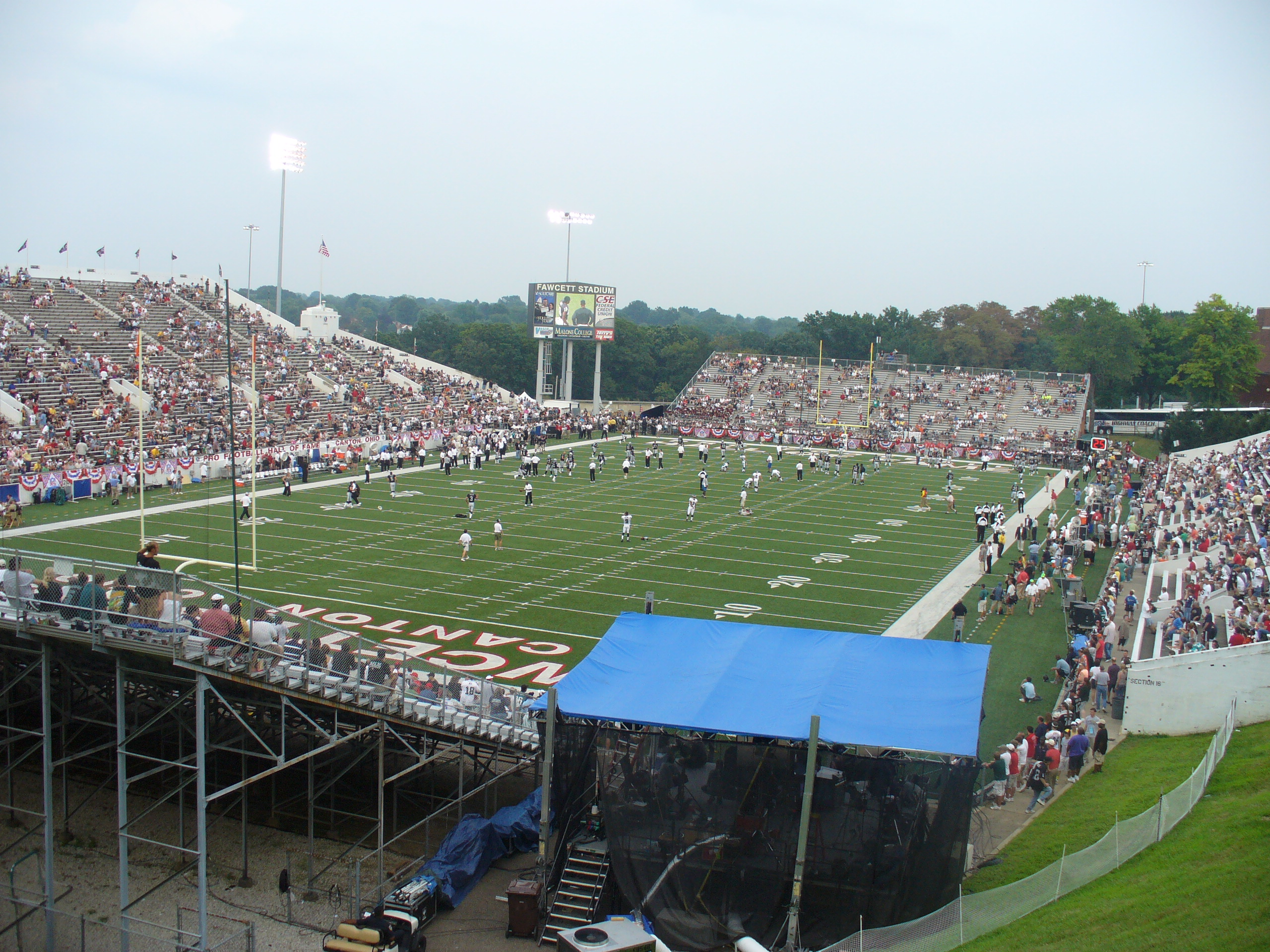
The stadium in 2006

Tom Benson Hall of Fame Stadium seats 23,000 and has an NFL-caliber press box.

Five Canton area high schools have played their football seasons on this field (McKinley Bulldogs, Lincoln Lions, Lehman Polar Bears, GlenOak Golden Eagles, and Canton Timken Trojans). Future Cleveland Browns great and Pro Football Hall of Famer Marion Motley, who along with fellow Hall of Famer Bill Willis broke the color barrier in modern professional football with the Cleveland Browns in 1946, scored the first touchdown in the stadium in 1938. Each summer, it hosts the annual Pro Football Hall of Fame Game, the first contest of the National Football League (NFL) exhibition season.

Malone University also previously utilized the stadium as their home field for football until the program was discontinued after the 2018 season.

It is presently the home field for the McKinley Senior High School. The Ohio High School Athletic Association football state championship games were split between Fawcett Stadium and nearby Paul Brown Tiger Stadium in Massillon between 1991 and 2014, and all football state championship games have been played at the stadium since 2017.

In 1997, the stadium underwent a major renovation and a name change. Backed by the Canton community, $4.3 million worth of improvements were completed on the stadium. Some of the major improvements included state-of-the-art Astroturf with a player friendly rubber base, new locker room facilities, new scoreboard with graphics display screen, new lighting, new sound system, new electrical services, structural repairs, vinyl caps for all wooden seats, and a renovated press box. The newly renovated facility was also renamed to include the words Pro Football Hall of Fame Field.

From 1997 to 2000, Benson Stadium was the home of the Victory Bowl, the NCCAA championship football game. In 2002, The Sporting News rated Benson Stadium the number one high school football venue in America.

In 2009, the stadium hosted the inaugural IFAF Junior World Championship of American Football. The tournament gathered 16 best national teams from around the world. It hosted the 2015 IFAF World Championship in 2015.

On February 24, 2021, the Women's Football Alliance announced a multi-year deal to host its championship weekend at the Stadium.

On August 29, 2021, the stadium was the site of a high school football game between Bishop Sycamore and IMG Academy, in which IMG Academy defeated Bishop Sycamore, 58–0. Following the game, the existence of Bishop Sycamore was questioned by fans and the school is accused of running a grift and duping ESPN into airing the game. Bishop Sycamore head coach Roy Johnson was fired following the game and an arrest warrant was issued towards him.

The stadium was planned to be the site of the Stagg Bowl in 2020 and 2021, hosted by the Ohio Athletic Conference. The 2020 edition was cancelled because of the COVID-19 pandemic. The 2021 edition was played on December 17, 2021.

The United States Football League played its inaugural 2022 postseason at Tom Benson Hall of Fame Stadium because of scheduling conflicts with the 2022 World Games at Legion Field and Protective Stadium. Semifinal games were played on June 25, while the championship game was played on July 3. On January 25, 2023, it was announced that the Pittsburgh Maulers and the New Jersey Generals would be playing their home games at the Tom Benson Hall of Fame Stadium. The 2023 USFL North Division playoff game and the USFL Championship Game will also be played in that stadium. Canton was the only host stadium not retained when the USFL merged with the XFL to form the United Football League, as both the Maulers and Generals were contracted and the UFL scheduled all of its games in their teams' nominal home cities; Hall of Fame Village officials made an aggressive effort to land the 2024 UFL championship game but lost out to The Dome at America's Center.

== Championship games hosted ==
| Game | League | Level | Years |
|---|---|---|---|
| Football State Championships | OHSAA | High school | 1991–2014; 2017–2019; 2021–present |
| Victory Bowl | NCCAA | College | 1997–2000 |
| Junior World Championship | IFAF | Amateur | 2009 |
| World Championship | IFAF | Amateur | 2015 |
| Championship Weekend | WFA | Women’s | 2021–present |
| Stagg Bowl | NCAA | College | 2021, 2025, 2028 |
| USFL championship game | USFL | Professional | 2022, 2023 |

== 2015–16 reconstruction ==
After the 2015 Pro Football Hall of Fame game concluded, demolition began on the stadium. The construction limited fan seating during the fall football season. The final phase of construction was scheduled to begin after the 2016 Hall of Fame Game. However, approximately an hour prior to kickoff, the game was cancelled due to poor field conditions caused by the use of improper paints applied to the field to create the Hall of Fame logo and other on-field graphics.

Events and tenants
| Preceded by first stadium | Home of the Victory Bowl; 1997–2000 | Succeeded by Ernest W. Spangler Stadium |
