= Antonio Hall =

American gridiron football player (born 1982)

No. 58
- Position: Offensive tackle

Personal information
- Born: March 28, 1982 (age 44); Canton, Ohio, U.S.
- Listed height: 6 ft 4 in (1.93 m)
- Listed weight: 303 lb (137 kg)

Career information
- High school: Canton McKinley
- College: Kentucky

Career history
- 2004: Indianapolis Colts*
- 2005: Saskatchewan Roughriders*
- 2006: Kentucky Horsemen
- 2006–2007: Saskatchewan Roughriders*
- 2008–2009: Calgary Stampeders
- 2009: Saskatchewan Roughriders
- 2010: Edmonton Eskimos
- * Offseason or practice squad member only

Awards and highlights
- Grey Cup champion (2008); 2× First-team All-SEC (2002, 2003); 2002 Sports Illustrated/CNN All-American HM; 2002 AFCA All American Good Works Team; 2000 Rivals.com All-American
- Stats at CFL.ca (archive)

Antonio Hall (born March 28, 1982) is an American former professional football offensive tackle. He was signed by the Indianapolis Colts as an undrafted free agent in 2004. He played college football at Kentucky, starting in 45 consecutive games. In high school, he was a starter on the 1997 USA Today National Championship team at Canton McKinley High School in Canton, Ohio.

Hall was also a member of the Kentucky Horsemen, Calgary Stampeders, Saskatchewan Roughriders, and the Edmonton Eskimos. During 2016, he was an assistant varsity football coach at Glenoak High School in Canton, Ohio. In 2017 and 2018, he was a varsity coach at Canton McKinley High School in Canton, Ohio. In 2019, Hall was the Defensive Coordinator and Assistant Athletic Director at St. Thomas Aquinas High School in Louisville, Ohio. He was the Athletic Director at Canton McKinley High School and the District Athletic Director for Canton City Schools. In 2026, he took over as head varsity football coach for the Solon City School District, and will be taking over as the Athletic Director in July of 2027.
