= Garland Rivers =

American football player (born 1964)

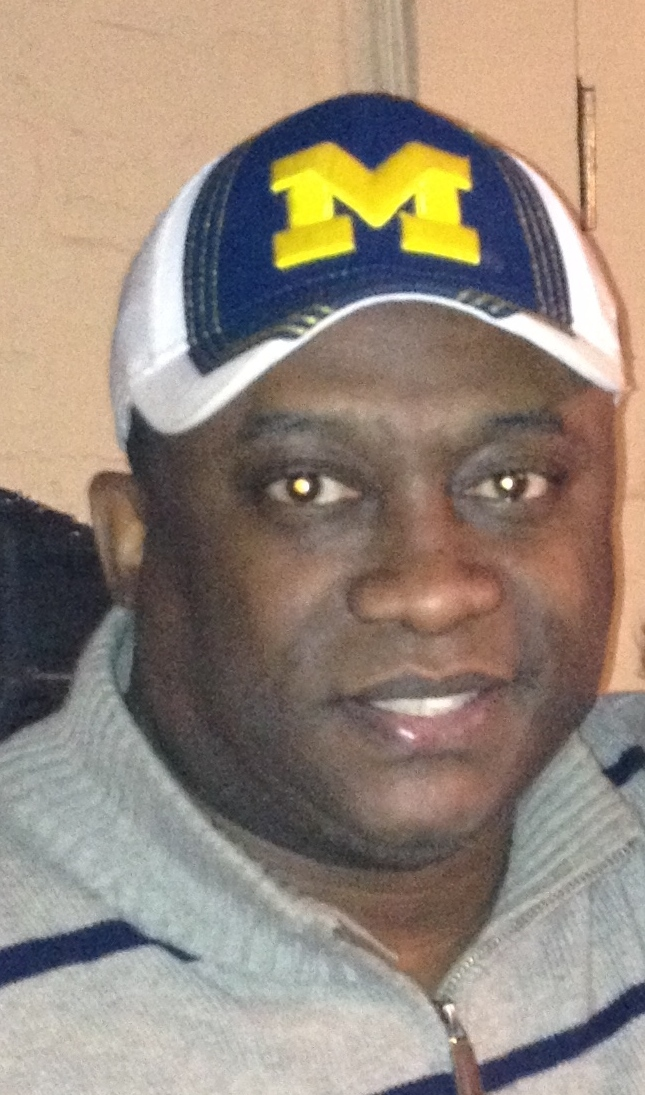

No. 32
- Position: Defensive back

Personal information
- Born: November 3, 1964 (age 62); Canton, Ohio, U.S.
- Listed height: 6 ft 1 in (1.85 m)
- Listed weight: 181 lb (82 kg)

Career information
- High school: McKinley (Canton, Ohio)
- College: Michigan
- NFL draft: 1987: 4th round, 92nd overall pick

Career history
- Detroit Lions (1987)*; Chicago Bears (1987); San Francisco 49ers (1988)*; New York Jets (1989)*; Albany Firebirds (1990–1991); Arizona Rattlers (1992–1993)
- * Offseason or practice squad member only

Awards and highlights
- Consensus All-American (1986); First-team All-Big Ten (1986); Second-team All-Big Ten (1985)
- Stats at Pro Football Reference

Garland A. Rivers (born November 3, 1964) is an American former professional football player who was a defensive back selected in the 1987 NFL draft by the Detroit Lions of the National Football League (NFL). He played briefly for the Chicago Bears in the 1987 NFL season after having starred as an All-American for the Michigan Wolverines football team for whom he set the single-game tackles record as a sophomore, which still stands. After returning to the University of Michigan to complete his bachelor's degree, he returned to professional football for several seasons in the Arena Football League (AFL). However, before returning to professional football he became embroiled in a scandal involving sports agents engaging amateur athletes.

== College career ==
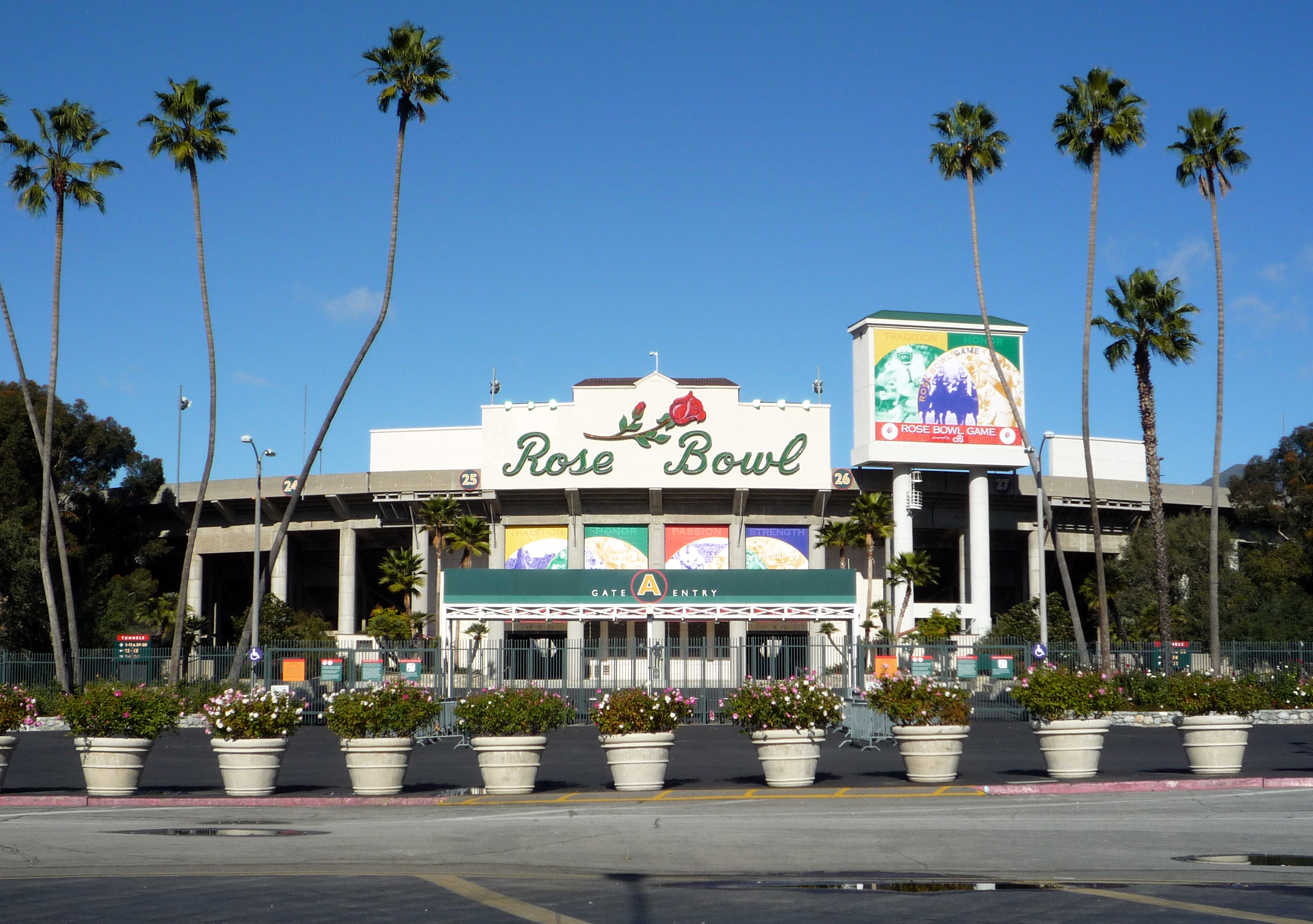
Rivers played in several bowl games, including the 1987 Rose Bowl.

After attending Canton McKinley High School, where they won the 1981 Ohio High School Athletic Association football championships, he went to the University of Michigan where he became the only freshman varsity letter winner on the football team in 1983. Rivers, who wore #13 as a Wolverine, started 32 consecutive games until a shoulder injury caused him to end the streak. He posted six interceptions in his Michigan career, including one for a touchdown. Another one during the same season was a game saving interception in the 1986 Fiesta Bowl in a 27–23 victory over the Nebraska Cornhuskers football team. Rivers started 12 of the 13 games his senior season for the Big Ten Conference champions and was one of three All-Americans (along with Jumbo Elliott & Jim Harbaugh) that season as the team went 11–2 and was invited to the Rose Bowl. Rivers once had 17 tackles and an assist as a sophomore defensive back in a game against the 1984 National Champion Brigham Young Cougars football team in the 1984 Holiday Bowl. 17 tackles continues to stand alone as a school single game record.

His college athletic career was not without controversy. He was named by Michigan Football coach and Michigan Wolverines athletic director Bo Schembechler as one of two players (the other being Robert Perryman) who had transgressed National Collegiate Athletic Association rules in violation of their amateur status. According to Schembechler, both players had signed contracts and accepted loans from agents before their college eligibility expired. Schembechler testified in a Federal District Court case involving charges of mail fraud and racketeering against Norby Walters and Lloyd Bloom. According to Schembechler, Rivers had denied having entered into an agreement before the team's 1986 NCAA Division I-A football season had ended in a meeting with him, but confessed in a Federal Bureau of Investigation meeting. Because the investigation occurred late in the Spring academic term at Michigan, River's athletic scholarship in the form tuition and room and board had already been fully paid by the university. However, when Rivers returned to Michigan in 1988 to complete his degree, the university did not provide a scholarship for which he would have otherwise been eligible.

== Professional career ==
Rivers was selected by the Detroit Lions of the National Football League with the eighth pick of the fourth round (92nd overall) of the 1987 NFL Draft. He played briefly for the Chicago Bears under Mike Ditka in 1987. The Bears went 11–4 that season and qualified for the 1987-88 NFL playoffs that season.

Garland Rivers played for several years in the Arena Football League as a wide receiver and linebacker. He mostly played on defense. He played for the Albany Firebirds for 1990 and 1991. The Firebirds qualified for the 4-team 1991 AFL playoffs as the #4 seed and lost to the #1 seed Detroit Drive in the first round. Then, he played for the Arizona Rattlers in 1992 and 1993. The Rattlers qualified for 8-team the 1993 AFL playoffs as the #4 seed and advanced to the second round before losing to the #1 seed Detroit Drive.

Rivers has coached at Timken, McKinley and GlenOak. As of 2012, he worked for Indian River School.

== Family ==
Rivers was inducted into the Stark High School Hall of Fame in 2012. His son Jewone Snow, by Linda Snow, is a form McKinley Bulldogs (class of 2010) football standout. Snow is the sister of Percy Snow and Eric Snow, who were also standout athletes for McKinley. Jewone went to college at West Virginia where he joined the football team. Rivers is the father of three sons and two daughters.
