= North Street School =

North Street School may refer to:

- North Street School, a primary school in Feilding, New Zealand
- North Street School, an elementary school in Greenwich, Connecticut, United States
- North Street School, a defunct elementary school in Claremont, New Hampshire, United States
- North Street School, an elementary school in Geneva City School District, New York, United States
- North Street School, a defunct elementary school in Orrville City School District, Ohio, United States
- North Street School, a defunct elementary school in New Castle Area School District, Pennsylvania, United States

== See also ==
- Upper North Street School, East London, United Kingdom
