= Josh McDaniels =

American football coach (born 1976)

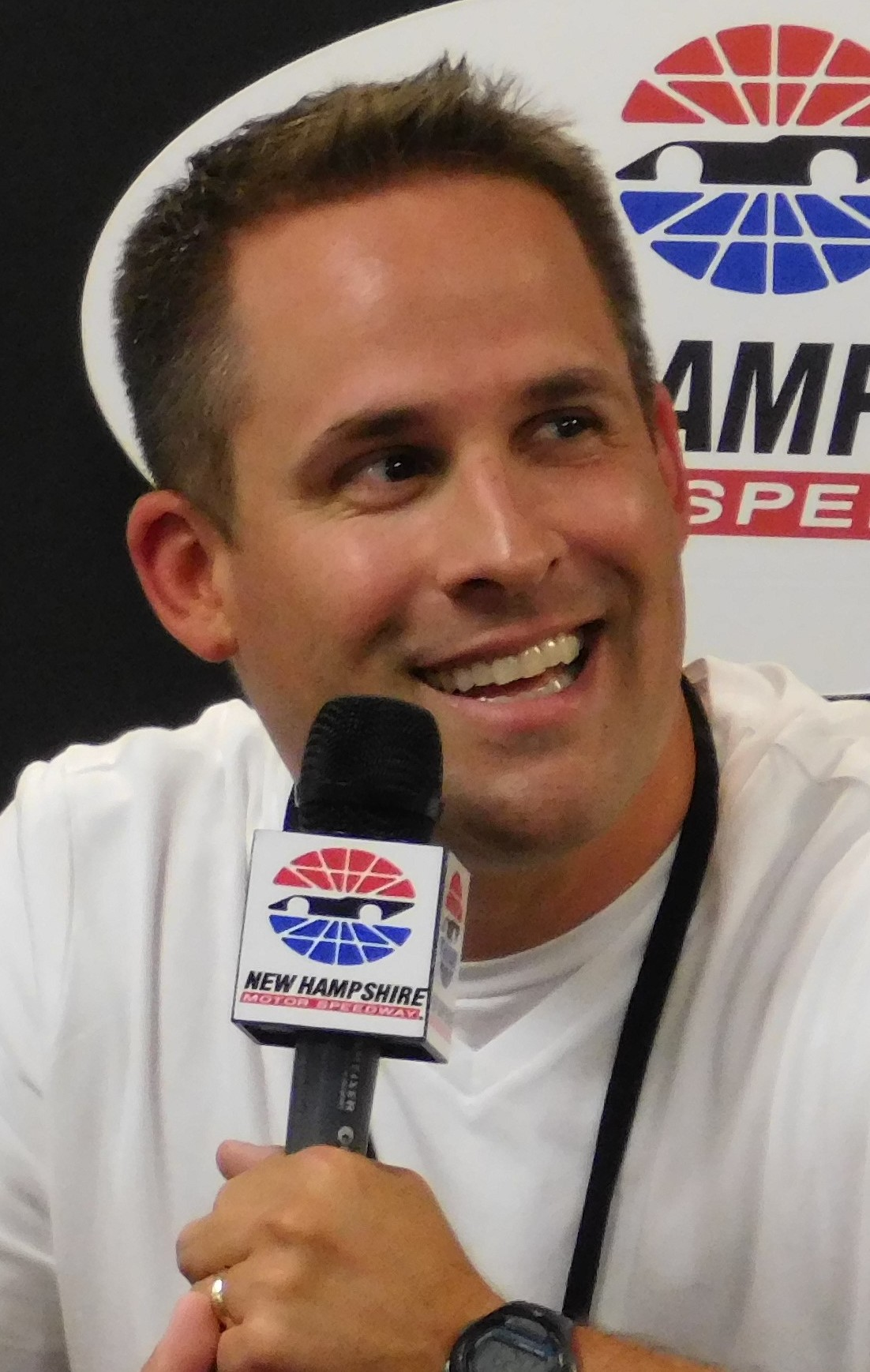
- McDaniels in 2017

New England Patriots
- Title: Offensive coordinator

Personal information
- Born: April 22, 1976 (age 50); Barberton, Ohio, U.S.

Career information
- Position: Wide receiver
- High school: Canton McKinley (OH)
- College: John Carroll (1995–1998)

Career history
- Michigan State (1999) Graduate assistant; New England Patriots (2001–2008); Personnel assistant (2001); Defensive assistant (2002–2003); Quarterbacks coach (2004–2005); Offensive coordinator & quarterbacks coach (2006–2008); Denver Broncos (2009–2010) Head coach; St. Louis Rams (2011) Offensive coordinator & quarterbacks coach; New England Patriots (2012–2021) Offensive coordinator & quarterbacks coach (Note: In 2020, Jedd Fisch took over as quarterbacks coach from McDaniels); Las Vegas Raiders (2022–2023) Head coach; New England Patriots (2025–present) Offensive coordinator

Awards and highlights
- 6× Super Bowl champion (XXXVI, XXXVIII, XXXIX, XLIX, LI, LIII); NFL Assistant Coach of the Year (2025)

Head coaching record
- Regular season: 20–33 (.377)
- Coaching profile at Pro Football Reference

Joshua Thomas McDaniels (born April 22, 1976) is an American professional football coach who is the offensive coordinator for the New England Patriots of the National Football League (NFL). He has served as the offensive coordinator of the Patriots for 14 non-consecutive seasons. Outside of his Patriots tenure, McDaniels was the head coach of the Denver Broncos from 2009 to 2010 and the Las Vegas Raiders from 2022 to 2023.

During McDaniels' first stint as New England's offensive coordinator from 2006 to 2008, the team set the season record for points scored and became the first team to win all 16 regular season games in 2007. In his second stint from 2012 to 2021, the Patriots won three Super Bowl titles. McDaniels rejoined New England a third time in 2025, winning AP NFL Assistant Coach of the Year the same season.

== Playing career ==
Recruited out of Ohio's Canton McKinley High School by Greg Debeljak, McDaniels attended John Carroll University, where he played football mostly as a wide receiver from 1995 to 1998. Although a quarterback in high school, McDaniels lost out at that position at John Carroll to Nick Caserio, who joined the Patriots staff in 2001 (the same year as McDaniels). His other teammates at John Carroll included London Fletcher, formerly a linebacker with the St. Louis Rams, Buffalo Bills, and Washington Redskins as well as Brian Polian, the former head coach at the University of Nevada-Reno, Jerry Schuplinski, the New York Giants quarterbacks coach, Tom Telesco, former general manager of the Las Vegas Raiders and Dave Ziegler, Telesco's predecessor as general manager of the Raiders.

== Coaching career ==
=== Michigan State ===
McDaniels began his coaching career as a senior graduate assistant at Michigan State University in 1999 under Nick Saban, parlaying his dad's friendship with Saban. After assisting Michigan State, McDaniels moved to Cleveland and worked as a plastics sales representative.

=== New England Patriots (first stint) ===
McDaniels joined the Patriots in 2001 as a personnel assistant. From 2002 to 2003, he served as a defensive coaching assistant for the team, working with the defensive backs in 2003. In 2004, McDaniels became the team's quarterbacks coach. In his first four seasons with the team, the Patriots won three Super Bowls: Super Bowl XXXVI, Super Bowl XXXVIII, and Super Bowl XXXIX. After offensive coordinator Charlie Weis left the team following the 2004 season, the Patriots did not name an offensive coordinator for the 2005 season. According to The New York Times in 2008, it was McDaniels who called the offensive plays for the 2005 season, although suggestions to that effect were made in 2005. After the season, McDaniels was officially promoted to offensive coordinator, while retaining his responsibilities coaching the team's quarterbacks.

In the 2007 season, with McDaniels at the helm of the offense, the Patriots set NFL records, scoring 75 touchdowns (67 on offense, 50 passing and 17 rushing) and 589 points, leading to rumors that McDaniels might leave the Patriots for a head coaching job. However, McDaniels withdrew his name from consideration during the Patriots' January 2008 playoff run. Shortly after the Patriots' loss in Super Bowl XLII, Patriots head coach Bill Belichick gave McDaniels a five-page typed report on what it takes to be an effective head coach and run a winning organization, which McDaniels termed "his bible." Throughout the 2008 season, the two met to discuss the report and allow McDaniels to ask non-coaching questions that he brought to later head coaching interviews.

Starting quarterback Tom Brady suffered a season-ending injury in Week 1 of the 2008 season. McDaniels directed the Matt Cassel-led Patriots' offense as the team finished the season with an 11–5 record but missed out on the playoffs.

=== Denver Broncos ===
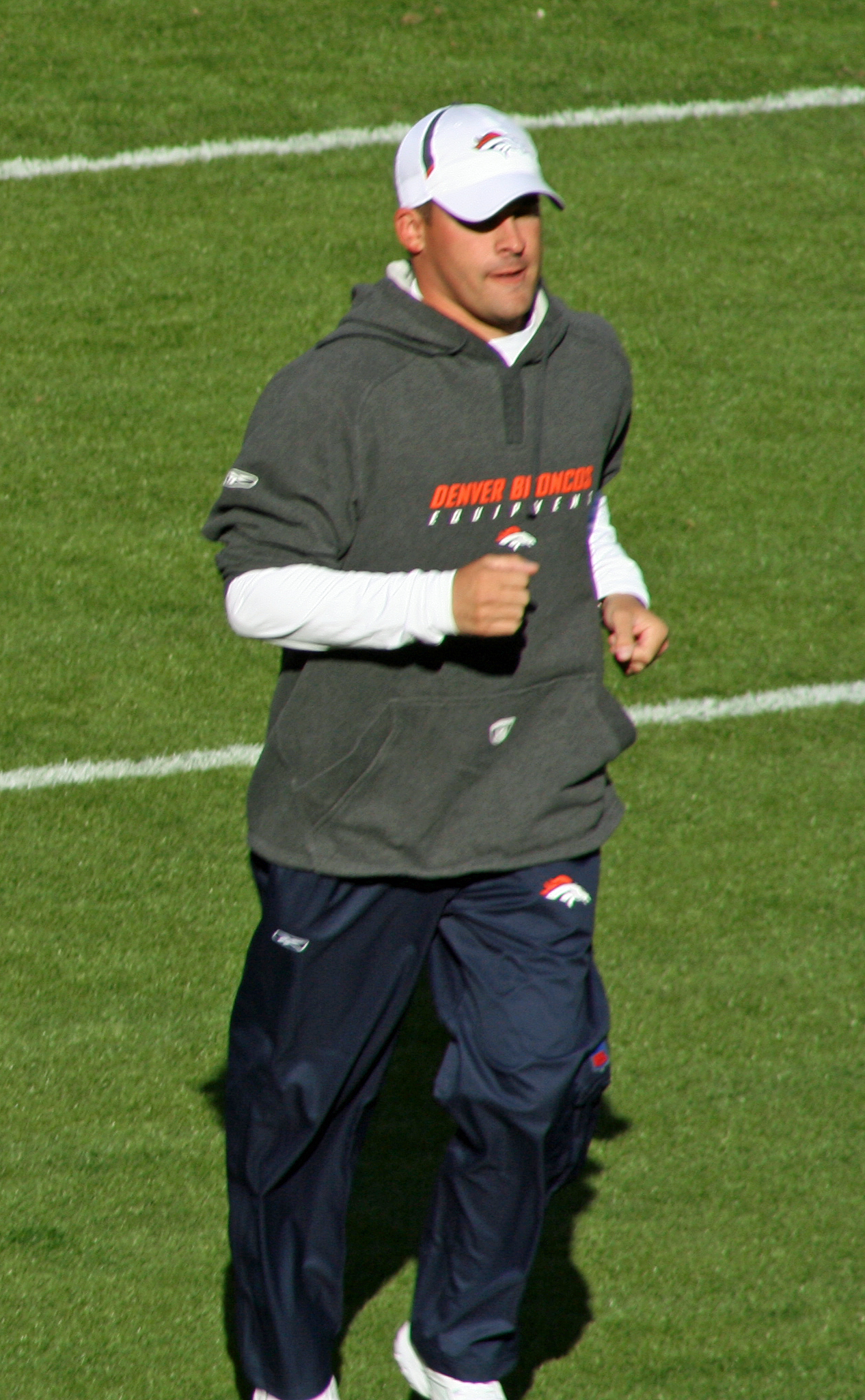
McDaniels in 2009

On January 11, 2009, the Denver Broncos named McDaniels their head coach, replacing Mike Shanahan. The Broncos introduced McDaniels, who agreed to sign a four-year, $8 million contract, as their head coach in a press conference the next day.

McDaniels's tenure with the Broncos was marred early on by a controversy involving an alleged trade offer from the Patriots involving Broncos quarterback, Jay Cutler, which would have sent Matt Cassel to Denver. On March 9, 2009, according to ESPN, a conference call involving McDaniels, team owner Pat Bowlen and Cutler failed to resolve the issues. Cutler said he did not trust McDaniels and the organization following the trade controversy. On April 2, 2009, the Broncos traded Cutler and a 2009 fifth-round draft pick to the Chicago Bears for quarterback Kyle Orton, first- and third-round picks in 2009 and a first-round pick in 2010.

==== 2009 season ====
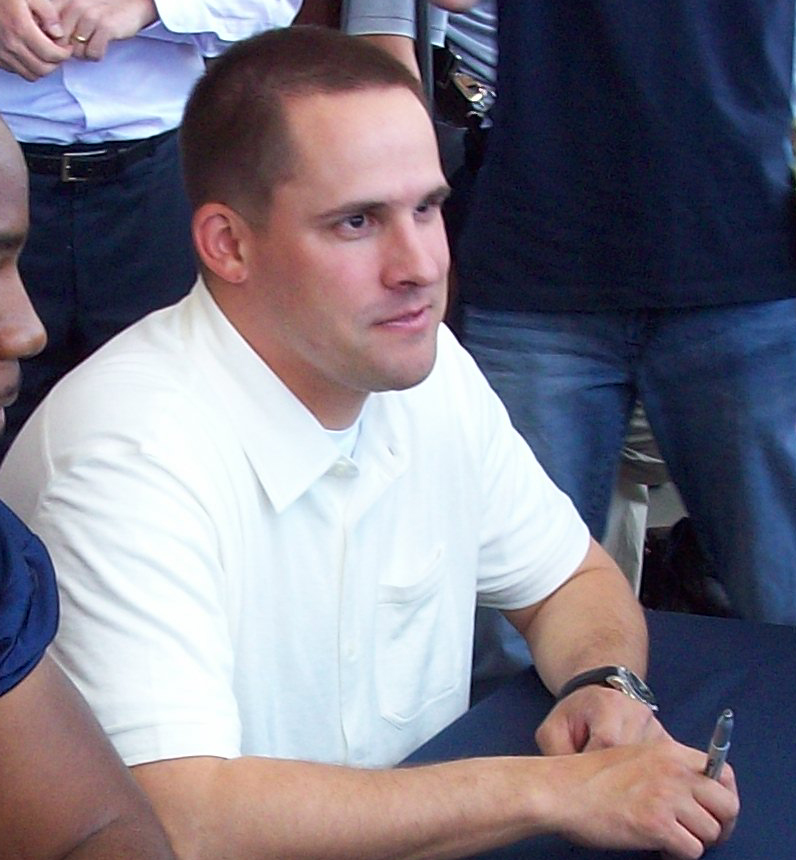
McDaniels in 2009

The Broncos started their first season under McDaniels with six straight wins, including an overtime victory over the Patriots in Week 5, before suffering four straight losses. In the last game of the season, McDaniels and the Broncos still had a potential playoff berth on the line, but lost to the Kansas City Chiefs, 44–24, Denver's third straight home loss to a division opponent. That left the Broncos with an 8–8 season record. Controversy surrounded McDaniels for his benching of Pro Bowl wide receiver Brandon Marshall for the game due to disciplinary reasons; Marshall would be traded to the Miami Dolphins after the season.

==== 2010 season ====
McDaniels' second season in Denver ended with a 3–9 record. The Broncos lost to the Kansas City Chiefs on December 5, and McDaniels was fired by the Broncos the following day.

==== Videotaping scandal ====
On November 27, 2010, The Denver Post reported the Broncos were under investigation from the NFL, after it was reported that Steve Scarnecchia, the team's director of video operations hired by McDaniels in 2009, videotaped a San Francisco 49ers' walkthrough practice, during the teams' Week 8 game at Wembley Stadium in London, England.

The same day, the NFL fined the Broncos and McDaniels $50,000 each, and Scarnecchia was fired as a result of the incident. Scarnecchia told NFL investigators he acted alone and "knew it was wrong" to tape the walkthrough practice, after the rest of the Broncos' staff had left the stadium. Scarnecchia later presented McDaniels with the six-minute video, but McDaniels declined to view it, and it was not shown to any other Broncos staff member, and therefore the NFL determined the Broncos had not gained a competitive advantage from it. An anonymous source alerted the Broncos on November 8, who conducted an internal investigation before alerting the NFL. NFL Security then began its investigation, which included a forensic analysis of the computer from which the recording was later deleted by Scarnecchia. Both the NFL and the Broncos determined that McDaniels knew nothing about the incident.

However, the NFL fined McDaniels due to the fact that he did not immediately report the incident to the league office, as required by policy. The NFL also fined the Broncos, as "clubs are ultimately accountable for the conduct of their employees."

McDaniels later issued the following statement:

"I apologize for not promptly reporting the improper conduct of our video director before our game against the 49ers in London. The actions of this individual are in no way representative of the values and integrity held by myself, our players and coaches, and the entire Denver Broncos organization. I understand the punishment from the National Football League and support its commitment to the integrity of the game. We have addressed the situation internally to assure that nothing like this happens again."

According to The Denver Post, the videotaping incident was a major factor in McDaniels' firing a week later; while the Broncos did not deem it something that merited being fired for cause, they considered his failure to report the incident "unforgivable."

=== St. Louis Rams ===
On January 18, 2011, McDaniels agreed to become the offensive coordinator for the St. Louis Rams under head coach Steve Spagnuolo. In Super Bowl XLII, Spagnuolo was the defensive coordinator of the New York Giants, while McDaniels was the offensive coordinator of the Patriots. Spagnuolo stated, "I've always recognized that he is one of the top offensive minds in the NFL. We think he is a great addition to our organization." Also, during the same news conference, it was announced McDaniels would have no hand in any personnel decisions. In McDaniels' lone season in St. Louis, the Rams finished with a 2–14 record and a fourth-place finish in the NFC West.

=== New England Patriots (second stint) ===
Following the 2011 season, the Rams fired Spagnuolo as head coach. While McDaniels was under contract for the 2012 season, the Rams informed him that they would not hold him to his contract, and would allow McDaniels to leave. The Patriots then hired him to act as an offensive assistant coach during their 2011 playoffs, and to replace Bill O'Brien as offensive coordinator/quarterbacks coach for the 2012 season. O'Brien left the Patriots after the 2011 season ended to become head coach at Penn State, but maintained play calling duties through Super Bowl XLVI.

During the 2014 season, McDaniels was a part of another championship for the Patriots, winning Super Bowl XLIX against the Seattle Seahawks despite a 10-point deficit in the fourth quarter. During the 2016 season, McDaniels coached the offense in another Patriots championship season, this time winning Super Bowl LI against the Atlanta Falcons. In the game, the Patriots defeated the Falcons by a score of 34–28 in overtime, this time coming from a 25-point deficit. The Patriots scored only nine points in the first three quarters, but overcame a 28–3 third quarter deficit to tie the game in the last minute and win in overtime.

Two days after Super Bowl LII where the Patriots lost 41–33 to the Philadelphia Eagles, on February 6, 2018, McDaniels was announced as the new head coach of the Indianapolis Colts. However, he withdrew from the position on the same day and announced that he had decided to stay with the Patriots. In response, McDaniels' long-time agent, Bob LaMonte, terminated his representation of McDaniels. The Patriots went on to win Super Bowl LIII in 2018, earning McDaniels his third championship as offensive coordinator. From 2012 until his hire in Las Vegas, McDaniels was both offensive coordinator and quarterbacks coach for every year in his second stint with the Patriots, except for 2020, when Jedd Fisch was hired as quarterbacks coach.

=== Las Vegas Raiders ===
On January 31, 2022, McDaniels was hired as the head coach of the Las Vegas Raiders, signing a six-year contract. His first win with the Raiders was a 32–23 victory over his former team, the Denver Broncos, in Week 4.

Throughout the 2022 season, McDaniels was criticized for his team's inability to hold leads and close out games. He received criticism for Las Vegas's Week 10 loss to an Indianapolis Colts team led by the debuting interim head coach Jeff Saturday, who was hired earlier that week to replace the recently dismissed Frank Reich despite having no previous NFL coaching experience heading into the game. Despite the team's performance in that game, Raiders owner Mark Davis expressed his support for McDaniels the next day. Los Angeles Times sportswriter Bill Plaschke suggested in a report that Davis was allowing McDaniels to remain the head coach not because of the team's performance, but because the owner did not have enough cash on hand to pay his coach a sizable severance package. McDaniels' first year with the Raiders ended with a 6–11 record and the departure of long-time quarterback Derek Carr.

Before the 2023 season, Jimmy Garoppolo was signed as the Raiders starting quarterback on a three-year, $72.5 million contract, based on his past work with McDaniels when they were both with the New England Patriots. However Garoppolo was still recovering from an injured foot, so the deal was contingent upon passing a physical prior to Week 1 (which he did) as otherwise the Raiders could have released him without owing compensation. On September 24, 2023, during a game against the Pittsburgh Steelers, McDaniels came under intense criticism for kicking a field goal down by eight points with just over two minutes remaining in the game. Though the field goal was successful, the Raiders did not get another reasonable chance to score and they lost by a final score of 23–18. He then came under even more scrutiny for saying it was a two possession game. McDaniels, along with General Manager Dave Ziegler, were fired from the Raiders on October 31, 2023, after a 3–5 start to the season. McDaniels found out about him being fired while his kids were out trick-or-treating on Halloween. He decided to call his kids to tell them to come home so he could tell them the news. McDaniels finished his Raiders tenure with a 9–16 record, and his contract, reportedly worth $60 million, is fully guaranteed through 2027. Following his firing, the NFLPA ranked McDaniels as the lowest rated head coach in the league for 2023.

=== New England Patriots (third stint) ===
On January 22, 2025, McDaniels was brought back to the Patriots to be their offensive coordinator under new head coach Mike Vrabel. Under McDaniels' playcalling in the 2025 season, the Patriots were the second best scoring offense in the league with the average of 28.8 points per game, improving from the previous season, where they placed in the bottom three with 16.1 points per game under Alex Van Pelt. McDaniels was also credited for the development of second-year quarterback Drake Maye. With the improvement in the Patriots offense and Maye's development into an MVP candidate, McDaniels was awarded with the 2025 AP NFL Assistant Coach of the Year.

== Head coaching record ==
Team	Year	Regular season					Postseason			
Team	Year	Won	Lost	Ties	Win %	Finish	Won	Lost	Win %	Result
DEN	2009	8	8	0	.500	2nd in AFC West	—	—	—	—
DEN	2010	3	9	0	.250	Fired	—	—	—	—
DEN total		11	17	0	.393		0	0	.000	
LV	2022	6	11	0	.353	3rd in AFC West	—	—	—	—
LV	2023	3	5	0	.375	Fired	—	—	—	—
LV total		9	16	0	.360		0	0	.000	
Total		20	33	0	.377		0	0	.000	

== Personal life ==
McDaniels is the son of Thom McDaniels, who was voted the 1997 USA Today High School Coach of the Year in the state of Ohio. Attending his father's practices during his youth has been credited with inspiring McDaniels to enter coaching. McDaniels' brother, Ben McDaniels, is an assistant coach for the Houston Texans.

McDaniels and his wife have four children.
