= Ben McDaniels =

American football coach (born 1980)

Houston Texans
- Title: Wide receivers coach & Passing game coordinator

Personal information
- Born: June 6, 1980 (age 46); Barberton, Ohio, U.S.

Career information
- Position: Quarterback
- College: Kent State

Career history
- Warren G. Harding (OH) HS (2003) Wide receivers coach; Minnesota (2004–2005) Graduate assistant; Canton McKinley (OH) HS (2006–2007) Quarterbacks coach; Jackson (OH) HS (2008) Quarterbacks coach; Denver Broncos (2009–2010); Offensive assistant (2009); Quarterbacks coach (2010); Columbia (2012) Offensive coordinator & quarterbacks coach; Tampa Bay Buccaneers (2012–2013) Offensive assistant; Rutgers (2014–2015); Wide receivers coach (2014); Offensive coordinator & quarterbacks coach (2015); Chicago Bears (2016–2017) Offensive assistant; Michigan (2018–2020); Offensive analyst (2018); Quarterbacks coach (2019–2020); Houston Texans (2021–present); Assistant wide receivers coach (2021); Wide receivers coach & passing game coordinator (2022–present)

Benjamin McDaniels (born June 6, 1980) is an American professional football coach who is the wide receivers coach and passing game coordinator for the Houston Texans of the National Football League (NFL). He previously served as the quarterbacks coach for the University of Michigan and also previously serving as the interim wide receivers coach in late 2018. McDaniels previously served as the wide receivers coach for the Rutgers Scarlet Knights football team before being promoted to offensive coordinator after Ralph Friedgen decided to step down as after the season. McDaniels served as quarterback assistant with the Denver Broncos in 2010. He played collegiately as a quarterback at Kent State from 2000 to 2001.

== Coaching career ==
McDaniels began his coaching career in 2003 as wide receivers coach at Warren G. Harding High School in Warren, Ohio. He then spent the next two years as a graduate assistant coach under head coach Glen Mason at the University of Minnesota.

McDaniels was named offensive coordinator and quarterbacks coach at Columbia University by head coach Pete Mangurian on December 29, 2011 but left for a position with the Tampa Bay Buccaneers less than two months later.

On February 12, 2016, McDaniels joined the Chicago Bears as an offensive quality control coach.

McDaniels returned to college football in 2018, joining the Michigan staff as an offensive analyst on the staff of head coach Jim Harbaugh. On December 3, 2018, McDaniels was named wide receivers coach for Michigan's game against Florida in the 2018 Peach Bowl. He took over the duties from Jim McElwain, who had recently assumed the head coaching position at Central Michigan. On February 5, 2019, McDaniels was named Michigan's quarterbacks coach for the 2019 season.

On March 10, 2021, McDaniels joined the Houston Texans as their assistant wide receivers coach and offensive assistant. On February 21, 2022, McDaniels was promoted to wide receivers coach and passing game coordinator.

== Personal life ==
McDaniels is the son of Thom McDaniels (the 1997 USA Today High School Coach of the Year and often described as a "legend" of Ohio high school football). He is the younger brother of former Denver Broncos and Las Vegas Raiders head coach Josh McDaniels.

McDaniels received a bachelor's degree in sport management from Kent State University and a master's degree in sport management from the University of Minnesota.
