= Heritage Christian School (Canton, Ohio) =

Coordinates: 40°47′50″N 81°23′50″W

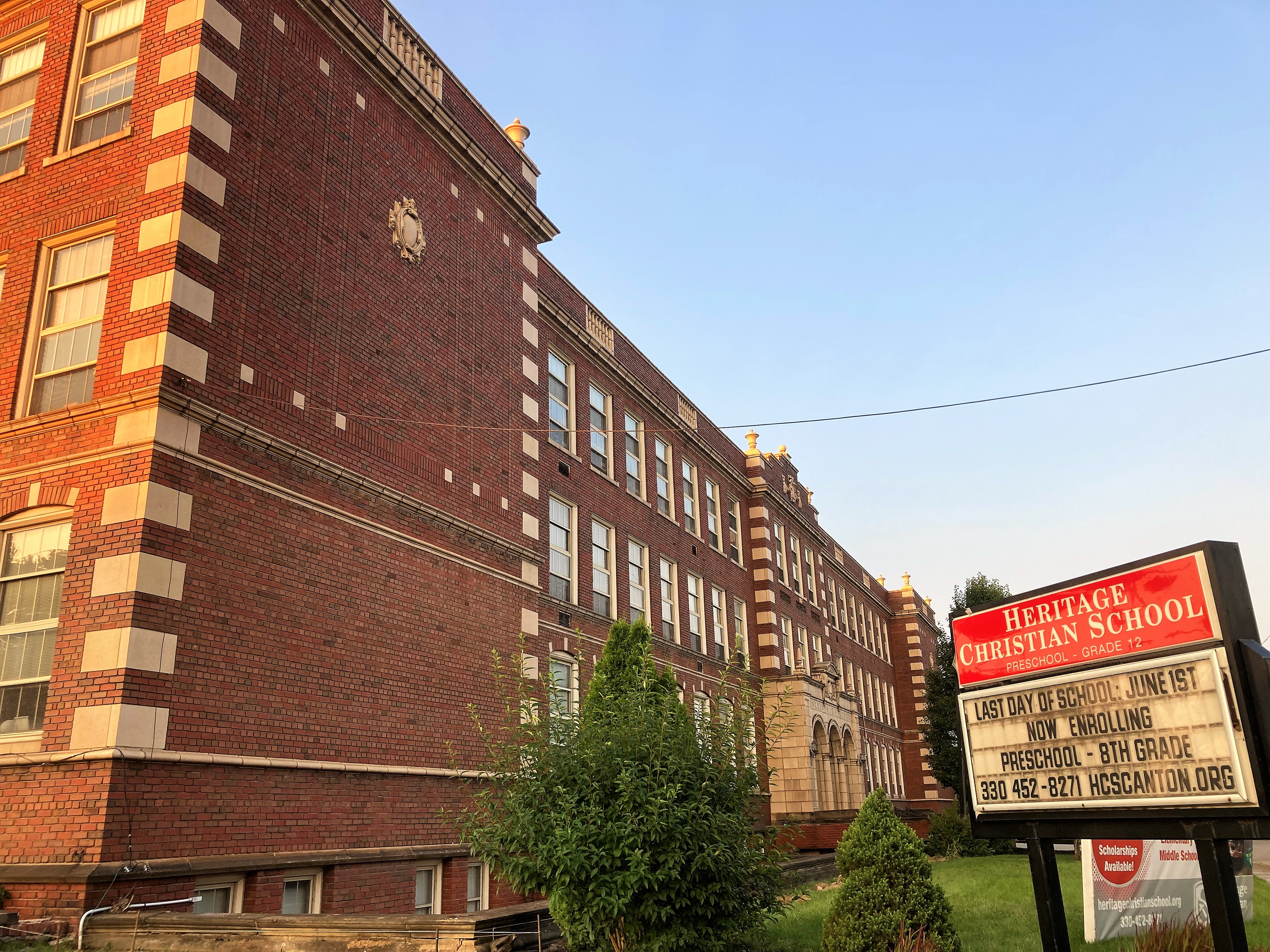

Location
- 2107 6th Street SW; Canton, Stark County, Ohio 44706; United States

Information
- Type: Private
- Religious affiliation: Christian
- Denomination: Nondenominational
- Established: 1968
- Founder: William Vimont
- Locale: Small city
- Authority: Ohio Department of Education
- Superintendent: Sharla Elton
- NCES School ID: 01063263
- Principal: Cindy Hernandez
- Teaching staff: ~25
- Grades: Preschool–8
- Enrollment: ~300
- Color
- Mascot: The Conqueror
- Website: www.heritagechristianschool.org

Heritage Christian School is a private, nondenominational Christian school located in Canton, Ohio. The school occupies what was formerly Lincoln High School and serves children from preschool to 8th grade. Previously, the middle and high school, sixth to 12th grade at Heritage Christian had their sports teams nicknamed the "Conquerors." The middle and high school closed in September 2018.

== Notable former students ==
- Marilyn Manson, rock musician.
- Matt Hoopes, Relient K guitarist.
