= Len Fontes =

American football coach (1938–1992)

Personal information
- Born: March 8, 1938; New Bedford, Massachusetts, U.S.
- Died: May 8, 1992 (aged 54); Rochester Hills, Michigan, U.S.

Career information
- College: Ohio State (1956–1959)

Career history
- Canton (OH) McKinley HS (def. assistant); Eastern Michigan (1968) Graduate assistant; Dayton (1969–1971) Defensive backs coach; Navy (1973–1976) Defensive backs coach; Miami (1977–1979) Defensive backs coach; Cleveland Browns (1980–1982) Defensive backs coach; New York Giants (1983–1988) Defensive backs coach; Detroit Lions (1990–1991) Defensive backfield coach

Awards and highlights
- Super Bowl champion (XXI)

Leonard J. Fontes (March 8, 1938 – May 8, 1992) was an American football coach. He served as an assistant coach for the Cleveland Browns, New York Giants and Detroit Lions.

Older brother of former NFL coach Wayne Fontes, He died of a heart attack on May 8, 1992, in Rochester Hills, Michigan at age 54.
