= Old McKinley High School =

- U.S. National Register of Historic Places
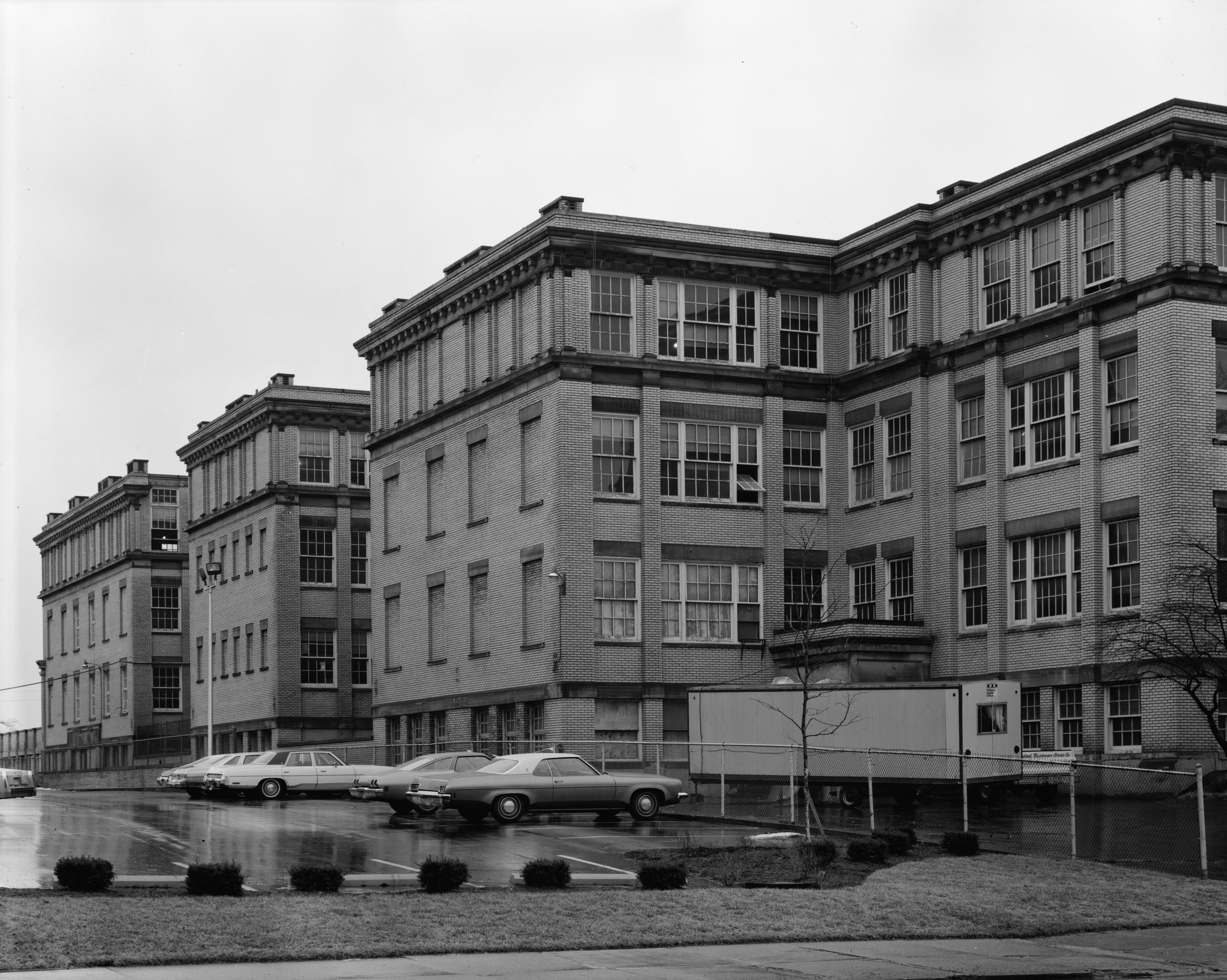
- c. 1984

- Location within Ohio Location within the United States
- Location: 800 N. Market St., Canton, Ohio
- Coordinates: 40°48′13″N 81°22′20″W
- Area: less than one acre
- Built: 1916
- Architect: Hammond, George F.
- Architectural style: Neo Classical
- NRHP reference No.: 82003649
- Added to NRHP: June 30, 1982

The Old McKinley High School is a former high school in Canton, Ohio, built in 1916. It was named for Anna McKinley, the sister of President William McKinley and a Canton teacher for 30 years. The building was first occupied in 1918 with an enrollment of 877. It was listed on the National Register of Historic Places in 1982.

The school was replaced by the current Canton McKinley High School at 17th St. NW. The old school is now a health care center.
