= Thom McDaniels =

Former American football coach (born 1949)

Biographical details
- Born: July 27, 1949 (age 77); Hornell, New York

Coaching career (HC unless noted)
- 1982–2015: Orrville (1972–1975) assistant coach; Orrville (1978–1980) assistant coach; Canton McKinley (1982–1997); Warren G. Harding (2000–2006); Massillon Jackson (2007–2008); Solon High School (2009) assistant coach; Massillon (2010–2013) assistant coach; Canton McKinley (2014); Canton McKinley (2024–2025) assistant coach

Head coaching record
- Overall: 216–84

Accomplishments and honors

Championships
- OHSAA Division I State Champion (1997); USA Today National Champion (1997)

Awards
- USA Today Coach of the Year (1997); Nike National Football Coach of the Year (1997); OHSAA Division I co-Coach of the Year (1997); Ohio Coach of the Year (2001)

Thom McDaniels is a former Ohio high school football coach. McDaniels has coached several high division programs within his 40-year career, such as Orrville, Solon, Massillon, Warren G. Harding, Canton McKinley and Jackson. McDaniels was named the National High School Football Coach of the Year in 1997 by USA Today. McDaniels is the father to New England Patriots offensive coordinator Josh McDaniels and Houston Texans offensive assistant Ben McDaniels.

== Personal life ==
McDaniels was born July 27, 1949, in Hornell, New York. McDaniels graduated from Orrville High School. McDaniels is the father of New England Patriots offensive coordinator Josh McDaniels and Houston Texans offensive assistant Ben McDaniels.

== Coaching career ==
=== Early career ===
Thom McDaniels began his coaching career in 1972, coaching for his alma mater Orrville High School under then head coach Mo Tipton. McDaniels later left the program in 1975, and returned in 1978, before leaving again in 1980.

=== Canton McKinley (first stint) ===
McDaniels began his head coaching career in 1982, taking over for the Canton McKinley Bulldogs. In McDaniels first year with the Bulldogs, they finished the regular season at 8–2, with notable victories of Cleveland St. Ignatius and Canton GlenOak. In the 1982 season, their only two losses came at the hands of Cincinnati Archbishop Moeller 43–10 and Massillon 7–0, averaging 18.5 points per game on the season, while only allowing 9.6 points per game.

Just two years later in 1985, McDaniels for the first time under his tenure at Canton, took the Bulldogs to the playoffs. Finishing the regular season with a 9–1 record, defeating top level programs such as Massillon, Austintown Fitch, Canton Central Catholic and others. McDaniels Bulldogs team, made it all the way to the state championship game, defeating GlenOak, Walsh Jesuit, and Villa Angela-St. Joseph along the way, before being defeated by Archbishop Moeller 35–11.

McDaniels took the Bulldogs through deep playoff runs throughout the 1990s. His most notable season came in 1997. The Bulldogs finished the regular season 10–0, defeating tough programs such as GlenOak, Massillon Jackson, Canton Central Catholic, Warren G. Harding, and Massillon. The Bulldogs that season defeated Hoover, St. Francis DeSales, St. Ignatius, and to cap off an already illustrious season the Bulldogs defeated Archbishop Moeller, to win their first OHSAA state championship in football since 1981, and the first and only state championship of McDaniels career. The Bulldogs broke numerous school records that season, including most points scored in a season (592) and games won in a season (14). McDaniels Bulldogs team was declared USA Today's national champions, and McDaniels was named to several coaching honors such as USA Today's coach of the year, Columbus Touchdown Clubs Coach of the year, co-Coach of the Year, and as well as the Nike National Coach of the Year. McDaniels stepped down as the Bulldogs head coach after 15 years, leaving behind a 134–42 record in those 15 years.

=== Warren G. Harding ===
McDaniels was hired as Warren G. Harding High School's head football coach in 2000. In McDaniels first season as the new Raiders head coach, he led them to a 7–3 record, with McDaniels defeating Cincinnati Elder, and a victory over his former Canton McKinley Bulldogs, while losing to former post-season rival Archbishop Moeller, as well as Boardman and eventual state champion Ursuline.

In the 2001 season, McDaniels Raider team delivered a 11–2 season, with multiple 50+ point defeats, such as defeating Archbishop Moeller 55–0, and M.M. Robinson from Ontario, Canada 71–0, which in that game Ivan Carmichael broke the Raiders record for longest interception return in school history (90 yards), along with Cleveland South 76–0, another record setting game with former Ohio State running back Maurice Clarett, setting the school record for most punt return touchdowns in a game with 2. The Raiders defeated Boardman in the playoffs 16–7 and St. Edward 42–26, another record setting game for Clarett, with over 400 yards rushing and 5 touchdowns, mostly done in the first half. before losing to St. Ignatious, who went on to win the state championship 40–33. McDaniels was named the Ohio Coach of the Year that season.

McDaniels best season with the Raiders came in 2002, finishing the regular season with a 10–0 record, and cruising to the OHSAA Division I state championship game, defeating St. Ignatius, St. Edwards, Mentor and Massillon along the way, before losing to Elder 21–19.

McDaniels and Harding continued their winning ways in their 2003 campaign, opening the season with two 60+ point victories over Cleveland South and Cleveland John F. Kennedy. The Raiders defeated tough opponents such as Buchtel 21–6, Cardinal Mooney 21–19, St. Edwards in overtime 27–20, and Massillon 31–15. The Raiders finished the regular season 10–0, finishing first in the OHSAA rankings. The Raiders defeated Solon in the first round 49–7, before losing to a rematch with St. Edwards 21–13. The Raiders Mario Manningham was awarded an All-Ohio selection that season.

McDaniels had led the Raiders to the playoffs in 4 out of 5 seasons during his tenure at Harding. In McDaniels final season at Harding, he led them to a 7–3 record, defeating Brecksville-Broadview Heights and St. Edwards in the playoffs, before losing to Mentor 34–24. McDaniels resigned after the season, with McDaniels being named an NFL high school coach of the year finalist in 2004.

=== Massillon Jackson ===
In 2007, McDaniels took the job to become Massillon Jacksons next head coach. In his first season, the Polar Bears finished at 4–6, missing the playoffs, with all 4 wins coming from programs with less than 3 wins, including a win over his former Bulldogs team. A step up from the 2007 season, in 2008, the Polar Bears finished 5–5. McDaniels stepped down after the 2008 season.

=== Later coaching career ===
Following McDaniels resignation at Jackson, he later coached at Solon High School as an assistant coach in 2009 and later at Massillon from 2010–2013.

=== Return to McKinley ===
McDaniels was rehired as McKinley's head football coach in March 2014, with a challenging re-entry to the head coaching scene, his final season as a head coach for the Bulldogs ended with a 3–7 regular season record. McDaniels stepped down soon after the season. Following a long hiatus, he returned as an assistant in 2024. In October 2025, McDaniels announced he would be retiring from coaching after a long career, finishing his career with 216 wins and 84 losses at several programs.

=== Hall of Fame honors ===
McDaniels was inducted into several different Hall of Fames, including the Ohio High School Coaches Association Hall of Fame, Stark County High School Football Hall of Fame in 2022, Wayne County Hall of Fame in 2008, Trumbull County Sports Hall of Fame, Warren Sports Hall of Fame in 2016 and most notably the National High School Football Hall of Fame in 2023.

=== Notable players ===
McDaniels coached several notable players including Percy Snow, Mike Doss, Maurice Clarett, and Mario Manningham.
