= Orrville High School =

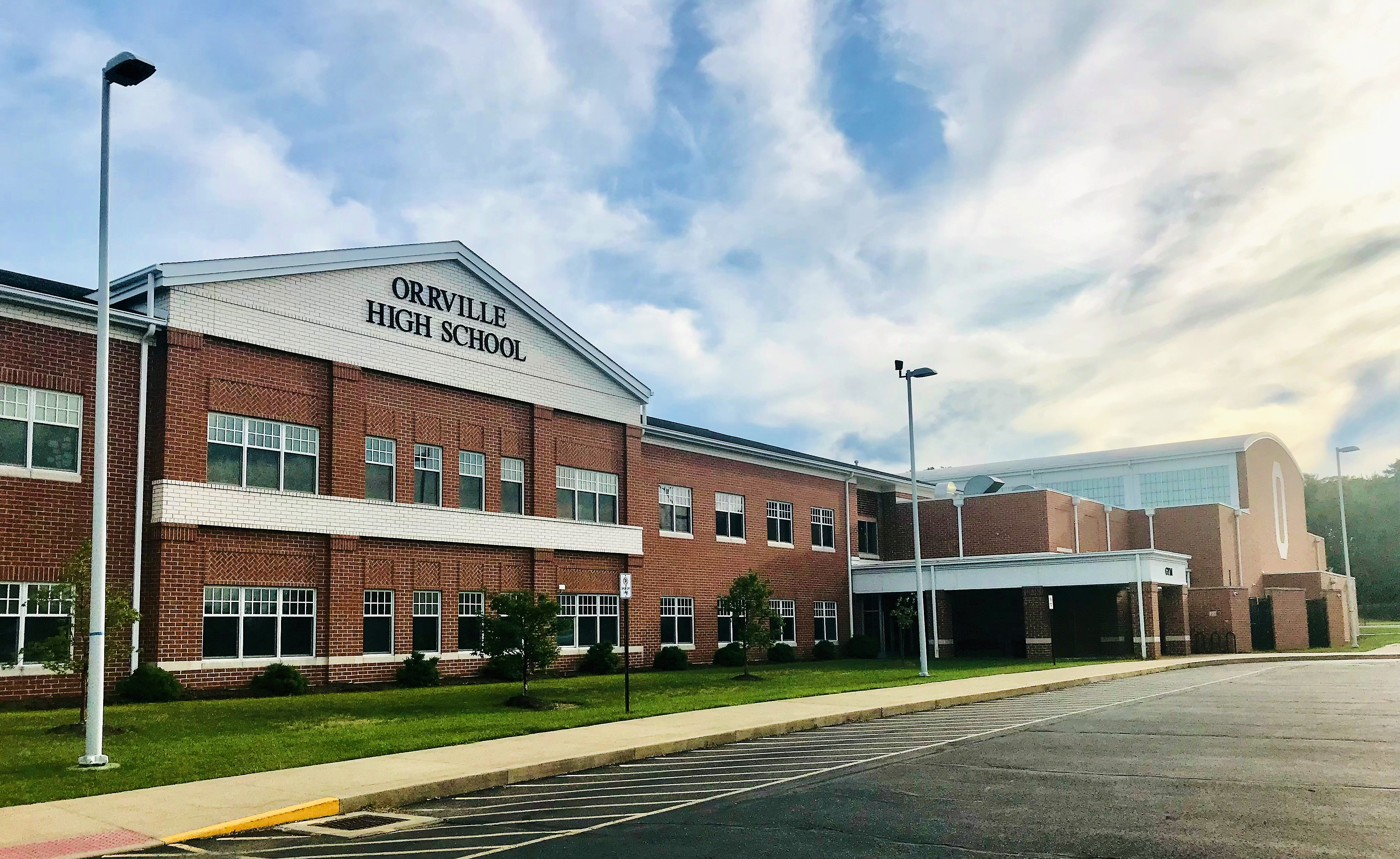

Location
- 841 North Ella Street; Orrville, Ohio 44667; United States
- Coordinates: 40°50′53″N 81°46′14″W

Information
- Type: Public, Co-Ed
- Established: 1880
- School district: Orrville City Schools
- Superintendent: Dr. David Toth
- Teaching staff: 24.45 (FTE)
- Grades: 9-12
- Average class size: 100
- Student to teacher ratio: 17.67
- Language: English
- Colors: Red, White
- Athletics conference: Principals Athletic Conference
- Team name: Red Riders
- Yearbook: Memories
- Website: www.orrville.k12.oh.us

Orrville High School is a public high school in Orrville, Ohio. It is the only high school in the Orrville City School District. Athletic teams are known as the Red Riders, and they compete in the Ohio High School Athletic Association as a member of the Principals Athletic Conference.

== Athletics ==
Orrville's football rivalry with the Wooster High School Generals is the oldest rivalry in Wayne County, having first met back in 1903. After the 2014 season, the teams had met 104 times.

=== State championships ===
- Football – 1998, 2018
- Boys basketball – 1992, 1995, 1996
- Boys track and field – 1999
- Girls volleyball – 2003

== Notable alumni and faculty ==
- Mike Birkbeck, former professional baseball pitcher in the Major League Baseball (MLB)
- Bob Knight, former college basketball coach
- Thom McDaniels, former high school football coach
- John R. Massaro, 8th Sergeant Major of the Marine Corps
- Joe Sedelmaier, former director and producer of television commercials
- Mark Smucker, CEO of The J.M. Smucker Company (class of 1988)
