= Lehman High School (Canton, Ohio) =

John H. Lehman High School
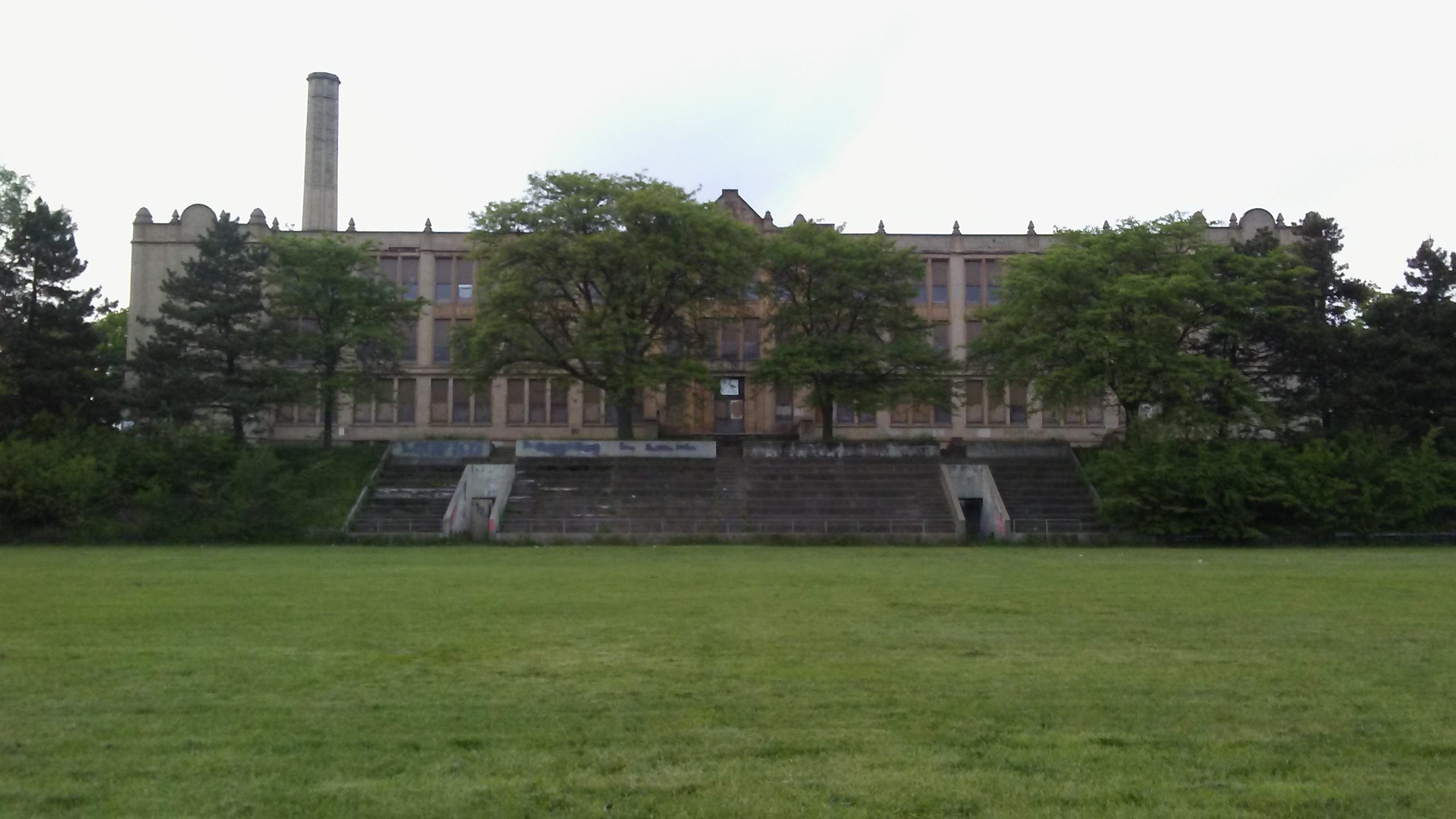

Location
- 1103 14th St. NW; Canton, Stark Co., Ohio 44703; United States; 40°48′51″N 81°22′59″W

Information
- Type: Public School
- Established: 1932
- Closed: 1976
- Grades: 9–12
- Colors: Scarlet & Gray
- Nickname: Polar Bears

John H. Lehman High School was a public high school in the Canton City School District. It was named for John House Lehman, "in honor of his extensive, untiring, and unselfish efforts for the public school system." In August 2017, it was added to the National Register of Historic Places.

== History ==
Lehman was built on the site of the original North High School in 1920 and served as a junior high until 1932, when it started to add grades above 9th grade. From 1920 to 1937 Lehman was a feeder school to Canton McKinley High School. The first class graduated in 1938.

Due to projections for declining enrollment in Canton City Schools, Lehman and Lincoln High School were closed as traditional high schools at the end of the 1975–76 school year and both buildings became junior highs.

A new Lehman Middle School was opened in 2004 on 13th St. and Broad Ave. NW, moving the students out of the old Lehman and to the new one. It was used on a temporary basis housing students while several elementary schools in Canton were being razed and rebuilt.

Around 2009, after the district discovered trespassing in the building, they had electricity suspended as a deterrent.

On August 24, 2017, it was added to the National Register of Historic Places.

== Athletics ==
=== Ohio High School Athletic Association State Championships ===
- Boys Basketball – 1971
