= Canton City School District =

School district in Ohio

Coordinates: 40°48′18″N 81°22′33″W

Address
- 305 McKinley Ave NW Canton, Ohio; United States

District information
- Type: Public School District
- Motto: Inspiring confident, creative, and open-minded learners
- Grades: PK-12
- Superintendent: Jeffery S. Talbert
- Schools: 21
- Budget: $110 Million

Students and staff
- Students: 8,000
- Student–teacher ratio: 15:1
- District mascot: Bulldogs
- Colours: Red & black

Other information
- Website: www.ccsdistrict.org

The Canton City School District (CCSD) is a public school district serving students in Canton, Ohio in the United States. In the 2020–2021 academic year its student enrollment was 8,000, making it the 22nd largest school district in the state. The district operates an early childhood center, twelve elementary schools, three middle schools and two 9–12 high schools. In addition to traditional schools, CCSD also operates four alternative schools. While the district primarily serves students in Canton city limits, they also serve small sections of surrounding areas, as well as the village of Meyers Lake. Students in the northern part of the city go to the Plain Local School District instead of the Canton City district.

== History ==
In 1824, James Lathrop, a Connecticut native, gathered a group of Canton businessmen to fund the building of Canton Academy on the site of what later became Timken High School.

In 2015, the district's Board of Education voted to approve the "One Community, One School" proposal, which combined the student populations of McKinley High School and Timken High School into one school building. McKinley High School would serve as the single high school for the school district, while Timken would serve as the freshman campus of McKinley as well as hosting the Timken Early College High School and several district-supported career and technical education programs.

In 2023, the superintendent submitted a proposal to make it so that students who had missed classes have to fulfill extra criteria to get credit for those classes.

== Current schools ==
=== Early childhood center ===
- Early Learning Center @ Schreiber

=== Elementary schools ===
- AIM Academy @ Belden (K-6)
- Arts Academy @ Summit (K-6)
- Cedar Elementary (K-3)
- Clarendon Elementary (4–6)
- Fairmont Learning Center (K-5)
- Gibbs Elementary (K-3)
- Harter Elementary (K-3)
- McGregor Elementary (4–6)
- Patrick (Allen) Elementary (K-6)
- Stone Elementary (K-3)
- Worley Elementary (K-6)
- Youtz Elementary (4–6)

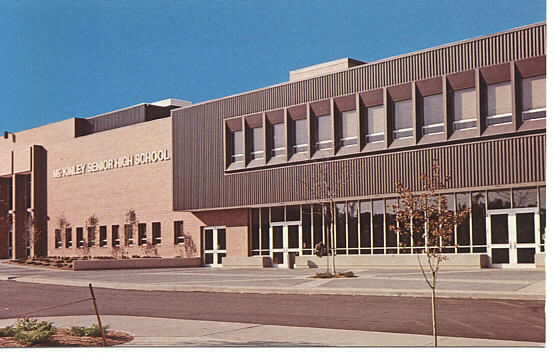
McKinley High School

=== Middle schools ===
- Crenshaw Middle (7–8)
- Early College Middle @ Lehman (7–8)
- STEAMM Academy @ Hartford Middle (4–8)

=== High schools ===
- Early College High @ Lehman (9–12)
- McKinley High School

=== Other schools ===
- Bulldog Virtual Academy (K-8 @ Mason, 9–12 @ Timken)
- Compton Learning Center (Passages, Choices)
- Timken Career Campus
- Canton Adult Education Center

== Former schools and current state ==
=== Former elementary schools ===
- Baxter Elementary School (abandoned)
- Burns (J.J.) Elementary School (razed)
- Garfield Elementary School (Beacon Academy, Stark High School)
- Horace Mann Elementary (Canton Harbor High School)
- Martin Elementary School (The Martin Center)
- Stark Elementary School (razed)
- Washington Elementary School (razed)
- Wells Elementary School (community center)
- West-North Elementary School (razed)
- Dueber Elementary School (community center)
- Smith Elementary School (razed)

=== Former high school buildings ===
- Canton High School (Renamed Canton Central when McKinley was built [1918], razed to build Timken H.S.)
- North High School (Razed to build Lehman [1932])
- Lehman High School (Oxford Place Senior Living Facility)
- Lincoln High School (Heritage Christian School)
- Timken High School (Timken Career Campus also known as Timken campus/downtown campus)

== Athletics ==
CCSD is part of the Federal League athletic conference, along with 6 other districts.

=== List of sports offered ===
- Cross country
- Football
- Sideline cheer
- Golf
- Soccer
- Tennis
- Volleyball
- Basketball
- Bowling
- Gymnastics
- Wrestling
- Swimming
- Competitive cheer
- Softball
- Track
