= McKinley High School (Canton, Ohio) =

Public school in Ohio, United States

Coordinates: 40°49′07″N 81°23′54″W

McKinley Senior High School
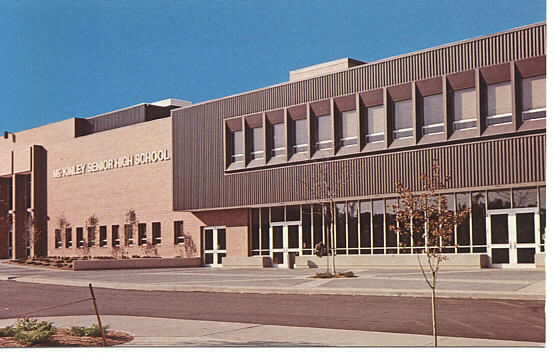

Location
- 2323 17th Street NW; Canton, Ohio 44708; United States

Information
- Type: Public, coeducational high school
- Motto: Where Champions are made and success is tradition
- School district: Canton City School District
- Superintendent: Jeffrey Talbert
- Teaching staff: 137.00 (FTE)
- Grades: 9–12
- Enrollment: 2,047 (2024–25)
- Student to teacher ratio: 14.94
- Colors: Red and black
- Fight song: Washington and Lee Swing Fight On, McKinley
- Athletics conference: Federal League
- Mascot: Bulldog
- Nickname: Pups (by fans)
- Team name: Bulldogs
- Rivals: Massillon Tigers
- Yearbook: Phoenix (formally The McKinleyite)
- Website: mckinley.ccsdistrict.org

McKinley Senior High School is a public high school in Canton, Ohio, United States. It is the only secondary school in the Canton City School District and has two campuses: Downtown Campus (also known as Early College High School; formerly Timken High School) and the main campus, which is known as McKinley Senior High School. Athletic teams are known as the Bulldogs in the Ohio High School Athletic Association as a member of the Federal League.

== History ==
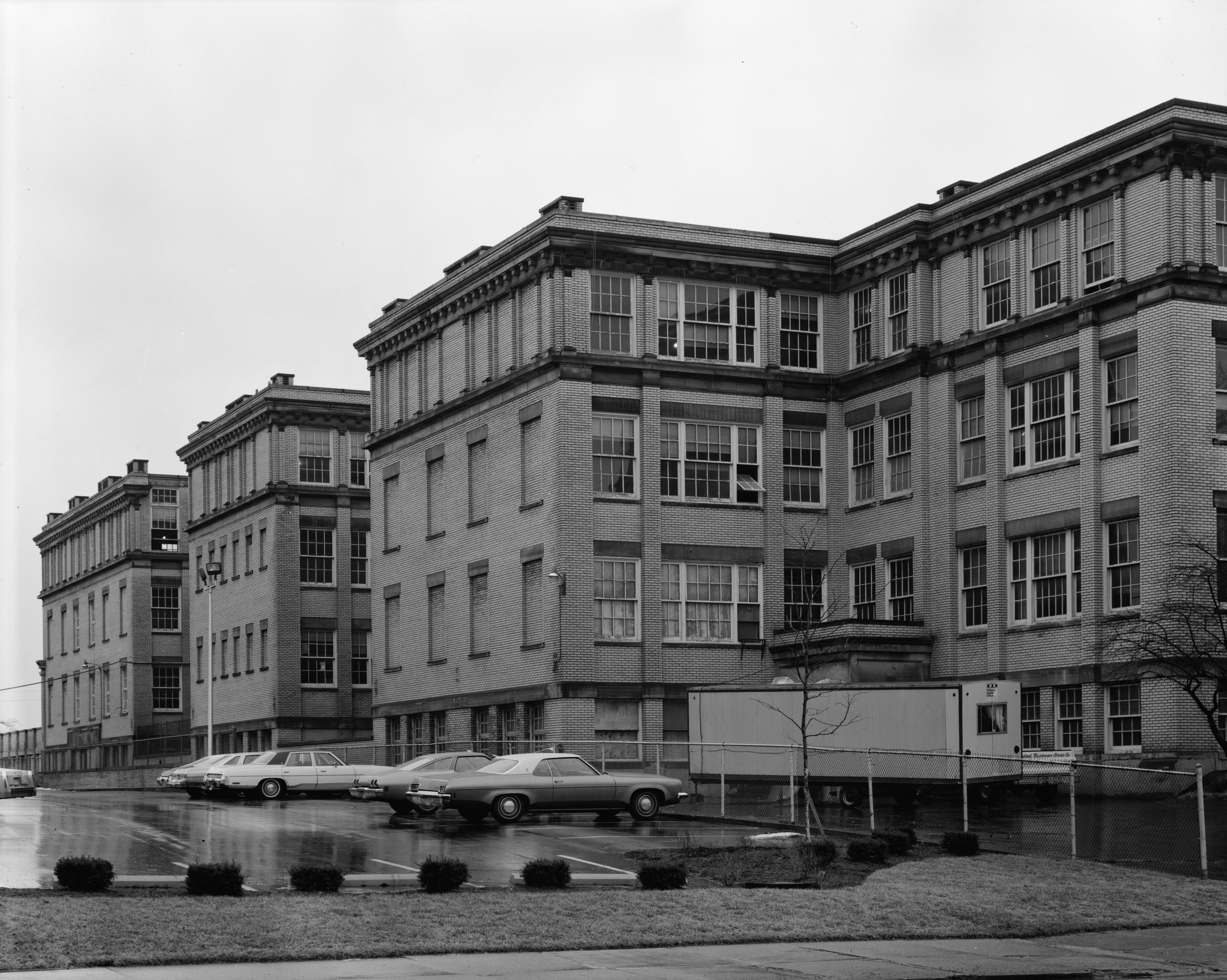
Old McKinley High School

The original McKinley building on Market Avenue North was opened on March 27, 1918. The students of Central High School and North High School were moved to the new building. The school was named for President William McKinley whose home was across the street from McKinley High School, and his sister, Anna McKinley, who taught in the Canton Public Schools for 30 years. When it opened, it was the only high school in Canton. By 1943, it was one of four high schools, as enrollment in the city schools dictated Lehman High School, Lincoln High School, and Timken Vocational High School be opened.

McKinley High School's enrollment peaked in the 1935–36 school year with 4,000 students attending. As the city of Canton's population declined, so did city school enrollment. In the spring of 1976, the Canton City Schools closed all four high schools in the city. Lehman and Lincoln reverted to junior high schools, and Timken Senior High School and McKinley Senior High School were their replacements. McKinley Senior opened in a new building on the site of Fawcett Stadium.

On February 25, 2015, Canton City Schools approved the "one community, one school" initiative by merging Timken High School into McKinley High School, giving Canton a single high school for the first time since 1937. Freshmen of the merged schools will attend the Freshmen Academy located at the current Timken High School, while grades 10–12 attend the senior high school located at the current McKinley building. The remaining high school will retain the McKinley name, mascot, colors, and Athletic records.

McKinley made national headlines in May 2021, after the head football coach Marcus Wattley allegedly forced an unnamed 17-year-old football team member to eat a pizza made with pork, although the student's religious beliefs prohibited him from consuming pork or pork residue. The Canton City School District announced that the head coach had been suspended, and later that he had been fired.

== Athletics ==
McKinley competes in the Federal League, one of the oldest athletic conferences in Ohio founded in 1964.

=== State championships ===
- Football – 1981, 1997, 1998
- Boys' swimming – 1937, 1939, 1940, 1945, 1949, 1951, 1952, 1956, 1957, 1958, 1959, 1960, 1961
- Boys' basketball – 1984, 2005, 2006
- Boys' golf – 1943
- Boys' track and field – 1997
- Boys' baseball – 1937, 1939
- Girls' volleyball – 1983, 1987, 1991
- Girls basketball – 2010

==== Non-OHSAA sanctioned national championships ====
- Football– 1895, 1896, 1920, 1927, 1934, 1942, 1944, 1955, 1956

==== Associated Press national championships ====
- Football– 1934, 1997

===== Football =====
Canton McKinley is 8th in the nation in football wins all-time. McKinley is also second in Ohio in win totals with 891. McKinley has won 12 state championships and 2 national championships. Since the OHSAA playoff format began, McKinley has won three state championships, in 1981, 1997, and 1998. They have been state runner-up three times in 1977, 1985, and 2004.

McKinley plays at Tom Benson Hall of Fame Stadium (formerly Fawcett Stadium), which seats over 22,500 fans. The stadium, part of Hall of Fame Village, is also home to the NFL's annual Pro Football Hall of Fame Game.

==== McKinley–Massillon rivalry ====
The Canton McKinley vs. Massillon Washington rivalry is the 13th most played rivalry in the nation, with 135 meetings between the schools. The rivalry is also tied for the nation's 14th oldest, dating back to 1894 and was profiled in the November 14, 1994 issue of Sports Illustrated. The Great American Rivalry Series which features the nation's top high school football rivalries has highlighted the rivalry 11 times since 2006.

===== Basketball =====
McKinley has won three state championships in 1983–84, 2004–05, and 2005–2006. They have been state runners-up eight times, and hold Ohio records for most appearances in the championship game (11), final four appearances (23), and sweet sixteen appearances (48).

== Notable alumni ==
- James B. Allardice – Emmy award-winning writer
- Mother Angelica – religious sister and founder of the Eternal Word Television Network
- Kierstan Bell – professional basketball player for the Women's National Basketball Association (WNBA)
- Matt Bors – editorial cartoonist and editor of online comics publication The Nib
- Brannon Braga – creator, writer, and producer of several Star Trek films and television series
- Hal Broda – former professional football player in the National Football League (NFL)
- Dwayne Broyles – former professional basketball player
- Kimberlé Crenshaw – legal theorist, Fulbright Scholar, and professor
- Frank DeVol – musician, composer, and actor; five-time Academy Award and Emmy Award nominee
- Mike Doss – former professional football player in the National Football League (NFL)
- Jack Dugger – former professional football player in the National Football League (NFL)r
- Kerwin Ray Ellis – former professional football player in the National Football League (NFL)
- Tyler Everett – former professional football player in the National Football League (NFL)
- Harold Fannin Jr. – professional football player in the National Football League (NFL)
- Ralph Fife – former professional football player in the National Football League (NFL)
- Randall Craig Fleischer – philharmonic conductor
- Wayne Fontes – former professional football coach in the National Football League (NFL)
- Cassietta George – Grammy-nominated gospel vocalist
- Wayne Gift – former professional football player in the National Football League (NFL)
- Gary Grant – former professional basketball player in the National Basketball Association (NBA)
- John Grimsley – former professional football player in the National Football League (NFL)
- Antonio Hall – former professional football player in the Canadian Football League (CFL)
- Ralph Hay – former owner of the Canton Bulldogs; co-founder of the National Football League
- William J. Healy II – former mayor of Canton, Ohio; member of the Ohio House of Representatives for the 52nd district
- Matt Hoopes – guitarist for the band Relient K
- Phil Hubbard – former professional football player in the National Basketball Association (NBA)
- Dick Kempthorn – former college football player
- Reuben Klamer – inventor of The Game of Life; inductee of the National Toy Hall of Fame
- Jamar Martin – former professional football player in the National Football League (NFL)
- Ben McDaniels – professional football coach in the National Football League (NFL)
- Josh McDaniels – professional football player in the National Football League (NFL)
- Keith McLeod – former professional basketball player in the National Basketball Association (NBA)
- Rip Miller – former college football coach
- Raymar Morgan – professional basketball player
- Marion Motley – former professional football player in the National Football League (NFL)
- The O'Jays – R&B group; inducted into the Rock and Roll Hall of Fame in 2005
- Kenny Peterson – former professional football player in the National Football League (NFL)
- Garland Rivers – former professional football player in the National Football League (NFL)
- Nick Roman – former professional football player in the National Football League (NFL)
- John Alfred Scali – former ABC News correspondent; U.S. Ambassador to the United Nations
- Don Scott – former professional football player in the National Football League (NFL)
- Robert Sedlock – former professional football player in the National Football League (NFL)
- George Sharrock – mayor of Anchorage, Alaska (1961–1964)
- Eric Snow – former basketball player in the National Basketball Association (NBA)
- Percy Snow – former professional football player in the National Football League (NFL)
- Harry Steel – former Olympic Gold Medal-winning heavyweight wrestler at the 1924 Paris games
- Blanche Thebom – former operatic mezzo-soprano with the New York Metropolitan Opera
- Nick Weatherspoon – former professional basketball player in the National Basketball Association (NBA)
- Frank A. Zazula – former college football coach

== Notable staff ==
- Jim Aiken – former college football and basketball coach
- Paul Bixler – former professional football coach in the National Football League (NFL)
- Ron Chismar – former college football coach
- Len Fontes – former professional football player in the National Football League (NFL)
- Harry Hazlett – former professional football player in the National Football League (NFL)
- Dewey King – former college football coach
- Harry March – co-founder of the New York Giants
- Thom McDaniels – former high school football coach
- Don Nehlen – former college football coach
- Dwight Peabody – former professional football player and coach in the National Football League (NFL)
- Bob Rupert – former college football coach
- Ben Schwartzwalder – former college football player and coach

== Gallery ==
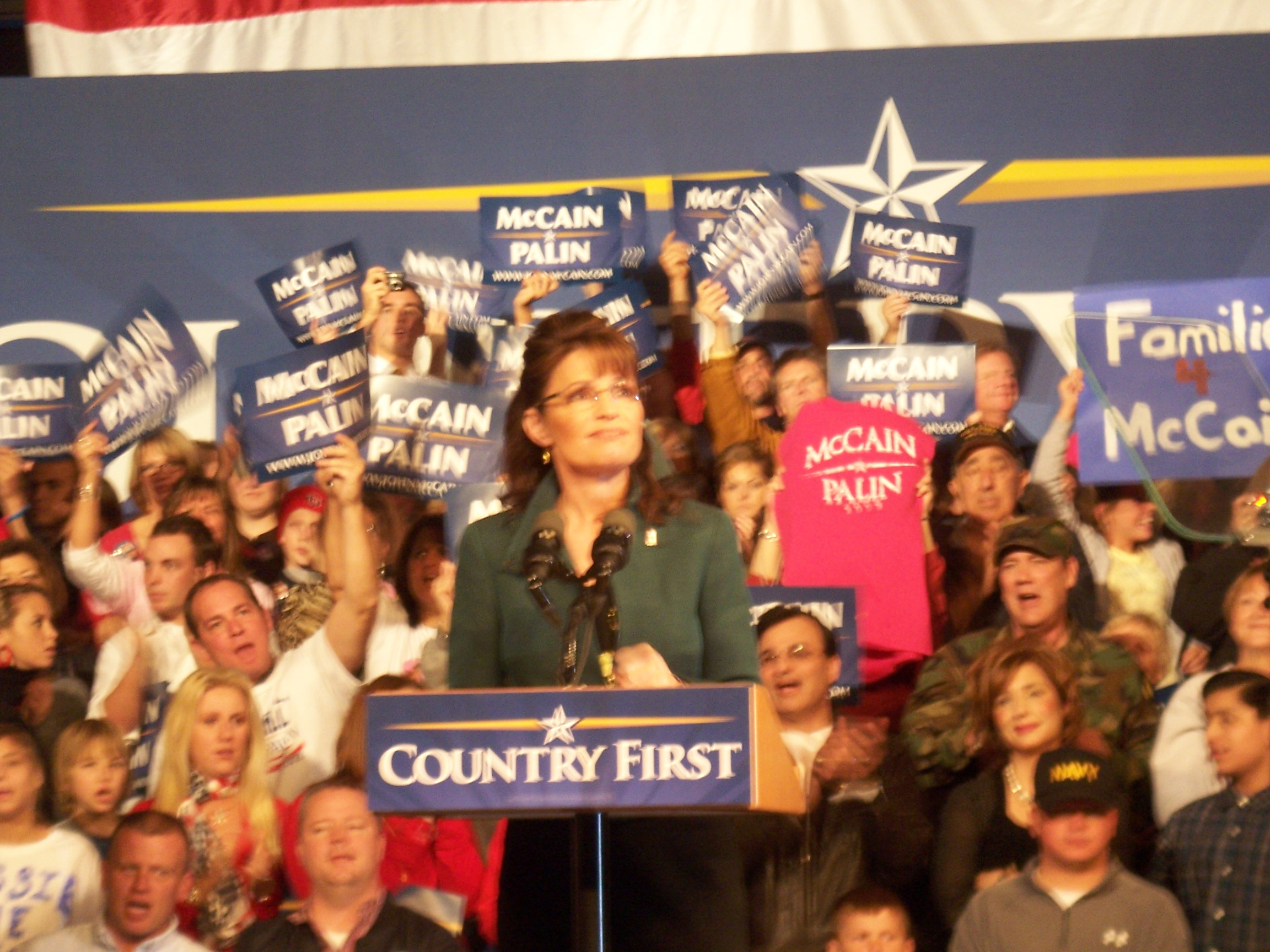
Sarah Palin speaks at McKinley High School

Gretchen Wilson performs at McKinley High School
