= Lincoln High School (Canton, Ohio) =

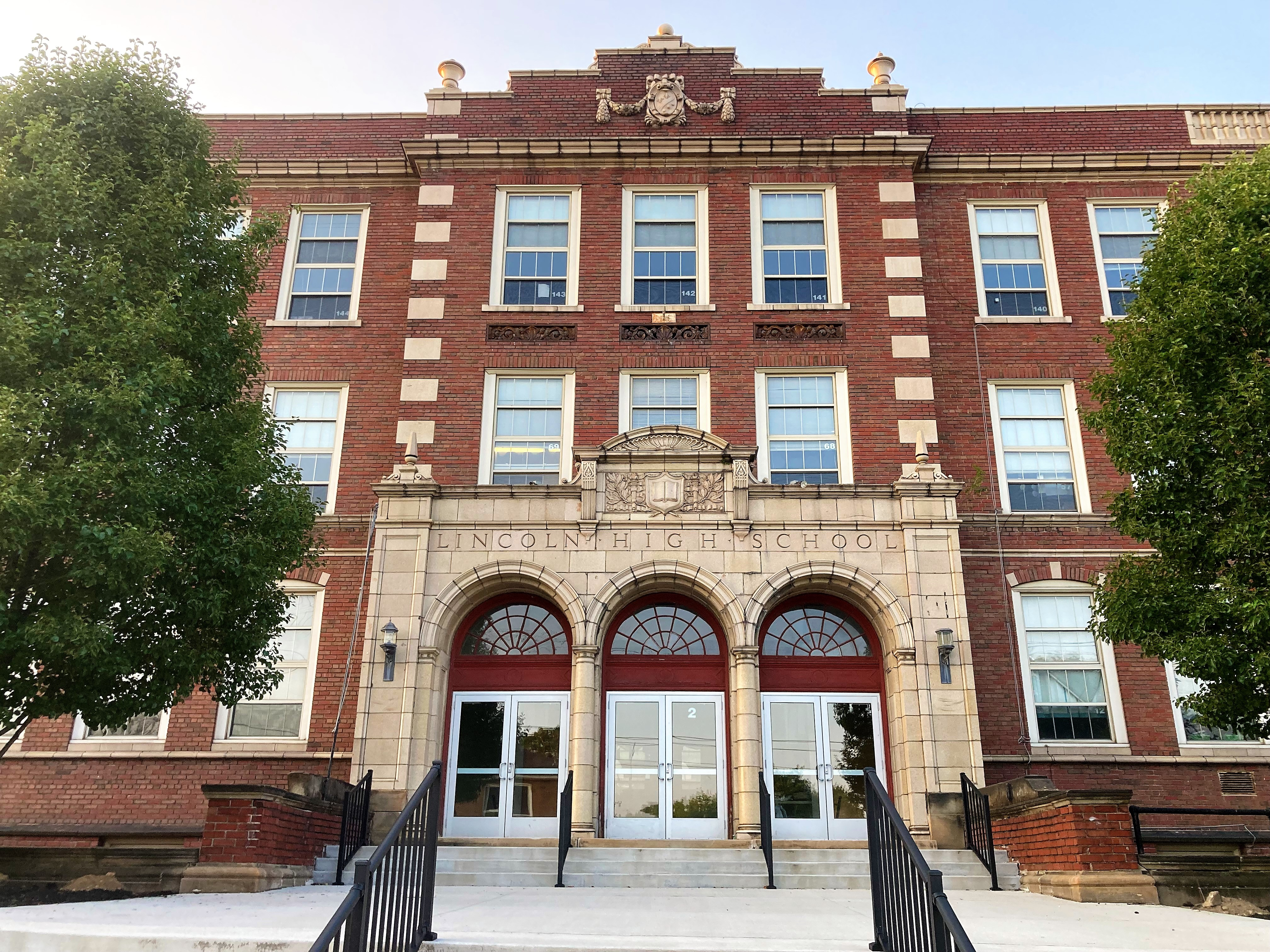

Location
- 2107 6th St. SW; Canton, Stark Co., Ohio 44706; United States; 40°47′49″N 81°23′50″W

Information
- Type: Public School
- Established: 1926
- Closed: 1976 (as a H.S.)
- Grades: 9–12
- Colors: Maroon & Gold
- Nickname: Lions

Lincoln High School was a public high school in the Canton City School District from 1926 until 1976.

The Lincoln Lions were members of the Hall of Fame Conference for football.

Due to low enrollment, Lincoln and Lehman High School were closed as traditional high schools at the end of the 1975–76 school year and became junior highs. The Lincoln building would eventually house Heritage Christian School in 1979.

== Notable alumni ==
- Don Nehlen – Coach: Head football; became head football coach at West Virginia University, College Football Hall of Fame inductee
- Dave Wottle (born August 7, 1950) gold medal - 800 meter run at the 1972 Summer Olympics
