= Orrville City School District =

School district in Ohio, United States

Address
- 815 North Ella Street Orrville, Ohio, 44667; United States

District information
- Type: Public
- Grades: PK–12
- Schools: 4
- NCES District ID: 3904461

Students and staff
- Students: 1,432 (2024–2025)
- Teachers: 92.80 (on an FTE basis) (2024–2025)
- Staff: 263.48 (on an FTE basis) (2024–2025)
- Student–teacher ratio: 15.43 (2024–2025)

Other information
- Website: www.orrvilleschools.org

Orrville City School District is a public school district serving students in the city of Orrville, Ohio, United States. The school district enrolls 1,725 students as of the 2012–2013 academic year.

== Schools ==
=== Elementary schools ===
Orrville Elementary opened in 2010 on the site of the former North street School. Building includes full size gym with wood floor and full service cafeteria. Along with computer labs a dedicated music room Library and Art room.

=== Middle schools ===
- Orrville Middle School (Grades 5th through 8th)Opened in January 2007. This is a completely new facility with full size wood floor gym and bleachers. Also contains dedicated Band and Choir Room along with rooms for Home Economics, Library, Art, Technology Lab.

=== High schools ===
- Orrville High School (Grades 9th through 12th)(New Building Opened in 2013 with new Gymnasium and Renovated Auditorium, all new class rooms and library and Choir room. The original office hall way of old building was renovated along with Cafeteria and Band rooms and locker rooms)

==== Future ====
Maple Street built which was built in 1913 along with three additions and North Elementary build 1960 were torn down, Oak Street Elementary 1908 with three additions and OJHS/OHS 1921 were torn down to make way for districts new campus concept. The new Orrville City schools campus sits along Ella, Mineral Spring Street and Elm Streets. The campus sits across from the town's Boys and Girls club. All three schools (elementary, middle, and high) will be located together, to "contribute an overall central campus feel for the school district."
