= Timken High School =

Coordinates: 40°47′59″N 81°22′43″W

Timken Senior High School

Location
- 521 Tuscarawas St. W. Canton, Ohio; USA

Information
- Type: Public high school
- Closed: 2015
- School district: Canton City School District
- Principal: Corey Grubbs
- Grades: 9-12
- Enrollment: 1,160
- Campus: Urban
- Colors: Blue and Gold
- Mascot: Trojans
- Website: http://timken.ccsdistrict.org/

Timken High School was a high school in Canton, Ohio. Timken participated in the Principals Athletic Conference (PAC-7/8), before they were absorbed by Canton McKinley in 2015.

== Formation ==
Timken Vocational High School was built in the 1930s by a donation from the Timken Foundation to the city of Canton, Ohio. As part of the Canton City School District with four quadrants and three district high schools, students could choose to take a test and enter a vocational program at Timken from any of the quadrants. Students were given opportunity to explore several occupational experiences during their Sophomore year. Their Junior and Senior year was spent in their choice of vocational program. For many years, the Timken Company hired the highest achieving Seniors and graduates from Secretarial Class, the Machine Shop, Electric Shop, Data Processing, and Welding Shop.

In 1976 the city consolidated their high schools and Timken was no longer a specialized vocational high school. The name was changed to Timken Senior High School. The school colors were blue and gold. The mascot was a Trojan.

The Timken Foundation generously contributed again in 1997 to the enhancement of the high school, and Stark State College joined the campus to provide early college classes. Students from the county can apply to attend early college classes, allowing students to earn an associate degree alongside their high school diploma.

== Grant ==
In 1997, Timken High School received a US$10 million grant from the Timken Foundation, the largest grant to date to a single public high school.

== Merger With McKinley ==
On February 25, 2015, Canton City Schools approved the merger of Canton McKinley High School and Timken High School, giving Canton a single high school for the first time since 1937. Freshmen of the merged schools attend the Freshman Academy in the current Timken High School, while grades 10–12 attend the senior high school in the current McKinley building. The remaining high school retains the McKinley name, mascot, and colors.

== Notable alumni ==
- John Pont – Head football coach at Miami University, Yale University, Northwestern University and Indiana University.
