= Portage Trail Conference =

The Portage Trail Conference or PTC was an association of five high schools and their associated middle/junior high schools located in the northeast region of the U.S. State of Ohio. In the conference's final season of competition, one member school was in Portage County, two were in Stark County, and one each was located in Summit and Trumbull counties. The conference officially began play in August 2005 with 16 member schools divided into two eight-school divisions based on enrollment, with the smaller schools in the County Division and the larger schools in the Metro Division. Games against teams in the opposite division did not count as conference games. Between 2013 and 2017, the conference experienced a number of membership changes, with four schools leaving and three schools joining. In 2020 the PTC underwent its largest changes since its inception as 10 schools left the conference. Two schools left the County Division to join different leagues while all eight Metro Division member schools left to form their own conference, the Metro Athletic Conference. Two smaller independent schools joined the five remaining PTC schools for the 2020–21 school year and the County Division name was dropped. Membership dropped to six schools in 2021 and for the 2024–25 school year, the conference competed with a total of five schools. At the end of the 2024–25 school year, the league folded after two member schools, Mogadore and Rootstown, announced their intention of playing elsewhere in the fall of 2025.

== All-time membership ==
School	Nickname	Location	Colors	Membership years	Division	New league
Cloverleaf High School	Colts	Westfield	Green, white	2015–2020	Metro	Metro Athletic Conference
Coventry High School	Comets	Coventry	Blue, gold	2005–2020	Metro	Metro Athletic Conference
Crestwood High School	Red Devils	Mantua	Red, gray, white	2005–2020	Metro/County	Chagrin Valley Conference
East Canton High School	Hornets	East Canton	Blue, gold	2005–2013	County	Inter-Valley Conference
Field High School	Falcons	Brimfield	Red, white, black	2005–2020	Metro	Metro Athletic Conference
James A. Garfield High School	G-Men	Garrettsville	Black, gold	2005–2021	County	Mahoning Valley Athletic Conference
John F. Kennedy Catholic School	Eagles	Warren	Blue, white, red	2020–2025	None	Independent
Mogadore High School	Wildcats	Mogadore	Green, white	2005–2025	None	Independent
Norton High School	Panthers	Norton	Red, black, white	2005–2020	Metro	Metro Athletic Conference
Lake Center Christian School	Tigers	Lake	Blue, gold	2015–2025	None	Independent
Ravenna High School	Ravens	Ravenna	Blue, white, red	2005–2020	Metro	Metro Athletic Conference
Rootstown High School	Roovers	Rootstown	Navy blue, white	2005–2025	None	Chagrin Valley Conference
Southeast High School	Pirates	Palmyra	Maroon, gold	2005–2024	Metro/County	Mahoning Valley Athletic Conference
Springfield High School	Spartans	Lakemore	Red, gray	2005–2020	Metro	Metro Athletic Conference
Streetsboro High School	Rockets	Streetsboro	Blue, gold	2005–2020	County/Metro	Metro Athletic Conference
St. Thomas Aquinas High School	Knights	Louisville	Black, gold	2020–2025	None	Independent
Theodore Roosevelt High School	Rough Riders	Kent	Red, white, black	2005–2015	Metro	Suburban League
Valley Christian School	Eagles	Youngstown	Royal blue, gold	2017–2020	County	Eastern Ohio Athletic Conference
Waterloo High School	Vikings	Atwater	Burgundy, white	2005–2017	County	Mahoning Valley Athletic Conference
Windham High School	Bombers	Windham	Black, gold	2005–2013	County	Northeastern Athletic Conference
Woodridge High School	Bulldogs	Cuyahoga Falls	Maroon, silver, white	2005–2020	County/Metro	Metro Athletic Conference

== History ==
The PTC was formed as an expansion and reorganization of the original Portage County League or PCL, which had existed for most of the 20th century and by 2003 included eight high schools in Portage County and two in neighboring Summit County. Beginning in 2003, school leaders in the league began to explore the possibilities of expansion and realignment to better meet the needs of all the schools involved due to the vast differences in enrollments at member schools.

Final Portage County League members:

- Crestwood Red Devils
- Field Falcons
- Garfield G-Men
- Mogadore Wildcats
- Rootstown Rovers
- Southeast Pirates
- Streetsboro Rockets
- Waterloo Vikings
- Windham Bombers
- Woodridge Bulldogs

Portage Trail Conference Divisions 2005–2020
Metro Division		County Division	
School	Years	School	Years
Cloverleaf	2015–2020	Crestwood	2015–2020
Coventry	2015–2020	East Canton	2005–2013
Crestwood	2005–2015	Garfield	2005–2020
Field	2005–2020	Lake Center Christian	2015–2020
Kent Roosevelt	2005–2015	Mogadore	2005–2020
Norton	2005–2020	Rootstown	2005–2020
Ravenna	2005–2020	Southeast	2011–2020
Southeast	2005–2011	Streetsboro	2005–2011; 2013–2015
Springfield	2005–2020	Valley Christian	2017–2020
Streetsboro	2011–2013; 2015–2020	Waterloo	2005–2017
Woodridge	2015–2020	Windham	2005–2013
		Woodridge	2005–2015

It was decided to expand the league and divide it into two divisions based on enrollment figures. Initially Ravenna, Norton, Springfield, East Canton, and Coventry accepted invitations to join the new league beginning in 2005. Later in the year, following news that the Western Reserve Conference (which had just lost member Ravenna) would be losing at least two additional member schools (leaving the South Division with just four teams), Kent Roosevelt left the WRC and accepted an invitation to join the new league effective in 2005 after initially choosing to remain in the WRC.

The Metro Division contained the larger schools, which competed in Ohio's Divisions II, III, and IV for football, while the County Division contained the smaller schools, who competed in divisions IV, V, VI, and VII. Because they were based on enrollment, a school's membership in a given division could change if enrollment numbers changed. Games between teams of the same division counted in conference standings, while games against schools from the other division were treated as non-conference games. The first division change occurred in 2011 the PTC announced in January that due to a change in enrollment figures, Streetsboro would move to the Metro Division and Southeast would move to the County Division for the 2011–12 school year.

East Canton announced in February 2011 that they would leave the PTC following the 2012–13 sports season to join the Inter-Valley Conference. Later that year in July, Windham announced their own departure from the conference citing enrollment issues. They also left the PTC after the 2012–13 school year and joined the Northeastern Athletic Conference. The PTC heard presentations from four area high schools (Barberton, Northwest, St. Thomas Aquinas, and Lake Center Christian) in May 2011, prior to the announcement that Windham would also be leaving the conference in 2013. Rather than expand, however, the PTC chose to stay at 14 teams, and Streetsboro moved back to the County Division for the 2013–14 school year. In September 2013, Kent Roosevelt announced plans to leave the PTC for the Suburban League beginning in the 2016–17 school year, later changed to the 2015–16 school year.

Cloverleaf High School announced in December 2013 it would leave the Suburban League for the Portage Trail Conference in 2015. Lake Center Christian announced it would join at the same time. The two schools officially joined in July 2015 and began conference play in August. At the same time, the divisions were reorganized, with Streetsboro and Woodridge changing to the Metro Division with new member Cloverleaf, and Crestwood moving to the County Division along with new member Lake Center Christian.

Waterloo High School announced intentions in early 2016 to leave the conference after the 2016–17 season. They began play in the Mahoning Valley Athletic Conference in August 2017. Valley Christian School in Youngstown was announced in December 2016 as the PTC's newest member, and began PTC play in August 2017, joining from the North Coast League.

The eight Metro Division schools announced on April 15, 2019, plans to break away from the PTC and start a new conference, later named the Metro Athletic Conference, beginning with the 2020–21 school year. In response to this, Crestwood (then the largest school in the County Division) announced it was considering leaving the PTC for the Chagrin Valley Conference, which was made official by a board of education vote on July 9, 2019.

Next, Valley Christian announced it was leaving after the 2019–20 school year to join the Eastern Ohio Athletic Conference, with Garfield announcing it was leaving after the 2020–21 school year to join the Mahoning Valley Athletic Conference (MVAC). In the wake of these events, four of the remaining County Division schools (Mogadore, Rootstown, Southeast and Lake Center Christian) began a search for schools to join the conference in order to keep it intact. On February 5, 2020, it was announced that beginning with the 2020–21 school year St. Thomas Aquinas and John F. Kennedy Catholic School, often called Warren JFK, would join the conference, bringing the final total to six schools (with five competing in football). The newest members began conference play in August 2020.

Southeast High School announced plans in November 2023 to leave the PTC after the 2023–24 school year to join the Mahoning Valley Athletic Conference and compete in the MVAC Grey division along with former PTC member Garfield. The Pirates officially began play in the MVAC at the beginning of the 2024–25 school year. Later in 2024, Rootstown announced board approval of their plan to leave the PTC after the 2024–25 school year to compete in the Chagrin Valley Conference Valley Division for at least the 2025–26 school year. In February 2025, Mogadore announced that they would compete as an independent in the 2025–26 school year after unsuccessful attempts at joining another conference. The PTC folded following the conclusion of the 2024–25 season.

== Championships ==
The PTC had championships in 18 different sports, the last additions being the boys' and girls' bowling tournament in 2007 and regular-season competition in 2008. During the divisional era, most sports had champions for each division, with the exceptions of boys' tennis and girls' tennis, which were never divided into divisions because a limited number of schools offered the sport. In football, baseball, basketball, soccer, softball, and volleyball, the division champion was determined by the results of regular-season play. Other sports—cross country, golf, bowling, track and field, tennis, and wrestling—weighed the regular-season and season-ending conference tournaments equally as part of determining the season's overall champion.

=== Football ===
Year	Metro	County	Playoff qualifiers (state division)
2005	Southeast	Garfield	Southeast (III), Garfield (IV), Mogadore (VI)
2006	Kent Roosevelt	Garfield, Mogadore	Kent Roosevelt (II), Coventry (III), Mogadore (VI), Windham (VI)
2007	Ravenna	Mogadore	Ravenna (III), Field (III), Mogadore (VI)
2008	Kent Roosevelt	East Canton, Mogadore	Kent Roosevelt (II), Field (III), Ravenna (III), East Canton (VI), Mogadore (VI)
2009	Ravenna	Mogadore, Woodridge	Ravenna (II), Field (III), Woodridge (IV), Mogadore (VI)
2010	Ravenna	Mogadore	Kent Roosevelt (II), Field (III), Garfield (IV), Mogadore (VI)
2011	Kent Roosevelt	Southeast	Kent Roosevelt (II), Ravenna (III), Southeast (III), Mogadore (VI)
2012	Kent Roosevelt	Mogadore	Kent Roosevelt (II), Ravenna (III), Woodrige (III), Mogadore (VI)
2013	Kent Roosevelt	Woodridge	Kent Roosevelt (II), Woodridge (IV), Mogadore (VI)
2014	Crestwood, Field, Ravenna	Mogadore	Crestwood (IV), Field (IV), Woodridge (IV), Mogadore (VI)
2015	Woodridge	Mogadore	Woodridge (IV), Crestwood (IV), Mogadore (VII)
2016	Woodridge	Crestwood	Crestwood (IV), Woodridge (IV), Garfield (V), Mogadore (VII)
2017	Woodridge	Rootstown	Woodridge (III), Mogadore (VI), Rootstown (VI), Valley Christian (VII)
2018	Norton, Ravenna, Woodridge	Mogadore	Mogadore (VI), Rootstown (VI)
2019	Streetsboro	Mogadore	Streetsboro (III), Garfield (V), Rootstown (V), Mogadore (VI),
Year	Overall		Playoff qualifiers (state division)
2020	Garfield		Garfield (V), Southeast (V), Rootstown (V), Mogadore (VI),
2021	Mogadore, Southeast, Warren JFK		Rootstown (V), Southeast (V); Mogadore (VI), Warren JFK (VII)
2022	Mogadore		Mogadore (VI), Rootstown (VI), Southeast (VI), Warren JFK (VII)
2023	Mogadore		Mogadore (VI), Rootstown (VI), Southeast (VI)
2024	Warren JFK		Mogadore (VI), Rootstown (VI), Warren JFK (VII)

=== Boys cross country ===
Overall conference winner based on combination of regular season finish and tournament finish.

Year	Metro	County	State finishes (state division)
2005	Field	Woodridge	Woodridge - 3rd (II), East Canton - 10th (III)
2006	Crestwood	Woodridge	Woodridge - State Champion (II), East Canton - 2nd (III)
2007	Crestwood	Woodridge	Woodridge - State Champion (II), Crestwood - 6th (II), Field - 11th (II)
2008	Crestwood	Woodridge	Woodridge - State Champion (II), Crestwood - 5th (II), East Canton - 5th (III)
2009	Field	Woodridge	Woodridge - State Champion (II)
2010	Field	Woodridge	Woodridge - State Champion (II)
2011	Crestwood	Woodridge	Woodridge - 4th (II)
2012	Crestwood	Woodridge	Woodridge - State Champion (II)
2013	Crestwood	Woodridge	Woodridge - 8th (II)
2014	Crestwood	Woodridge	Woodridge - 14th (II)
2015	Woodridge	Crestwood	Woodridge - 4th (II)
2016	Woodridge	Rootstown	Woodridge - State Champion (II)
2017	Woodridge	Garfield	Woodridge - 4th (II)
2018	Woodridge	Garfield	Woodridge - State Champion (II)
2019	Woodridge	Crestwood	Woodridge - State Champion (II), Cloverleaf - 17th (II)
Year	Overall		State finishes (state division)
2020	Rootstown		
2021	Lake Center Christian		
2022	Mogadore		
2023	Rootstown		
2024	Rootstown		

=== Girls cross country ===
Overall conference winner based on combination of regular season finish and tournament finish.

Year	Metro	County	State finishes (state division)
2005	Crestwood	Woodridge	Crestwood - 4th (II), Woodridge - 12th (III)
2006	Crestwood	Woodridge	Woodridge - 5th (III)
2007	Crestwood	Woodridge	Woodridge - 7th (II), Waterloo - 11th (III)
2008	Crestwood	Woodridge	Woodridge - 4th (II)
2009	Crestwood	Woodridge	Woodridge - 10th (II)
2010	Kent Roosevelt	Woodridge	Woodridge - 4th (II)
2011	Crestwood	Woodridge	Woodridge - 13th (II)
2012	Crestwood	Woodridge	Woodridge - 9th (II)
2013	Crestwood	Woodridge	Crestwood - 13th (II)
2014	Kent Roosevelt	Woodridge	Woodridge - 6th (II)
2015	Cloverleaf	Crestwood	Woodridge - 6th (II), Cloverleaf - 8th (II)
2016	Woodridge	Crestwood	Woodridge - State Champion (II)
2017	Woodridge	Crestwood	Woodridge - 13th (II)
2018	Woodridge	Crestwood	Woodridge - 16th (II)
2019	Woodridge	Crestwood	Woodridge - 9th (II)
Year	Overall		State finishes (state division)
2020	Rootstown		
2021	Mogadore		
2022	Mogadore		Mogadore - 7th (III)
2023	Mogadore		Mogadore - 16th (III)
2024	Mogadore		Mogadore - 11th (III)

=== Girls tennis ===
Overall conference winner based on combination of regular season finish and tournament finish. No champion is declared from 2020 onward due to a lack of teams.

Year	Regular season	Tournament	Overall
2005	Ravenna	Ravenna	Ravenna
2006	Ravenna	Ravenna	Ravenna
2007	Ravenna	Ravenna	Ravenna
2008	Ravenna	Ravenna	Ravenna
2009	Kent Roosevelt	Kent Roosevelt	Kent Roosevelt
2010	Kent Roosevelt	Kent Roosevelt	Kent Roosevelt
2011	Kent Roosevelt	Kent Roosevelt	Kent Roosevelt
2012	Kent Roosevelt	Kent Roosevelt	Kent Roosevelt
2013	Kent Roosevelt	Field	Field, Kent Roosevelt
2014		Kent Roosevelt	Kent Roosevelt
2015	Field	Norton	Field, Norton
2016		Norton	Norton
2017	Norton	Norton	Norton
2018		Norton	
2019		Norton	

=== Boys golf ===
Overall division winner based on combination of regular season finish and tournament finish.

	Metro			County		
Year	Regular season	Tournament	Overall	Regular season	Tournament	Overall
2005	Kent Roosevelt	Ravenna	Ravenna	Rootstown	Mogadore	Mogadore, Rootstown
2006	Kent Roosevelt	Ravenna	Kent Roosevelt	Mogadore	Mogadore	Mogadore
2007	Kent Roosevelt	Kent Roosevelt	Kent Roosevelt	Rootstown	Rootstown	Rootstown
2008	Kent Roosevelt	Crestwood	Crestwood, Kent Roosevelt	Mogadore	Rootstown	Rootstown
2009	Kent Roosevelt	Kent Roosevelt	Kent Roosevelt	Rootstown	Rootstown	Rootstown
2010	Crestwood, Kent Roosevelt	Kent Roosevelt	Kent Roosevelt	Rootstown, Woodridge	Woodridge	Woodridge
2011	Crestwood, Kent Roosevelt	Kent Roosevelt	Kent Roosevelt	Woodridge	Woodridge	Woodridge
2012	Kent Roosevelt	Kent Roosevelt	Kent Roosevelt	Woodridge	Woodridge	Woodridge
2013	Kent Roosevelt	Kent Roosevelt	Kent Roosevelt	Mogadore	Southeast	Southeast
2014	Kent Roosevelt	Kent Roosevelt	Kent Roosevelt	Woodridge	Woodridge	Woodridge
2015	Norton	Field	Norton	Rootstown	Rootstown	Rootstown
2016	Field	Field	Field	Rootstown	Rootstown	Rootstown
2017	Woodridge	Coventry	Coventry	Garfield, Mogadore	Garfield	Garfield
2018	Coventry	Coventry	Coventry	Rootstown	Mogadore	Mogadore, Rootstown
2019	Cloverleaf	Cloverleaf	Cloverleaf	Mogadore	Mogadore	Mogadore
Year	Regular season		Tournament		Overall	
2020	Mogadore		Mogadore		Mogadore	
2021	Rootstown		Rootstown		Rootstown	
2022	Mogadore, Warren JFK		Mogadore		Mogadore	
2023	Warren JFK		Warren JFK		Warren JFK	
2024			Warren JFK		Warren JFK	

=== Girls golf ===
Overall division winner based on combination of regular season finish and tournament finish.

Year	Regular season	Tournament	Overall
2015	Norton	Southeast	Norton
2016	Cloverleaf	Cloverleaf	Cloverleaf
2017	Cloverleaf	Cloverleaf	Cloverleaf
2018	Cloverleaf	Cloverleaf	Cloverleaf
2019	Cloverleaf	Cloverleaf	Cloverleaf
2020	Garfield	Garfield	Garfield
2021	Southeast	Southeast	Southeast
2022	Southeast	Southeast	Southeast
2023	Southeast	Southeast	Southeast
2024		Rootstown	

=== Boys soccer ===
Year	Metro	County	State finishes (state division)
2005	Kent Roosevelt	Rootstown, Waterloo	Kent Roosevelt - Regional Semifinals (I)
2006	Crestwood	Waterloo	
2007	Kent Roosevelt	Woodridge	
2008	Kent Roosevelt	Woodridge	Woodridge - Regional Semifinals (II)
2009	Kent Roosevelt	Woodridge	Rootstown - Regional Semifinals (III)
2010	Norton	Woodridge	
2011	Coventry	Waterloo	
2012	Kent Roosevelt	Woodridge	Garfield - Regional Semifinals (III)
2013	Field	Garfield	
2014	Kent Roosevelt	Woodridge	
2015	Woodridge	Lake Center Christian	
2016	Woodridge	Lake Center Christian	Rootstown - Regional Semifinals (III)
2017	Woodridge	Rootstown	Rootstown - Regional Runner-Up (III)
2018	Woodridge	Crestwood	
2019	Field	Crestwood	Crestwood - Regional Semifinals (III)
Year	Overall		State finishes (state division)
2020	Southeast		
2021			
2022			
2023	Warren JFK		
2024	Lake Center Christian		Lake Center Christian - Regional Runner-Up (V), Rootstown - Regional Semifinals (V)

=== Girls soccer ===
Year	Metro	County	State finishes (state division)
2005	Woodridge (Note: There was no split between Metro and County division titles in 2005.)		
2006	Crestwood, Kent Roosevelt, Norton, Ravenna	Garfield, Woodridge	
2007	Ravenna	Woodridge	
2008	Ravenna	Woodridge	
2009	Kent Roosevelt	Rootstown	
2010	Kent Roosevelt, Norton	Woodridge	
2011	Kent Roosevelt	Rootstown	
2012	Coventry, Kent Roosevelt, Norton	Rootstown	Rootstown - Regional Semifinals (III), Waterloo - Regional Semifinals (III)
2013	Norton	Rootstown	
2014	Kent Roosevelt	Southeast	Rootstown - Regional Semifinals (III)
2015	Field	Crestwood	
2016	Field	Southeast	
2017	Field, Streetsboro	Southeast	Rootstown - Regional Semifinals (III)
2018	Field	Southeast	
2019	Streetsboro	Garfield	
Year	Overall		State finishes (state division)
2020	Southeast		
2021	Rootstown		
2022	Rootstown		
2023	Warren JFK		
2024	Warren JFK		Warren JFK - Regional Semifinals (V)

=== Girls volleyball ===
Year	Metro	County	State finishes (state division)
2005	Southeast	Streetsboro	
2006	Crestwood, Southeast	Streetsboro, Waterloo	
2007	Field	Streetsboro	
2008	Field	Streetsboro	
2009	Southeast	Streetsboro	
2010	Kent Roosevelt	Streetsboro, Waterloo	Field - Regional Semifinals (II)
2011	Kent Roosevelt	Waterloo	
2012	Crestwood, Kent Roosevelt	Southeast	
2013	Kent Roosevelt	Southeast	Crestwood - Regional Runner-Up (II)
2014	Crestwood	Southeast	
2015	Cloverleaf	Southeast	
2016	Cloverleaf, Streetsboro	Southeast	
2017	Norton	Crestwood	
2018	Coventry	Crestwood	Crestwood - Regional Semifinals (II)
2019	Coventry	Crestwood	Crestwood - Regional Runner-Up (III)
Year	Overall		State finishes (state division)
2020	Southeast		
2021	Lake Center Christian, Rootstown		
2022	Lake Center Christian		
2023	Rootstown		
2024	Mogadore		

=== Boys basketball ===
Year	Metro	County	State finishes (state division)
2006	Springfield	Windham	Windham - Final Four (IV)
2007	Springfield	Windham	Windham - Sweet 16 (IV)
2008	Kent Roosevelt	Streetsboro	Windham - Sweet 16 (IV)
2009	Kent Roosevelt	Streetsboro, Waterloo	Streetsboro - Sweet 16 (II)
2010	Norton	East Canton	East Canton - Sweet 16 (III)
2011	Crestwood, Kent Roosevelt	Streetsboro	Windham - Sweet 16 (IV)
2012	Kent Roosevelt, Norton	Southeast, Woodridge	Mogadore - Sweet 16 (IV), Windham - Sweet 16 (IV)
2013	Norton	Windham	Windham - Sweet 16 (IV)
2014	Norton	Streetsboro	
2015	Coventry	Mogadore	Mogadore - Sweet 16 (IV)
2016	Coventry	Mogadore	
2017	Woodridge	Crestwood, Mogadore	Garfield (Sweet 16) (III)
2018	Norton, Woodridge	Mogadore	
2019	Woodridge	Mogadore, Valley Christian	Mogadore - Regional Runner-Up (III)
2020	Streetsboro	Crestwood	
Year	Overall		State finishes (state division)
2021	Mogadore		Warren JFK - Regional Runner-Up (IV)
2022	Mogadore, St. Thomas Aquinas		St. Thomas Aquinas - Regional Runner-Up (IV)
2023	St. Thomas Aquinas, Warren JFK		
2024	Mogadore		Warren JFK - Regional Runner-Up (IV)
2025	Warren JFK		Warren JFK - Regional Runner-Up (VII)

=== Girls basketball ===
Year	Metro	County	State finishes (state division)
2006	Southeast	East Canton, Rootstown, Waterloo	Waterloo - Sweet 16 (III), East Canton - State Runner-Up (IV)
2007	Crestwood, Southeast	Waterloo	Waterloo - Sweet 16 (III), East Canton - Regional Runner-Up (IV)
2008	Southeast	East Canton	Rootstown - Regional Runner-Up (III), East Canton - Sweet 16 (IV)
2009	Field	Mogadore	
2010	Ravenna	Mogadore	
2011	Ravenna	Mogadore	Norton - Sweet 16 (II)
2012	Ravenna	Woodridge	Windham - Regional Runner-Up (IV)
2013	Norton	Southeast	Norton - Sweet 16 (II), Mogadore - Sweet 16 (III)
2014	Kent Roosevelt, Ravenna	Mogadore, Southeast	
2015	Kent Roosevelt	Southeast	Garfield - Regional Runner-Up (III)
2016	Ravenna	Garfield, Southeast	
2017	Norton	Southeast	Norton - Regional Runner-Up (II), Garfield - Regional Runner-Up (III)
2018	Cloverleaf, Norton	Garfield	Norton - Sweet 16 (II)
2019	Norton	Southeast	Southeast - Sweet 16 (III)
2020	Norton	Southeast	Norton - Sweet 16 (II)
Year	Overall		State finishes (state division)
2021	Garfield, Southeast		Garfield - Sweet 16 (III)
2022	Mogadore, Rootstown		
2023	Rootstown		
2024	Rootstown		
2025	Rootstown		Rootstown - State Runner-Up (VI), Warren JFK - Sweet 16 (VII), Mogadore - Final Four (VII)

=== Wrestling ===
Overall division winner based on combination of regular season finish and tournament finish.

	Metro			County		
Year	Regular season	Tournament	Overall	Regular season	Tournament	Overall
2006	Ravenna	Ravenna	Ravenna	Woodridge	Woodridge	Woodridge
2006	Ravenna	Ravenna	Ravenna	Woodridge	Woodridge	Woodridge
2008	Ravenna	Ravenna	Ravenna	Woodridge	Woodridge	Woodridge
2009	Coventry	Southeast	Coventry	Streetsboro	Streetsboro	Streetsboro
2010	Coventry	Coventry	Coventry	Waterloo	Waterloo	Waterloo
2011	Crestwood	Crestwood	Crestwood	Rootstown, Garfield, Waterloo	Rootstown	
2012	Crestwood	Crestwood	Crestwood	Southeast	Rootstown	
2013	Crestwood, Coventry, Ravenna	Crestwood	Crestwood	Rootstown	Woodridge	Rootstown, Woodridge
2014	Coventry	Crestwood	Crestwood	Woodridge	Rootstown	Rootstown, Woodridge
2015	Crestwood	Ravenna	Crestwood, Ravenna	Southeast	Southeast	Southeast
2016	Ravenna	Woodridge	Woodridge	Southeast	Rootstown	Rootstown, Southeast
2017	Woodridge	Woodridge	Woodridge	Rootstown	Rootstown	Rootstown
2018	Cloverleaf, Norton	Norton	Norton, Woodridge	Rootstown	Rootstown	Rootstown
2019	Norton	Streetsboro	Norton	Rootstown	Rootstown	Rootstown
2020	Norton	Norton	Norton	Rootstown	Rootstown	Rootstown
Year	Regular season		Tournament		Overall	
2021					Rootstown	
2022					Rootstown	
2023	Rootstown		Rootstown		Rootstown	

=== Boys bowling ===
Overall conference winner based on combination of regular-season finish and tournament finish. From 2010 through 2015, champions were crowned in both Metro and County divisions before reverting back to an overall champion for the 2016 season. In the 2020 season, a preseason tournament was introduced, before being cancelled in the 2021 season due to the COVID-19 pandemic and not returning.

Year	Regular season		Tournament		Overall		State finishes (state division)
2007	N/A		Kent Roosevelt		Kent Roosevelt		
2008	Ravenna		Kent Roosevelt		Kent Roosevelt, Ravenna		
2009	Ravenna		Crestwood		Crestwood		
	Metro			County			
Year	Regular season	Tournament	Overall	Regular season	Tournament	Overall	State finishes (state division)
2010	Kent Roosevelt	Crestwood	Crestwood, Kent Roosevelt	Garfield	Garfield	Garfield	Kent Roosevelt - 13th (I)
2011	Kent Roosevelt	Crestwood	Crestwood, Kent Roosevelt	Garfield	Garfield	Garfield	Crestwood - 13th (I)
2012	Crestwood	Crestwood	Crestwood	Garfield	Garfield	Garfield	
2013	Kent Roosevelt	Kent Roosevelt	Kent Roosevelt	Garfield	East Canton	Garfield	
2014	Crestwood	Springfield	Crestwood	Woodridge	Garfield	Garfield, Woodridge	
2015	Crestwood, Norton, Springfield	Norton	Norton	Woodridge	Woodridge	Woodridge	Springfield - 13th (I)
Year	Regular season		Tournament		Overall		State finishes (state division)
2016	Norton, Springfield		Crestwood		Crestwood, Norton, Springfield		Springfield - 5th (I), Woodridge - 4th (II), Coventry - 7th (II)
2017	Woodridge		Woodridge		Woodridge		Woodridge - 4th (II), Crestwood - 11th (II)
2018	Woodridge		Coventry				
2019	Woodridge		Woodridge		Woodridge		Woodridge - 4th (II)
Year	Preseason Tournament	Regular season	Tournament		Overall		State finishes (state division)
2020	Woodridge	Woodridge	Woodridge		Woodridge		Woodridge - 5th (II)
Year	Regular season		Tournament		Overall		State finishes (state division)
2021			Garfield		Garfield		Rootstown - 14th (II)
2022			Rootstown		Rootstown		Rootstown - 12th (II)
2023			Rootstown		Rootstown		
2024	Rootstown		Rootstown		Rootstown		
2025	Rootstown		Rootstown		Rootstown		Rootstown - 9th (II)

=== Girls bowling ===
Overall conference winner based on combination of regular-season finish and tournament finish. From 2010 through 2015, champions were crowned in both Metro and County divisions before reverting back to an overall champion for the 2016 season. In the 2020 season, a preseason tournament was introduced, before being cancelled in the 2021 season due to the COVID-19 pandemic and not returning.

Year	Regular season		Tournament		Overall		State finishes (state division)
2007	N/A		Garfield		Garfield		Garfield - 8th (I)
2008	Garfield		Crestwood		Crestwood, Garfield		
2009	Garfield		Garfield		Garfield		
	Metro			County			
Year	Regular season	Tournament	Overall	Regular season	Tournament	Overall	State finishes (state division)
2010	Kent Roosevelt	Kent Roosevelt	Kent Roosevelt	Garfield	Garfield	Garfield	
2011	Coventry	Coventry	Coventry	Garfield	Garfield	Garfield	
2012	Springfield	Springfield	Springfield	Garfield	Garfield	Garfield	
2013	Springfield	Coventry	Coventry, Springfield	Garfield	Garfield	Garfield	Springfield - 13th (I)
2014		Kent Roosevelt	Kent Roosevelt	Garfield	Garfield	Garfield	Coventry - 2nd (I)
2015	Crestwood	Kent Roosevelt	Crestwood	Garfield	Woodridge	Garfield, Woodridge	Garfield - 11th (II)
Year	Regular season		Tournament		Overall		State finishes (state division)
2016	Norton		Norton		Norton		Norton - 5th (II), Crestwood - 10th (II), Garfield - 12th (II)
2017	Norton		Norton		Norton		Crestwood - 12th (II)
2018	Garfield		Springfield				Springfield - 12th (II), Garfield - 15th (II)
2019			Springfield		Springfield		Norton - 13th (I), Springfield - 7th (II), Coventry - 11th (II)
Year	Preseason Tournament	Regular season	Tournament		Overall		State finishes (state division)
2020	Garfield	Garfield, Norton, Springfield	Springfield		Springfield		Norton - 11th (I), Springfield - 13th (II), Coventry - 14th (II)
Year	Regular season		Tournament		Overall		State finishes (state division)
2021			Garfield		Garfield		Garfield - 14th (II)
2022	Rootstown		Rootstown		Rootstown		
2023	Rootstown		Rootstown		Rootstown		
2024	Rootstown		Rootstown		Rootstown		Rootstown - 4th (II)
2025	Rootstown		Rootstown		Rootstown		Rootstown - 7th (II)

=== Boys track and field ===
Overall division winner based on combination of regular season and division meet finish.

	Metro			County			
Year	Regular season	Conference meet	Overall	Regular season	Conference meet	Overall	State finishes (state division)
2006	Field	Field	Field	Streetsboro	Streetsboro	Streetsboro	
2007	Crestwood	Crestwood	Crestwood	Streetsboro	Streetsboro	Streetsboro	
2008	Crestwood	Crestwood	Crestwood	Woodridge	Woodridge	Woodridge	
2009	Crestwood	Crestwood	Crestwood	Woodridge	Woodridge	Woodridge	
2010	Crestwood, Southeast	Southeast	Southeast	Woodridge	Woodridge	Woodridge	Woodridge - 2nd (II)
2011	Southeast	Southeast	Southeast	Woodridge	Woodridge	Woodridge	
2012	Crestwood	Kent Roosevelt	Crestwood, Kent Roosevelt	Woodridge	Woodridge	Woodridge	
2013	Kent Roosevelt	Kent Roosevelt	Kent Roosevelt	Woodridge	Woodridge	Woodridge	
2014	Field	Field	Field	Woodridge	Woodridge	Woodridge	
2015	Coventry, Crestwood, Field	Field	Field	Woodridge	Woodridge	Woodridge	
2016	Coventry	Woodridge	Coventry, Woodridge				

=== Girls track and field ===
Overall division winner based on combination of regular season and division meet finish.

	Metro			County			
Year	Regular season	Conference meet	Overall	Regular season	Conference meet	Overall	State finishes (state division)
2006	Crestwood	Crestwood	Crestwood	Woodridge	Woodridge	Woodridge	Crestwood - State Champion (II)
2007	Field	Crestwood	Crestwood, Field	Woodridge	Woodridge	Woodridge	
2008	Ravenna	Ravenna	Ravenna	Ravenna	Woodridge	Woodridge	
2009	Kent Roosevelt	Kent Roosevelt	Kent Roosevelt	Woodridge	Woodridge	Woodridge	Woodridge - 10th (II)
2010	Kent Roosevelt	Kent Roosevelt	Kent Roosevelt	Woodridge	Waterloo	Woodridge, Waterloo	Woodridge - 9th (II)
2011	Kent Roosevelt	Kent Roosevelt	Kent Roosevelt	Woodridge	Woodridge	Woodridge	
2012	Crestwood	Crestwood, Kent Roosevelt	Crestwood	Woodridge	Woodridge	Woodridge	
2013	Crestwood	Kent Roosevelt	Crestwood, Kent Roosevelt	Woodridge	Woodridge	Woodridge	

=== Baseball ===
Year	Metro	County	State finishes (state division)
2006	Norton	Woodridge	
2007	Field	Woodridge	
2008	Field	Woodridge	
2009	Kent Roosevelt	Garfield	
2010	Crestwood	Woodridge	
2011	Ravenna	Garfield	
2012	Ravenna	Garfield, Southeast	
2013	Field	Southeast, Woodridge	
2018	Woodridge		

=== Softball ===
Year	Metro	County	State finishes (state division)
2006	Springfield	Garfield	
2007	Field	Garfield	
2008	Field	Garfield, Waterloo	
2009	Field	Waterloo	
2010	Field	East Canton, Garfield	
2011	Springfield	Garfield	
2012	Springfield	Woodridge	
2013	Field	Windham	
2017	Norton	Crestwood	

=== Boys tennis ===
Overall conference winner based on combination of regular season finish and tournament finish.

Year	Regular season	Tournament	Overall
2006	Norton	Norton	Norton
2007	Norton	Norton	Norton
2008	Norton	Norton	Norton
2009	Kent Roosevelt	Kent Roosevelt	Kent Roosevelt
2010	Kent Roosevelt	Kent Roosevelt	Kent Roosevelt
2011	Kent Roosevelt	Kent Roosevelt	Kent Roosevelt
2012	Norton	Norton	Norton
2013	Norton	Norton	Norton
2014	Norton	Norton	Norton
2015	Norton	Norton	Norton
2016	Norton	Norton	Norton
2017	Woodridge	Woodridge	Woodridge
2018		Woodridge	
