= Metro Athletic Conference (Ohio) =

High school athletics conference in northeastern Ohio, United States

The Metro Athletic Conference is an Ohio High School Athletic Association (OHSAA) athletic league that began competition in the 2020-21 school year. The league is made up of member schools from Medina, Portage and Summit counties in Ohio.

== Current members ==
School	Nickname	Location	Colors	Joined	Notes
Cloverleaf	Colts	Westfield	Green, white	2020	Leaving for Principals Athletic Conference in 2028
Cuyahoga Falls	Black Tigers	Cuyahoga Falls	Black, yellow	2026	
Field	Falcons	Brimfield	Red, white, black	2020	
Norton	Panthers	Norton	Red, black, white	2020	
Ravenna	Ravens	Ravenna	Blue, white, red	2020	leaving for Greater Portage Athletic Conference in 2027
Kent Roosevelt	Rough Riders	Kent	Red, white, black	2026	
Springfield	Spartans	Lakemore	Red, gray	2020	leaving for Greater Portage Athletic Conference in 2027
Streetsboro	Rockets	Streetsboro	Blue, gold	2020	
Tallmadge	Blue Devils	Tallmadge	Blue, yellow	2026	
Woodridge	Bulldogs	Cuyahoga Falls	Maroon, silver, white	2020	

== Former members ==
School	Nickname	Location	Colors	Tenure	Notes
Coventry	Comets	Coventry	Blue, gold	2020–2026	Left for Principals Athletic Conference

== History ==
A previous Metro Athletic Conference existed primarily in Mahoning, Trumbull, and Columbiana Counties until 2008. It was founded in 1972 as the Mahoning Valley Conference and renamed Metro Athletic Conference in 1994. The conference merged with the Trumbull Athletic Conference in 2008 and formed the All-American Conference.

The current Metro Athletic Conference was established in April 2019 after the superintendents of all eight school districts that made up the Portage Trail Conference (PTC) Metro Division voted to move forward with establishing a new league separate from the PTC to begin play in August 2020. Reasons given for leaving the PTC included concerns over officiating, scheduling, and league operations, along with the desire for a third-party commissioner and more educational opportunities. The name had been chosen by the time the split from the PTC was made official in June 2019.

The initial opening of conference play for many sports was put in jeopardy from the ongoing COVID-19 pandemic, with golf being the only sport to begin interscholastic at the outset in early August 2020. Later in August, it was announced by Ohio Governor Mike DeWine that all sports were allowed to compete under special guidelines outlined by the Ohio High School Athletic Association.

In November 2024, it was announced that Cuyahoga Falls, Kent Roosevelt, and Tallmadge, all members of the Suburban League American Conference, accepted invitations to join the Metro Conference beginning in the 2026–27 school year. At the same time, Coventry also announced its departure from the MAC at the conclusion of the 2025–26 school year to rejoin the Principals Athletic Conference (PAC), a conference they were part of from 1989 to 1995 and again from 2001 to 2005.

Ravenna and Springfield announced in January 2026 they will be leaving the MAC after the 2026–27 school year in favor of the newly formed Greater Portage Athletic Conference, which will begin conference play at the start of the 2027–28 school year. Cloverleaf later announced in March 2026 they plan on leaving the MAC at the conclusion of the 2027–28 school year and joining the PAC.
