= V-Rock =

V-Rock may refer to:

- WSTB, a radio station in Streetsboro, Ohio which used the "V-Rock" brand during the 1990s
- V-Rock, the name of a fictional radio station featured on the Grand Theft Auto: Vice City and Grand Theft Auto: Vice City Stories soundtracks
