= Shaun Sarrett =

American football coach (born 1979)

Jacksonville Jaguars
- Title: Offensive line coach

Personal information
- Born: December 24, 1979 (age 46); Beckley, West Virginia, U.S.

Career information
- Position: Offensive guard
- High school: Woodrow Wilson (WV)
- College: Kent State

Career history
- Streetsboro High School (OH) (2004) Offensive line coach; Marshall (2005) Defensive quality control assistant; Marshall (2006–2007) Graduate assistant; Duke (2008–2011) Offensive quality control assistant; Pittsburgh Steelers (2012–2017) Offensive assistant; Pittsburgh Steelers (2018) Assistant offensive line coach; Pittsburgh Steelers (2019–2020) Offensive line coach; Los Angeles Chargers (2021–2023) Assistant offensive line coach; Minnesota Vikings (2024) Assistant offensive line coach; Jacksonville Jaguars (2025–present) Offensive line coach

Shaun Sarrett (born December 24, 1979) is an American football coach who is currently the offensive line coach for the Jacksonville Jaguars of the National Football League (NFL). He previously served as the assistant offensive line coach for the Minnesota Vikings of the National Football League (NFL), the assistant coach for Marshall and Duke before joining the Steelers as an offensive assistant in 2012. He played college football at Kent State.

== Personal life and playing career ==
A native of Beckley, West Virginia, Sarrett played guard at Kent State University. He earned the nickname "Sweet Feet" after a teammate at Kent State noticed that his footwork was above average. He graduated from Kent State in 2004 with a degree in health education.

== Coaching career ==
After his playing career at Kent State, Sarrett received no offers to play pro football, so he decided to pursue a coaching career. He began at Streetsboro High School, a high school less than seven miles away from Kent State coaching the offensive and defensive line as well as the co-strength coach. He spent one season in that role before joining the coaching staff at Marshall in 2005, working with the defensive line as the defensive quality control and graduate assistant before switching to a graduate assistant on offense in 2006. He was hired to work at Duke in 2008 on David Cutcliffe's staff as an offensive quality control working with the offensive line.

Sarrett was hired by the Pittsburgh Steelers in 2012 as an offensive assistant. He was hired by Steelers head coach Mike Tomlin after his interview where former Kent State teammate and Steelers linebacker James Harrison recognized him and asked "What are you doing here, Sweet Feet?". He was promoted to assistant offensive line coach in 2018, and offensive line coach in 2019 after Mike Munchak left to join the Denver Broncos coaching staff. Sarrett's contract was not renewed after the 2020 season.
