= LCCS =

LCCS may refer to:

- Lake Center Christian School, located in Hartville, northwest Stark county, in northeast Ohio
- Land cover classification system, a classification system for the Earth's surface and especially its land use
- Lethal congenital contracture syndrome, a rare genetic disorder
- Lincoln Christian College and Seminary, now called Lincoln Christian University, located in Illinois
- Liquid Crystal Color Shutter, hybrid CRT/LC video display technology developed by Tektronix
