= Mike Hall Jr. =

American football player (born 2003)

Michael Hall Jr.
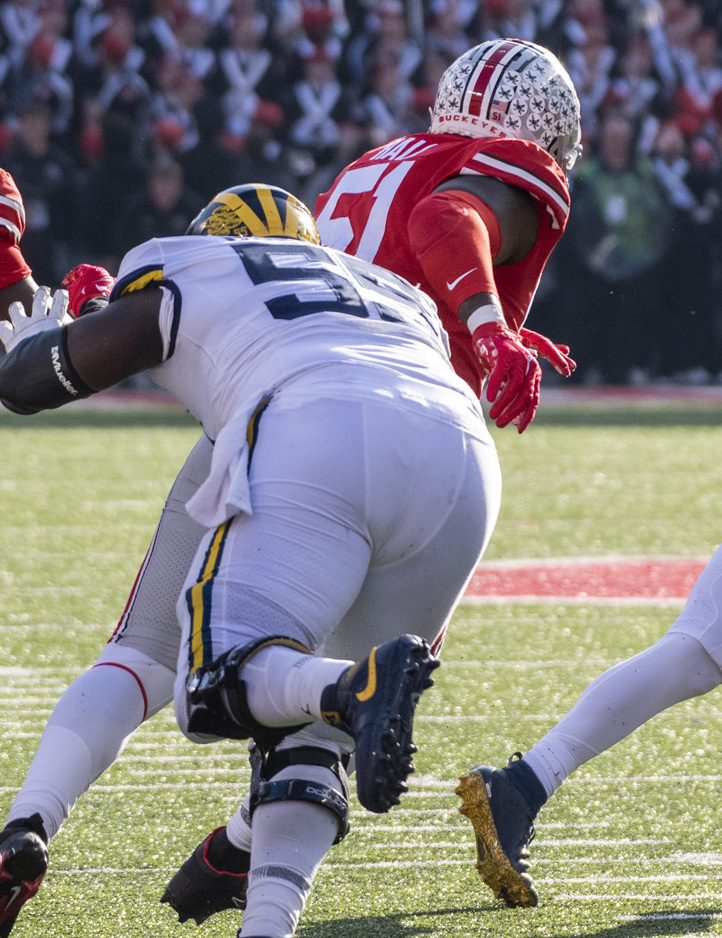
- Hall with Ohio State in 2022

No. 51 – Cleveland Browns
- Position: Defensive tackle
- Roster status: Active

Personal information
- Born: June 13, 2003 (age 23); Cleveland, Ohio, U.S.
- Listed height: 6 ft 3 in (1.91 m)
- Listed weight: 300 lb (136 kg)

Career information
- High school: Benedictine (Cleveland, Ohio) Streetsboro (Streetsboro, Ohio)
- College: Ohio State (2021–2023)
- NFL draft: 2024: 2nd round, 54th overall pick

Career history
- Cleveland Browns (2024–present)

Awards and highlights
- 2× third-team All-Big Ten (2022, 2023)

Career NFL statistics as of Week 9, 2026
- Tackles: 35
- Sacks: 4.5
- Stats at Pro Football Reference

Michael Hall Jr. (born June 13, 2003) is an American professional football defensive tackle for the Cleveland Browns of the National Football League (NFL). He played college football for the Ohio State Buckeyes.

== Early life ==
Hall grew up in Garfield Heights, Ohio & Streetsboro, Ohio and attended Benedictine High School & Streetsboro High School. As a junior, he made 72 tackles with 17 tackles for loss and five sacks. Hall was the nation’s No. 54 overall player and a 4-star rated defensive tackle as a high school senior in 2020. Hall committed to play college football at Ohio State over offers from Cincinnati, Maryland, and Penn State.

== College career ==
In 2021, Hall redshirted his true freshman season at Ohio State after playing in four games. He entered his redshirt freshman season as a starter on the Buckeyes' defensive line. Hall had four total tackles with two tackles for loss and one sack in Ohio State's 2022 season-opening win against Notre Dame. Despite limited playing time due to injury, his 7.5 tackles-for-loss for 46 yards was the teams best. Hall enters his third season with the program in 2023 where he has played in 16 games. In his career with the Buckeyes, he has amassed 19 pressures, and 5 sacks.

Statistics
Season	GP	Tackles				Interceptions					Fumbles	
Season	GP	Cmb	Solo	Ast	Sck	Int	Yds	Avg	TD	PD	FF	FR
2021	2	2	1	1	0.5	0	0	0.0	0	0	0	0
2022	12	19	9	10	4.5	0	0	0.0	0	0	0	1
2023	12	24	9	15	1.5	0	0	0.0	0	0	0	0
Career	26	45	19	26	6.5	0	0	0.0	0	0	0	1

== Professional career ==
Pre-draft measurables
Height	Weight	Arm length	Hand span	Wingspan	40-yard dash	10-yard split	20-yard split	Vertical jump	Broad jump	Bench press
6 ft 2 3/4 in (1.90 m)	290 lb (132 kg)	33 1/2 in (0.85 m)	10 in (0.25 m)	6 ft 9 1/8 in (2.06 m)	4.76 s	1.65 s	2.80 s	33.0 in (0.84 m)	9 ft 3 in (2.82 m)	25 reps
All values from NFL Combine/Pro Day

Hall Jr. was selected by the Cleveland Browns in the second round, 54th overall, of the 2024 NFL draft. He was placed on the commissioner's exempt list to start the 2024 season due to an August 2024 arrest on domestic violence charges.

== Personal life ==
On August 13, 2024, Hall was arrested in Avon, Ohio following a domestic dispute that occurred the previous night. Hall subsequently pleaded "no contest" to a reduced charge of disorderly conduct during a September 19 hearing in Avon Lake Municipal Court. The presiding judge handed him a 30-day suspended jail sentence, a $250 fine and two years monitored time. During the court hearing, Hall said "I regret this whole situation. I'm getting counseling and trying to better myself."
