= Triway High School =

Public high school located in Ohio U.S.

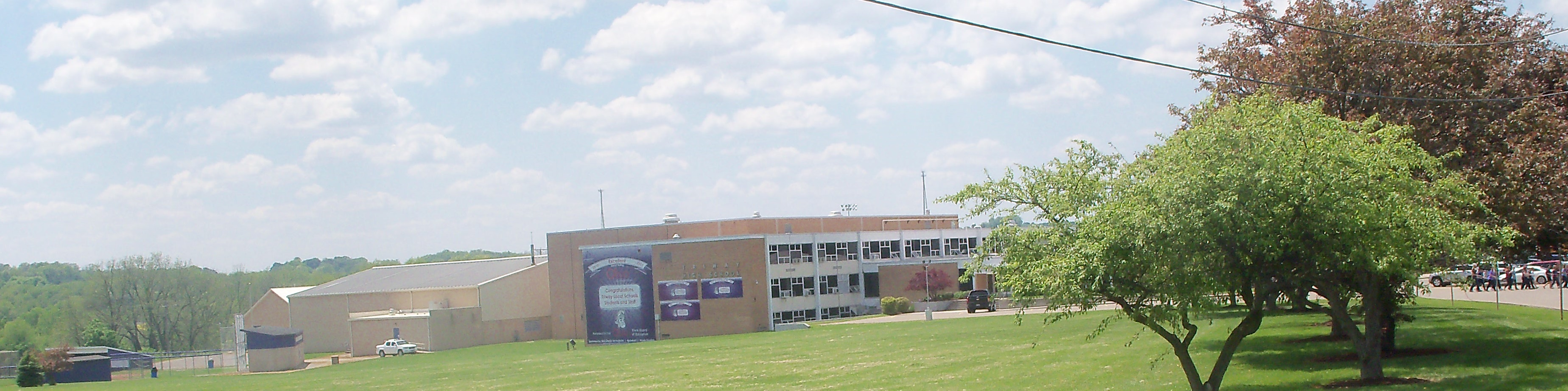

Location
- 3205 Shreve Road; Wooster, Ohio 44691; United States; 40°45′38″N 81°58′38″W

Information
- Type: Public
- Established: 1963
- School district: Triway Local School District
- NCES School ID: 390505904003
- Principal: Chris Sieber
- Faculty: 28.00 (on an FTE basis)
- Grades: 9-12
- Enrollment: 355 (2024–25)
- Student to teacher ratio: 12.68
- Campus type: Rural
- Colors: Purple and white
- Athletics conference: Principals Athletic Conference
- Team name: Titans
- Accreditation: Ohio Department of Education
- Website: www.triway.k12.oh.us

Triway High School is a public high school in Wooster Township, just south of the city of Wooster, Ohio. It is the only high school in the Triway Local School District. Athletic teams are known as the Titans and compete as a member of the Ohio High School Athletic Association in the Principals Athletic Conference. Triway primarily serves the townships of Wooster, Franklin, and Clinton, and the village of Shreve in Wayne County, Ohio.

== History ==
Triway High School was built in 1963, following the consolidations of several smaller township schools in Wooster, Franklin and Clinton townships as well as the village of Shreve in 1960.

Triway's school board proposed a new single-building plan in March 2018, consolidating the district into a PreK through 12 building. The plan was approved and construction began in November 2023. The building was finished in December 2024, with students in grades 6 through 12 moving into the building, and elementary students moving into the building in the 2025–26 school year.

== Athletics ==
Triway High School currently offers:

- Baseball
- Bowling
- Basketball
- Cheerleading
- Golf
- Gymnastics
- Football
- Soccer
- Softball
- Track and field
- Volleyball
- Wrestling

=== State championships ===
- Girls softball - 2022
- Girls bowling - 2022

== Notable alumni ==
- Josh Krajcik, former The X Factor contestant and musician
