= Norton City Schools (Ohio) =

School district in Ohio, United States

Address
- 4128 Cleveland Massillon Road Norton, Ohio, 44203; United States

District information
- Type: Public
- Grades: PK–12
- Schools: 4
- NCES District ID: 3904455

Students and staff
- Students: 2,185 (2024–2025)
- Teachers: 137.63 (on an FTE basis) (2024–2025)
- Staff: 327.23 (on an FTE basis) (2024–2025)
- Student–teacher ratio: 15.88 (2024–2025)

Other information
- Website: www.nortonschools.org

Norton City Schools is a school district headquartered in Norton, Ohio.

== Schools ==
- Norton High School
- Norton Middle School
- Norton Elementary School
- Norton Primary School

Former schools:

- Cornerstone Elementary School - demolished by 2017

== District Enrollment Figures (K-12) ==
1965	1970	1974-75	1980	1985	1990	1995	2000	2005	2010	2015	2019	2020	2023
3,503	4,114	-	3,213	2,560	2,379	2,528	2,543	2,426	2,647	2,489	2,449	2,425	2,195
