= Principals Athletic Conference =

High school athletic conference in Ohio

The Principals Athletic Conference is an Ohio High School Athletic Association athletic league that began competition in 1989 and is made up of members from Stark, Summit and Wayne Counties in Ohio.

== Members ==
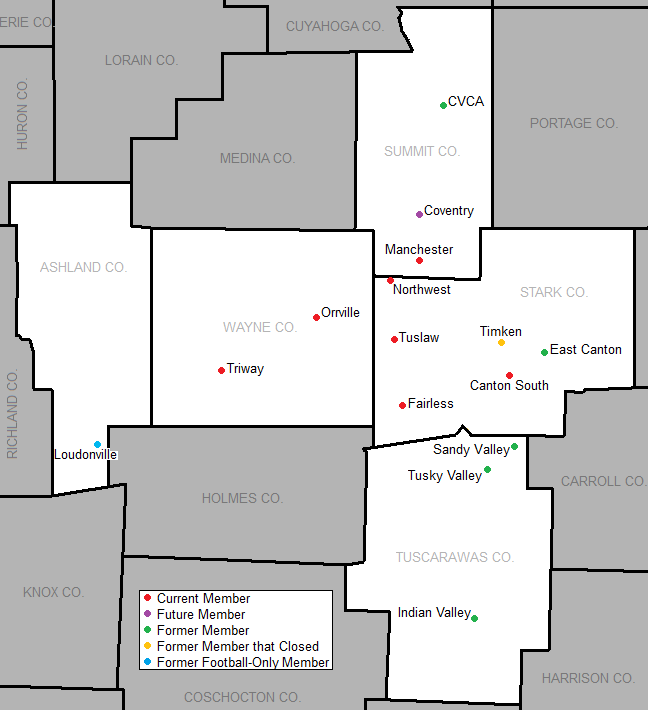
All-time members of the Principals Athletic Conference (PAC-8)

School	Nickname	Location	Colors	Tenure	Notes
Canton South	Wildcats	Canton	Red and gray	2022–	
Coventry	Comets	Coventry	Blue, gold	1989–1995;2001–2005; 2026–	
Fairless	Falcons	Navarre	Navy, silver	1989–	Leaving in 2028 for Northeast Senate League
Manchester	Panthers	New Franklin	Red, black	1989–	
Northwest	Indians	Lawrence	Red, gray, white	2017–	
Orrville	Red Riders	Orrville	Red, black, white	2016–	
Triway	Titans	Wooster	Purple, white	2005–	
Tuslaw	Mustangs	Massillon	Blue, red, white	1989–	Leaving in 2028 for Northeast Senate League

=== Future members ===
School	Nickname	Location	Colors	Year Joining	Notes
Cloverleaf	Colts	Westfield	Green, white	2028	Joining from Metro Athletic Conference
West Holmes	Knights	Millersburg	Blue, red, white	2028	Joining from Ohio Cardinal Conference

== Former members ==
School	Nickname	Location	Colors	Tenure	Notes
Cuyahoga Valley Christian Academy	Royals	Cuyahoga Falls	Blue, white	2001–2024	left for North Coast Conference
East Canton	Hornets	East Canton	Blue, gold	1989–2005	left for Portage Trail Conference
Indian Valley	Braves	Gnadenhutten	Red, blue	1992–95; 2008–2016	left for Inter-Valley Conference
Sandy Valley	Cardinals	Magnolia	Red, gray	1989–2001	Left for Inter-Valley Conference
Timken	Trojans	Canton	Blue, gold	2005–2015	School closed, consolidated with Canton McKinley
Tuscarawas Valley	Trojans	Zoarville	Red, black	1989–2016	left for Inter-Valley Conference
Loudonville	Redbirds	Loudonville	Red and gray	2017–2021	Football only member, joined Knox Morrow Athletic Conference in 2022

== History ==
The Principals Athletic Conference (also known as PAC or PAC-7) began conference play in 1989, with founding members Coventry, Fairless, Manchester, Tuslaw, East Canton, Sandy Valley, and Tuscarawas Valley. In 1992, the league expanded to eight teams following the addition of Indian Valley. Indian Valley left the league in 1995 for the East Central Ohio Conference, along with Coventry, who left in favor of becoming an independent school. The league once again expanded into seven teams in 2001 with Cuyahoga Valley Christian Academy and Coventry, who rejoined after four years of being an independent school. Sandy Valley left the same year for the Inter-Valley Conference.

East Canton and Coventry left the league in favor of the new Portage Trail Conference in 2005. That same year saw the additions of Timken and Triway. In 2008, Indian Valley rejoined the league after being in the ECOC for over 10 years. Northwest High School and Orrville High School applied for membership in the PAC in 2013, but both were later turned down after a league discussion.

Indian Valley and Tuscarawas Valley both announced in 2015 their intention of joining the Inter-Valley Conference beginning in the 2016-17 school year. The same year, Timken would shutter their school following the consolidation plan between them and Canton McKinley High School. Four schools applied to join the PAC, with two of four being accepted as full-time members. Orrville began conference play in the PAC in the 2016-17 school year, and Northwest began conference play in the 2017-18 school year. Loudonville was accepted into the league as a football only member

In 2020, Canton South, who applied to join the PAC in 2015 but was denied, accepted an invitation to join the league effective the 2022-23 school year. Loudonville forfeited their PAC membership as a football-only school and joined the Knox Morrow Athletic Conference in 2022.

Cuyahoga Valley Christian Academy announced in May 2023 their departure from the PAC to form the North Coast Conference in 2024 along with Elyria Catholic, Holy Name, Padua, Beaumont, Lake Catholic, and Notre Dame-Cathedral Latin.

Coventry confirmed that they had accepted an offer to leave the Metro Athletic Conference and rejoin the PAC and are set to rejoin the conference in 2026. Coventry was a founding member of the PAC and was a member from 1989–1995 and 2001-2005. Fairless and Tuslaw announced their intention to leave the PAC effective the 2028-29 school year for a new athletic conference with Carrollton, Claymont, Marlington, Minerva Sandy Valley, and Tuscarawas Valley all of them being former Senate League members. In March 2026, Cloverleaf and West Holmes both announced their intention of joining the PAC in 2028 to replace both Fairless and Tuslaw.
