= WSTB =

Radio station in Streetsboro, Ohio

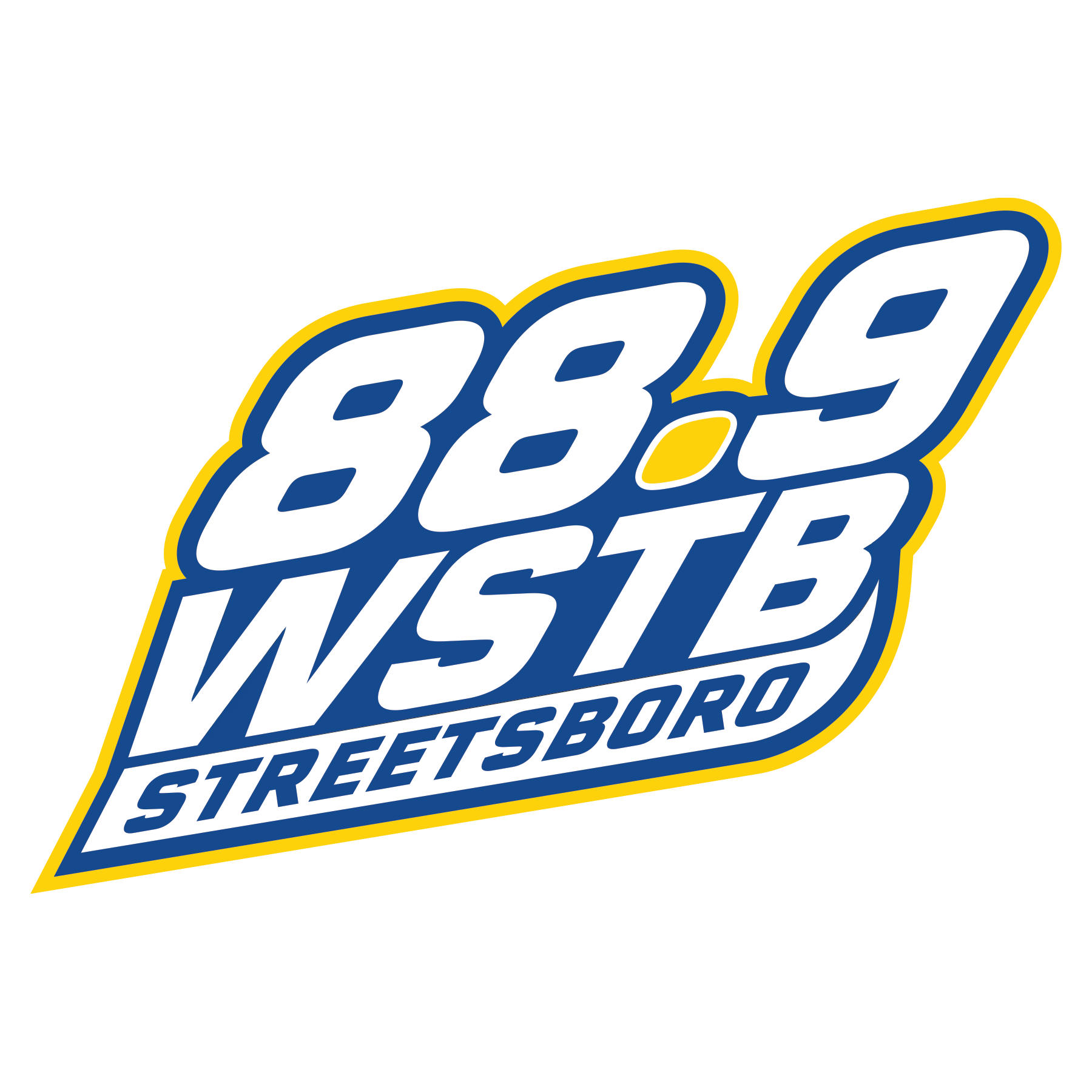
- Streetsboro, Ohio; United States
- Broadcast area: Portage County; Akron metro area
- Frequency: 88.9 MHz
- Branding: 88.9 WSTB

Programming
- Format: Alternative rock
- Affiliations: NBC News Radio

Ownership
- Owner: Streetsboro City School District

History
- First air date: March 1972
- Former frequencies: 91.5 MHz (1972–1995)
- Call sign meaning: Streetsboro

Technical information
- Licensing authority: FCC
- Facility ID: 63537
- Class: A
- ERP: 680 watts
- HAAT: 113.6 meters (373 ft)
- Transmitter coordinates: 41°09′04″N 81°20′12″W

Links
- Public license information: Public file; LMS
- Webcast: Listen live
- Website: www.rock889.com

WSTB (88.9 FM) is a non-commercial educational FM radio station licensed to Streetsboro, Ohio, United States. Owned by the Streetsboro City School District, WSTB serves Portage County and the Akron metro area. WSTB is an academic program of Streetsboro High School with the studios located there. WSTB's transmitter is on the campus of Kent State University in Kent.

== History ==
WSTB began broadcasting on March 1972 at 91.5 FM. On July 11, 1995, the station switched frequencies to 88.9 FM.

== Current programming ==
WSTB's main format is alternative rock music. The station additionally has 2 other music programs that play through weekends, such as heavy metal and oldies music.
