= F. A. Wing =

American politician (1853–1947)

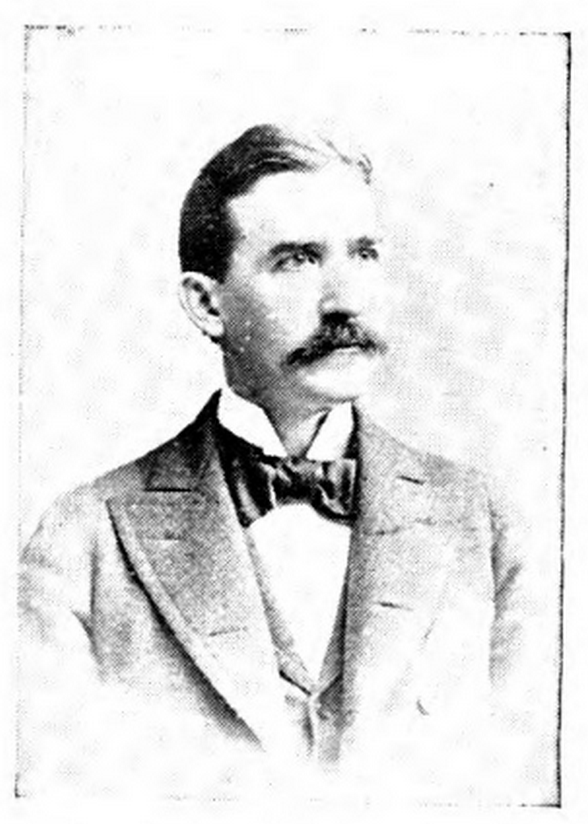

Member of the Washington House of Representatives for the 41st district
- In office 1885–1897

Personal details
- Born: January 8, 1853 Streetsboro, Ohio, United States
- Died: August 8, 1947 (aged 94) Seattle, Washington, United States
- Party: Republican

Frederick A. Wing (January 8, 1853 – August 8, 1947) was an American politician in the state of Washington. He served in the Washington House of Representatives from 1895 to 1897.
