= Northwest High School (Stark County, Ohio) =

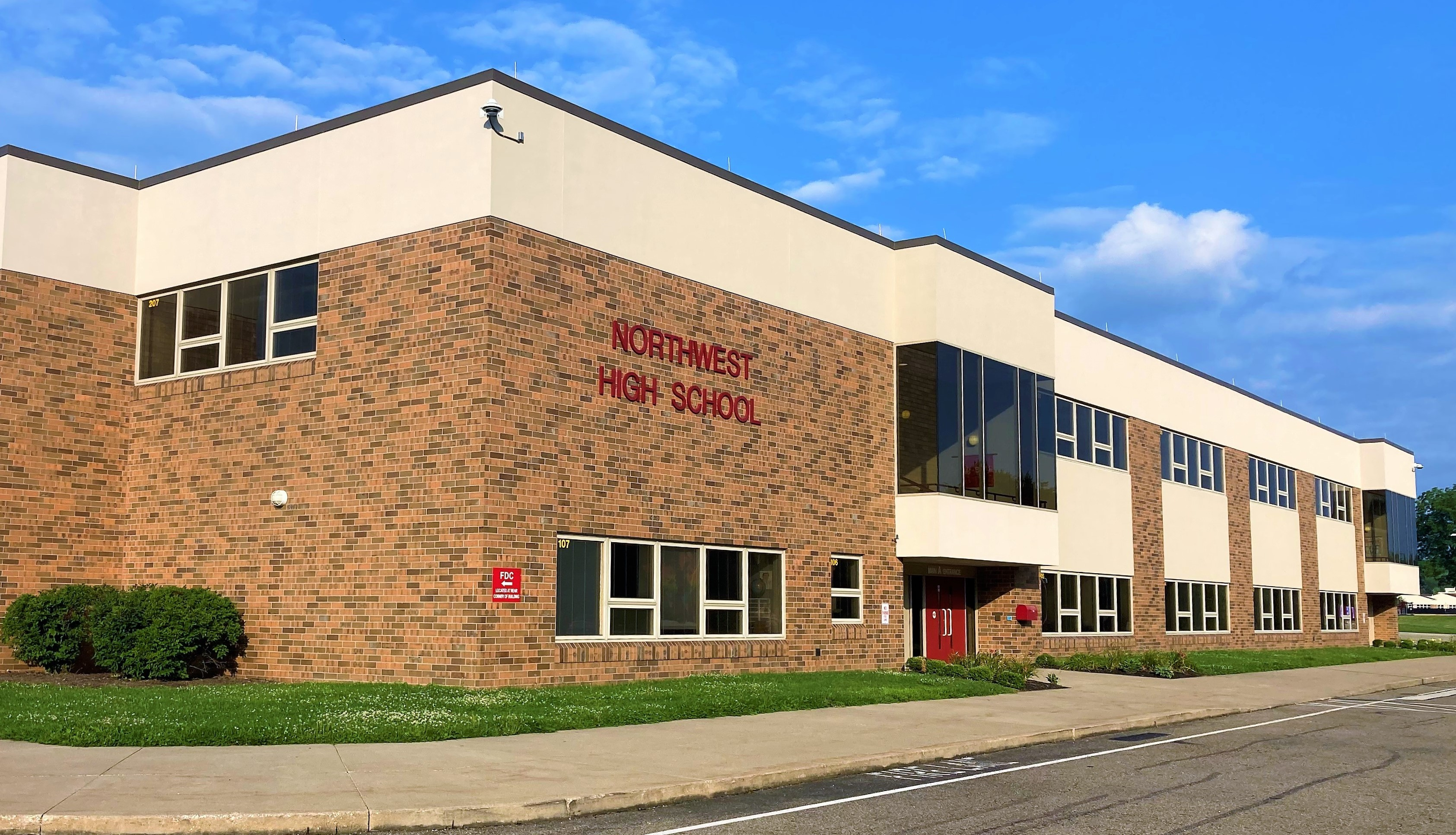

Location
- 8580 Erie Ave N Canal Fulton, Ohio 44614; United States; 40°54′30″N 81°36′57″W

Information
- Type: Public
- Founded: 1956
- School district: Northwest Local School District
- Principal: Andy Cocklin
- Teaching staff: 30.70 (FTE)
- Grades: 9–12
- Enrollment: 498 (2023-2024)
- Student to teacher ratio: 16.22
- Language: English
- Campus: Suburban
- Colors: Red, White, Gray
- Athletics conference: Principals Athletic Conference
- Team name: Indians
- Accreditation: Ohio Department of Education
- Communities served: Canal Fulton, Lawrence Township, Clinton, and parts of New Franklin
- Distinctions: Ohio Dept. of Education Excellent rating, 2010
- Website: nhs.northwest.sparcc.org

Northwest High School is a public high school in Lawrence Township, near Canal Fulton, Ohio, United States. It is the only high school in the Northwest Local Schools district. Athletic teams are nicknamed the Indians and the school colors are red, white, and gray.

== Education ==
Northwest students complete a general education requirement of 20 credit hours, in preparation for collegiate studies. The school offers 86 classes. Two physical education classes are offered. A health and an advance health course are offered. Fourteen English classes are offered at various levels and focus.

== Athletics ==
=== Wrestling ===
Between 1980 and 2015, the Northwest High School wrestling program had 32 place winners in the Ohio High School Athletic Association (OHSAA) Division II (or Class AA) State Wrestling Tournament including three State Champions, in 1989, 2001 and 2004, and nine State Runners-Up. The wrestling team won the Northeast Buckeye Conference titles in 2006, 2004 and 2003.

=== Boys' golf ===
The Northwest High School golf program placed 5th in the OHSAA Division II State Golf Tournament in 2010 while capturing 4th place in the individual results. In 2006, the team placed 7th in the State Tournament while Justin Lower won the individual Division II state championship. The team won Northeast Buckeye Conference titles in 2010, 2009, 2003, 1997 and 1996.

=== Football ===
The Northwest High School football program made nine straight OHSAA football playoff appearances from 2001 to 2009, a Stark County record. In that time span, the team won NBC championships outright in 2003 and 2007, while earning a co-championship with Alliance in 2006. In 2004, the team won the Region 11 championship and made it to the Division III Final Four in the state of Ohio. The program has featured numerous athletes that have gone on to illustrious collegiate and professional careers. The program is currently part of the Principles Athletic Conference (PAC).

=== Boys' basketball ===
The Northwest boys' basketball team was the 2004 Division II OHSAA Boys' Basketball State Runner-Up. The team won NBC co-championships in 2004 2006 and 2008, and won the NBC outright in 1998 and 1997.

=== Boys' soccer ===
The Northwest High School boys' soccer team earned eight NBC league titles in ten seasons spanning 1993–2002, winning in 2002, 2000, 1999, 1998, 1997, 1996, 1994 and 1993. The team made the State Championship in 1998 earning the Division II OHSAA, Boys' Soccer State Runner-Up.

== Notable alumni ==
- Justin Lower, professional golfer
- Mary Murphy, American ballroom dance champion, choreographer, and judge on Fox's So You Think You Can Dance
