= Lake Center Christian School =

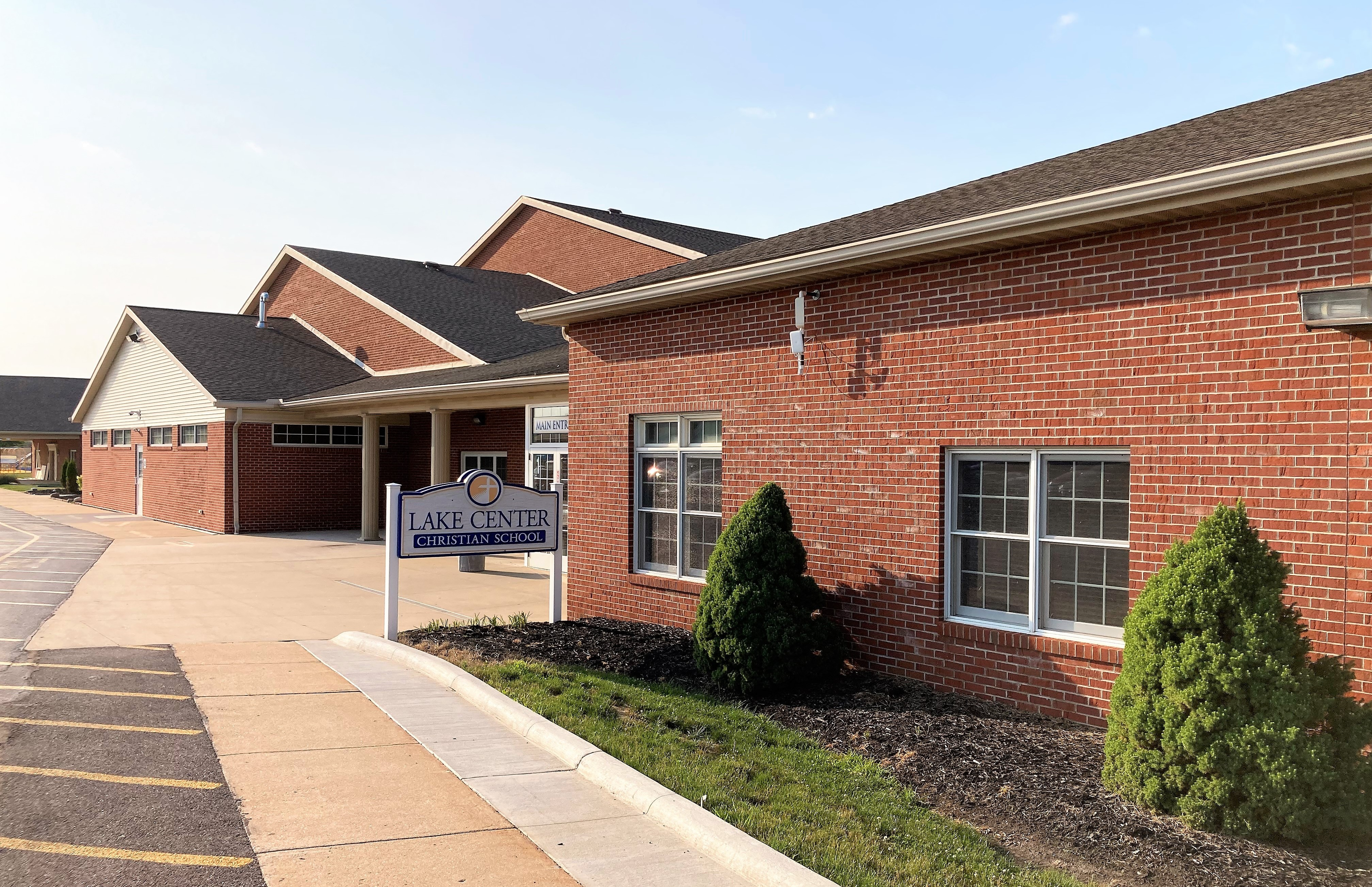

Location
- 12893 Kaufman Ave NW; Hartville, Ohio 44632; United States
- 40°58′38″N 81°22′15″W

Information
- School type: Private Christian
- Motto: "Glorifying God through a Christian Community of Excellence"
- Established: 1947; 2003 (high school)
- Superintendent: Tim McAboy
- CEEB code: 365120
- Principal: Crystal Maarschalk (Secondary); Jennifer Neel (Elementary)
- Teaching staff: 80.3 (FTE) (2023–24)
- Grades: K–12
- Enrollment: 872 (2023–24)
- Student to teacher ratio: 10.9 (2023–24)
- Campus type: Rural
- Colors: Blue and Gold
- Mascot: Tiberius The Tiger
- Team name: Tigers
- Publication: The Light
- Yearbook: Reflections
- Website: www.lccs.com

Lake Center Christian School is a private Christian school in Lake Township, between Uniontown and Hartville, Ohio, United States. The school teaches students from kindergarten through 12th grade and is no longer affiliated with the Mennonite Church USA, but continues to be based on Mennonite principles. The school is accredited by the Association of Christian Schools International and Cognia.

== History ==
Lake Center was established on September 15, 1947 with 183 students. High school grades were added beginning in 2003 with the first graduating class in 2007, a class of 34 students.

In the summer of 2013 the school began fundraising in order to build the "cafenasium," a multifunctional addition that would serve as a cafeteria and a gymnasium, amongst other things. In May 2016, construction of the project commenced with a groundbreaking ceremony. The project was officially completed in 2020.

== Athletics ==
Lake Center Christian competes in the Ohio High School Athletic Association (OHSAA) as an independent, and fields teams in baseball, basketball, cheerleading, golf, soccer, softball, cross country, track and field, bowling, and volleyball. From 2015 to 2025, LCC was a member of the Portage Trail Conference.

=== State championships ===
- Baseball – 2026

== Notable alumni ==
- Reggie Stoltzfus, former member of the Ohio House of Representatives (did not graduate because LCCS did not have a high school at the time)
