= Norton High School (Ohio) =

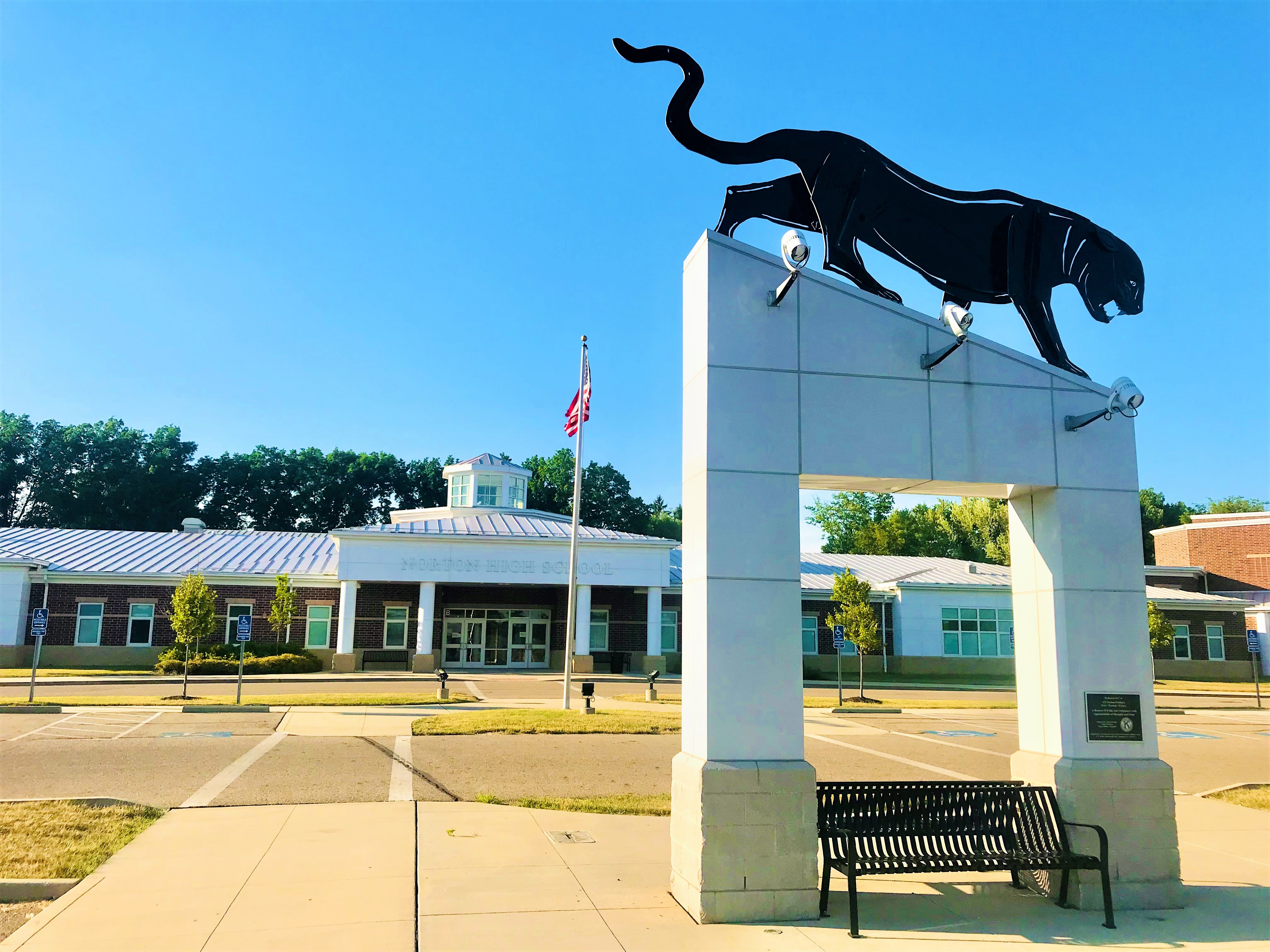

Location
- 1 Panther Way; Norton, Ohio 44203; United States; 41.0346097°N 81.64220979999999°W

Information
- School type: Public, secondary school
- Motto: "Every Child, Every Day"
- School district: Norton City School District
- Principal: Ryan Shanor
- Staff: 57.50 (FTE)
- Grades: 9–12
- Enrollment: 715 (2023–2024)
- Student to teacher ratio: 12.43
- Language: English
- Campus: Suburban
- Colors: Red, white, black
- Athletics conference: Metro Athletic Conference
- Team name: Panthers
- Rival: Coventry Comets
- Accreditation: Ohio Department of Education
- Yearbook: The Nortonian
- Communities served: Norton
- Distinctions: Ohio Dept. of Education Excellent rating
- Website: nortonschools.org/nortonhighschool_home.aspx

Norton High School is a public high school in Norton, Ohio, United States, and the only high school in the Norton City School District. Athletic teams are known as the Panthers with school colors of red and white (also can be black). They are one of the 8 schools who compete in the Metro Athletic Conference. The 141,000 square feet (13,100 m^{2}) building opened in January 2017, replacing the previous home of Norton High School, built in 1953. The former high school building was re-purposed as Norton Middle School. The campus includes athletic fields and a multi-purpose stadium, which opened in September 2015. The stadium has an artificial surface for football and soccer and an eight-lane all-weather track.

== State championships ==
- Boys Golf – 1964
- Boys Shot Put - 1998
- Girls Shot Put - 2021

== Music programs ==
Norton High School offers multiple music ensembles including a marching band, concert band, jazz band, and a choir. The marching band, with approximately 70 members, participates regularly in events around the region in Bands of America and Ohio Music Education Association (OMEA) events, including the Bands of America Grand National Championships in Indianapolis, Indiana, and has regularly attended OMEA’s state finals events, and Grand Nationals semifinals in 2012, 2014, 2017, 2018, and 2019. The concert band and the choir regularly participate in OMEA events in the area as well.
