= Streetsboro City School District =

School district in Ohio, United States

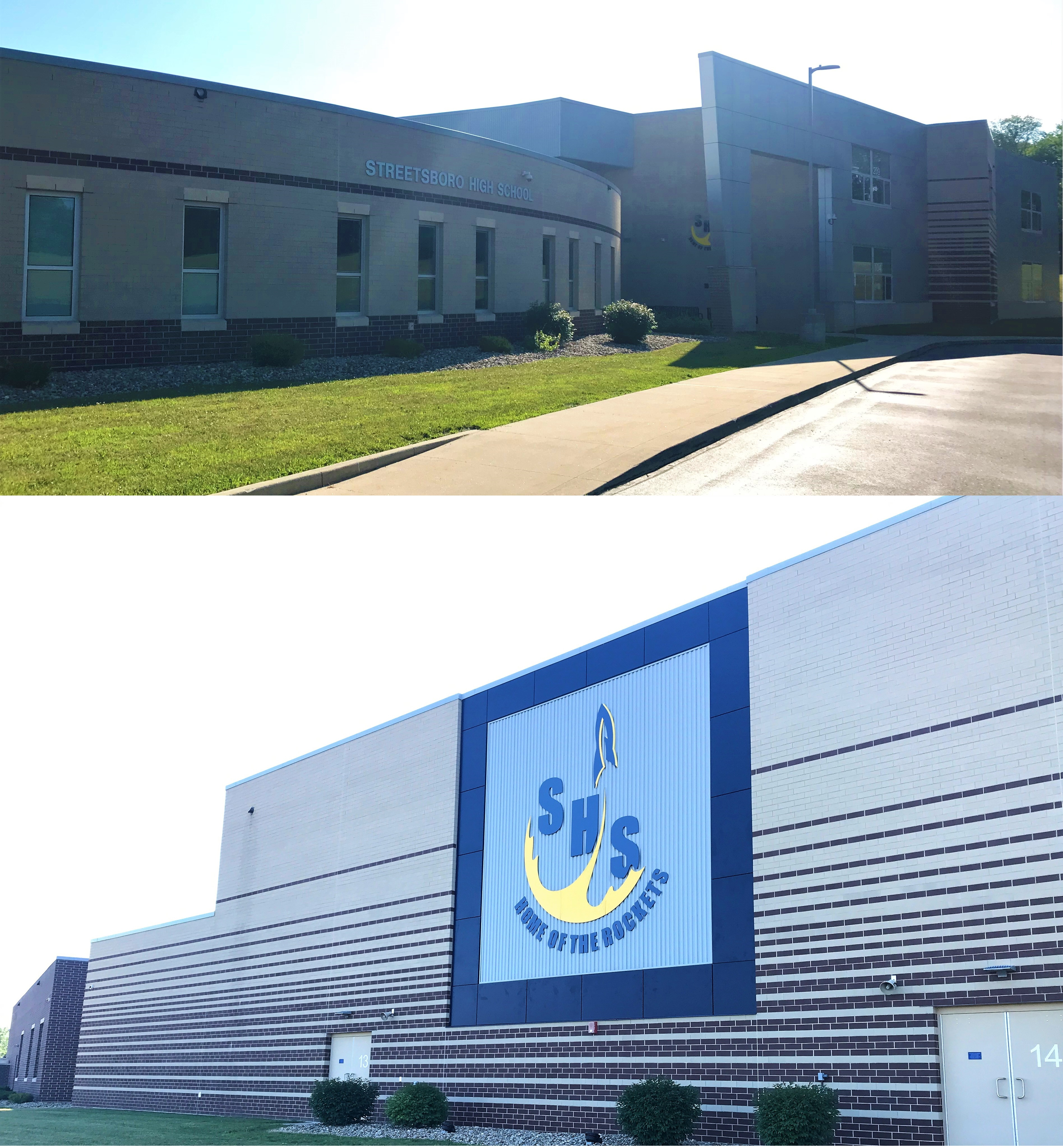

Address
- 9000 Kirby Lane Streetsboro, Ohio, 44241; United States

District information
- Type: Public, coeducational
- Grades: PK–12
- Established: 1902
- Accreditation: Ohio Department of Education
- NCES District ID: 3904923

Students and staff
- Enrollment: 1,905 (2024–25)
- Staff: 122.90 (FTE)
- Student–teacher ratio: 15.50
- District mascot: Rockets
- Colors: Blue; Gold

Other information
- Website: Official website

The Streetsboro City School District is a public school district located in Streetsboro, Ohio, United States. The school district consists of one high school, one middle school, and two elementary schools.

== History ==
Streetsboro City School District was established in 1902 when the Streetsboro Township schools consolidated to a central building from one-room schoolhouses. The Streetsboro Township School would house the high school and all grades in Streetsboro until 1950, when it was replaced by a new school, later called Wise Elementary School. Wise was adjacent to the original building and was planned to house all 12 grade levels. At that time, however, the Ohio Department of Education revoked the high school charter, so high school students were initially sent to Aurora High School in neighboring Aurora, before eventually being sent to Davey Junior High School and Theodore Roosevelt High School in Kent. This arrangement continued until 1962, when the school was re-established at the opening of a new high school building on Annalane Drive. The class of 1964 was the first class to graduate from Streetsboro since 1950, while the class of 1965 was the first to have attended all years of schooling in Streetsboro since the class of 1950.

The building on Annalane Drive had several additions, both to the building and to the adjacent campus. In the late 1960s, Campus Elementary School and Streetsboro Middle School were built on the campus, with Henry Defer Intermediate School opening in 2004. The most recent additions to the building included a new science wing in the early 2000s, followed by eight modular classrooms later that decade. A fire in June 2010 caused approximately $2 million in water, smoke, and structural damage, mainly to the gymnasium. The fire forced the district to shut down the school for the remainder of the school year. Because repairs to the gymnasium were not completed until early March 2011, the boys basketball team played home games that season at the old Ravenna High School in nearby Ravenna, which had recently been vacated.

The current high school building and campus is located along Ohio State Route 14, and was approved by voters in November 2013 as part of a bond issue that included additions and updates to other district buildings. The 117,570 square feet (10,923 m^{2}) building was completed in December 2016, with an open house and dedication on December 17. The first classes were held at the facility January 3, 2017. The building is sustainably designed with the Leadership in Energy and Environmental Design (LEED) Silver certification. Included in the new building is an 800-seat auditorium, 800-seat gymnasium, outdoor courtyard, radio studio, and a TV studio, along with athletic fields and new stadium complex. The former high school building on Annalane Drive was partially demolished, renovated, and reconfigured to house students in grades 6–8. It reopened as Streetsboro Middle School in 2018.

== Schools ==
=== High school ===
- Streetsboro High School, grades 9–12

=== Middle school ===
- Streetsboro Middle School, grades 6–8

=== Elementary schools ===
- Henry Defer Intermediate School, grades 4–5
- Streetsboro Elementary School, grades Pre-K–3
