= Norton, Ohio =

- City
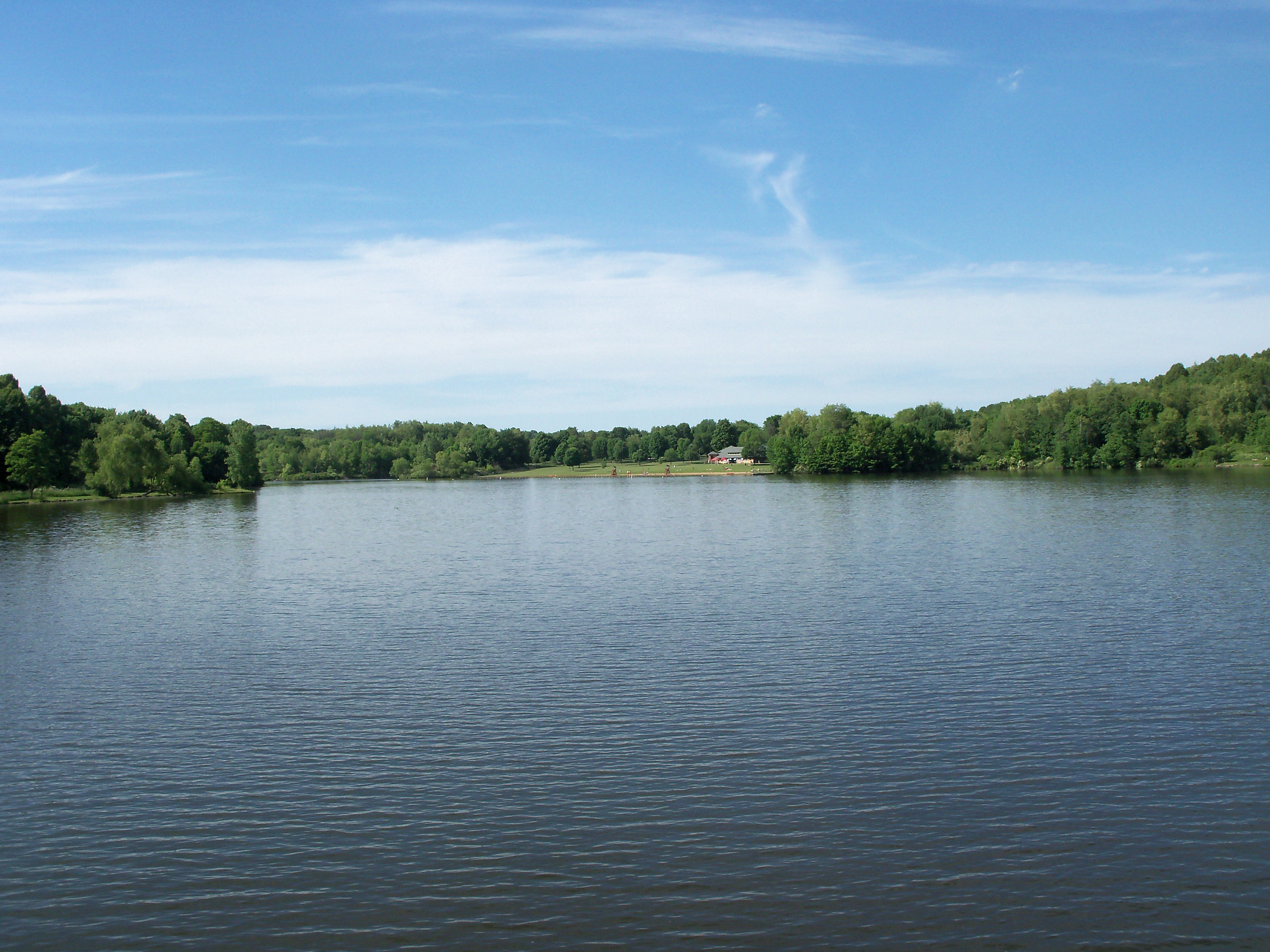
- Silver Creek Metropark is located in Norton
- Interactive map of Norton, Ohio
- Location within Ohio Location within the United States
- Coordinates: 41°01′45″N 81°38′46″W
- Country: United States
- State: Ohio
- Counties: Summit, Wayne

Government
  - Type: Mayor-council
  - Mayor: Mike Zita

Area
  - Total: 20.51 sq mi (53.13 km^{2})
  - Land: 20.19 sq mi (52.28 km^{2})
  - Water: 0.32 sq mi (0.84 km^{2})
- Elevation: 1,106 ft (337 m)

Population (2020)
  - Total: 11,673
  - Density: 578.2/sq mi (223.26/km^{2})
- Time zone: UTC-5 (Eastern (EST))
  - Summer (DST): UTC-4 (EDT)
- ZIP code: 44203
- Area codes: 330, 234
- FIPS code: 39-57260
- GNIS feature ID: 1087012
- Website: cityofnorton.org

Norton is a city in southwestern Summit County, Ohio, United States, with a 4.4-acre (1.8 ha) district extending into Wayne County. The population was 11,673 at the 2020 census. It is part of the Akron metropolitan area.

== History ==
In 1818, Norton Township was organized as a part of Wolf Creek Township which consisted of present-day Norton, Copley, Wadsworth, Sharon, Guilford, and Montville townships. Norton Township was plotted into lots half a square mile after being surveyed by Joseph Darrow. Norton was known as Town 1, Range 12 of the Western Reserve. It was named after Birdseye Norton, one of the original owners of the township. The first two people to settle on this land, in 1810, were James Robinson and John Cahow. Robinson purchased lot 19 and Cahow lot 20. The first marriage in the township was in the fall of 1814 between James Robinson and Lois Bates. The first tavern was built by John Cahow on his lot 20 in 1812. The first saw and grist mills were built by Thomas Johnson in 1823 (saw) and 1830 (grist). Norton Township consisted of seven small villages: Loyal Oak (also known as Bates' Corners, located at 261 & Cleveland-Massillon Rd), Western Star (Greenwich and Medina Line Roads), Sherman (Originally known as Dennison located at Hametown Rd & Sherman St), Johnson's Corners (31st St and Wooster Rd W), Norton Center (Cleveland-Massillon & Greenwich Rd & Norton Ave), Hametown (Hametown and Wooster Roads), and New Portage (Wooster Rd N & Norton Ave.).

One of Norton's famous families is the Seiberling family; Frank A. and Charles W. Seiberling started the Goodyear tire and rubber company in 1898. The Seiberling farm is still in operation today on Greenwich Road at Knollbrook Drive. In 1890, Ohio Columbus Barber, Charles Baird, Albert T. Paige and John K. Robinson purchased a number of farms adjacent to New Portage. Their purchase was for the purpose of founding a new manufacturing city. This city was named Barberton after O. C. Barber. The Ohio & Erie Canal ran through the southeastern part of the township from 1827–1913. In 1905, electric trolley lines were installed in Norton, from Barberton to Wadsworth. In 1958 the Norton Township Development Committee was formed. Residents believed the Township form of government, with its three Trustees, needed a more structured form of government to effectively meet the needs of a fast-growing community. After time, an issue to incorporate as a village was placed on the election ballot. Although defeated the first time, it passed in 1961, thus incorporating Norton as a village. Norton's first Village Mayor was Richard DuFore. The General Election of November 1968, brought Norton to a City status. The former Norton Village officially assumed City status on January 11, 1969. Norton's current government consists of Mayor Mike Zita and council members: Doug DeHarpart, Jamie Lukens, Don Harbert, Paul Tousley, Judith Lynn Lee, Bill Mowery, and Paul Eader.

== Geography ==
Norton is located in Summit County, with a small portion containing several parcels in Wayne County.

According to the United States Census Bureau, the city has a total area of 20.49 square miles (53.07 km^{2}), of which, 20.16 square miles (52.21 km^{2}) is land and 0.33 square miles (0.85 km^{2}) is water.

== Demographics ==
Historical population
| Census | Pop. | Note | %± |
|---|---|---|---|
| 1970 | 12,308 | | — |
| 1980 | 12,242 | | −0.5% |
| 1990 | 11,477 | | −6.2% |
| 2000 | 11,523 | | 0.4% |
| 2010 | 12,085 | | 4.9% |
| 2020 | 11,673 | | −3.4% |
| 2025 (est.) | 11,493 | | −1.5% |

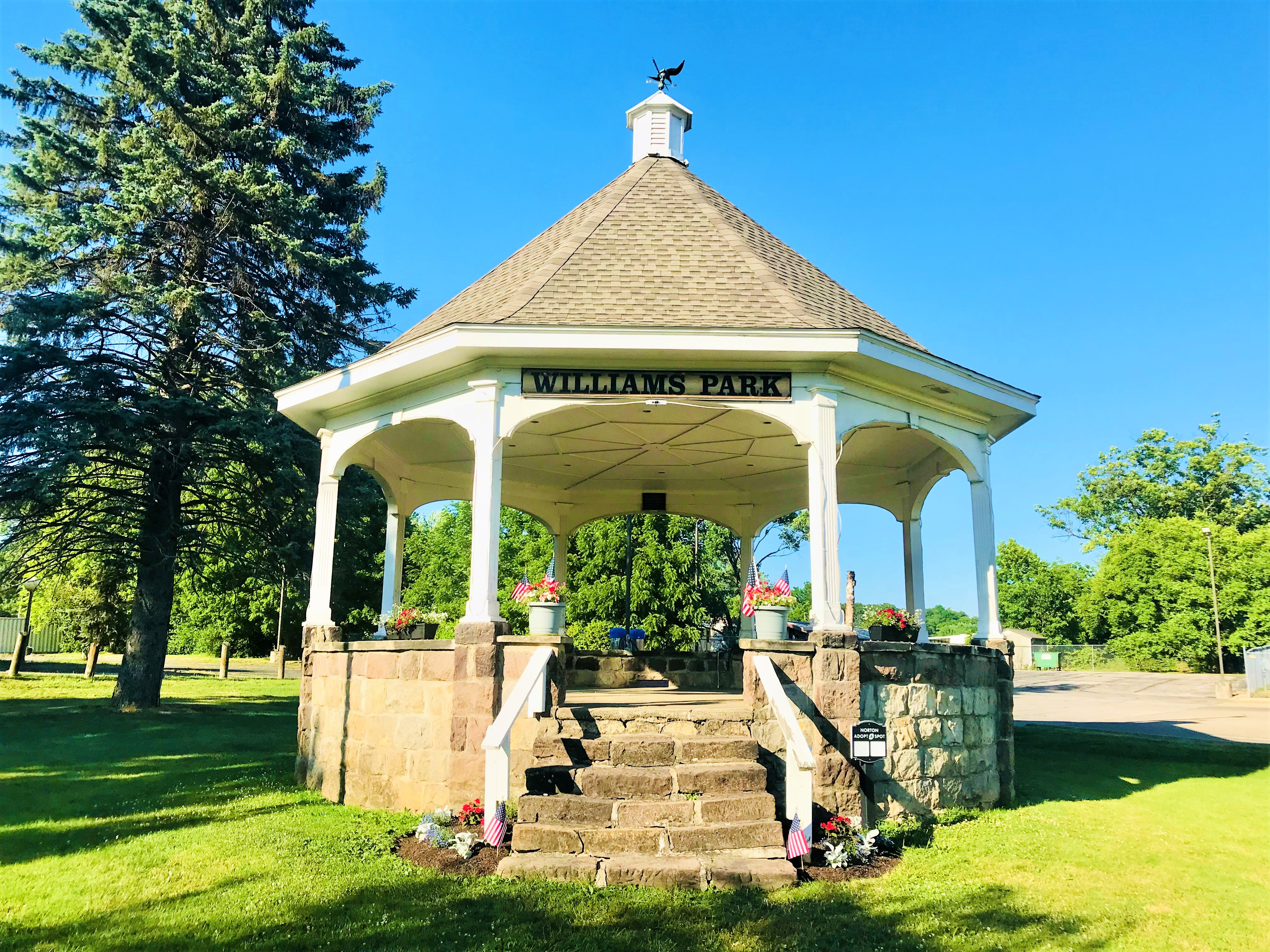
Gazebo at Williams Park at the Town Center

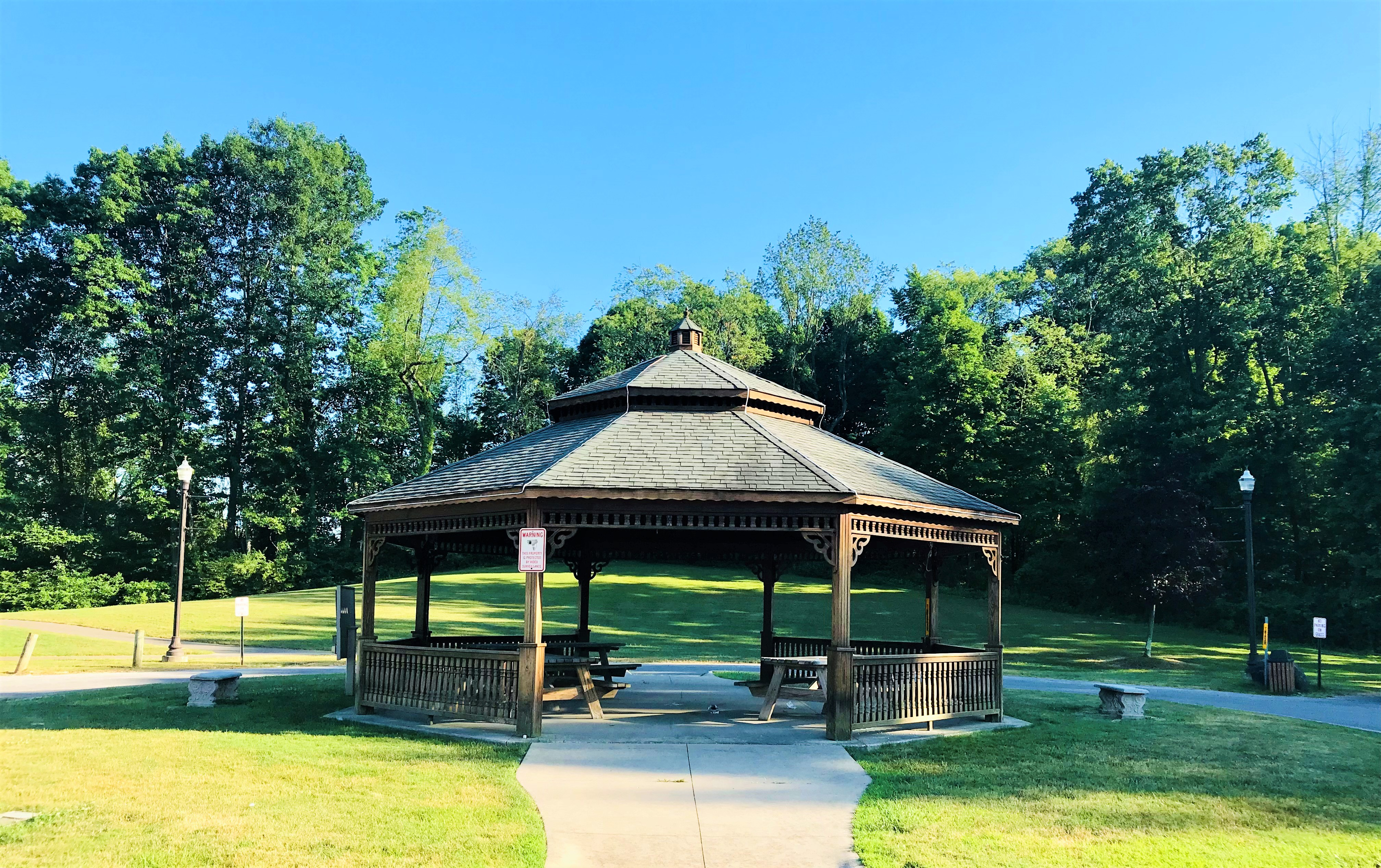
Gazebo at Columbia Woods Park

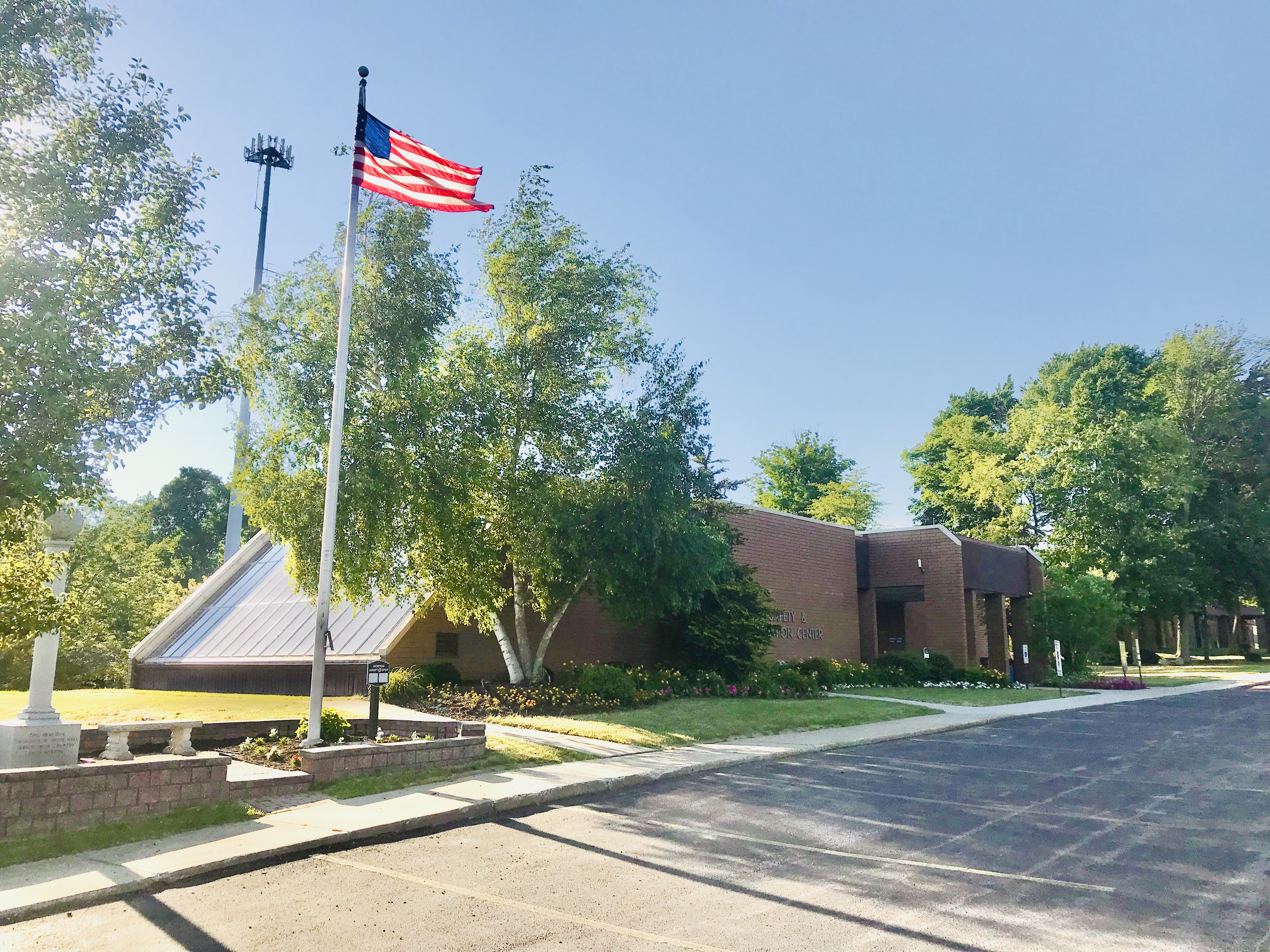
Safety and Administration Center

=== 2020 census ===
As of the 2020 census, Norton had a population of 11,673. The median age was 45.2 years. 20.5% of residents were under the age of 18 and 20.6% of residents were 65 years of age or older. For every 100 females there were 102.4 males, and for every 100 females age 18 and over there were 99.2 males age 18 and over.

93.2% of residents lived in urban areas, while 6.8% lived in rural areas.

There were 4,701 households in Norton, of which 26.9% had children under the age of 18 living in them. Of all households, 56.3% were married-couple households, 17.2% were households with a male householder and no spouse or partner present, and 19.8% were households with a female householder and no spouse or partner present. About 23.7% of all households were made up of individuals and 12.0% had someone living alone who was 65 years of age or older.

There were 4,917 housing units, of which 4.4% were vacant. The homeowner vacancy rate was 0.9% and the rental vacancy rate was 7.6%.

Racial composition as of the 2020 census
| Race | Number | Percent |
|---|---|---|
| White | 10,720 | 91.8% |
| Black or African American | 212 | 1.8% |
| American Indian and Alaska Native | 15 | 0.1% |
| Asian | 112 | 1.0% |
| Native Hawaiian and Other Pacific Islander | 0 | 0.0% |
| Some other race | 75 | 0.6% |
| Two or more races | 539 | 4.6% |
| Hispanic or Latino (of any race) | 157 | 1.3% |

=== 2010 census ===
As of the census of 2010, there were 12,085 people, 4,711 households, and 3,439 families living in the city. The population density was 599.5 inhabitants per square mile (231.5/km^{2}). There were 4,951 housing units at an average density of 245.6 per square mile (94.8/km^{2}). The racial makeup of the city was 96.2% White, 1.7% African American, 0.2% Native American, 0.8% Asian, 0.1% Pacific Islander, 0.1% from other races, and 1.0% from two or more races. Hispanic or Latino of any race were 0.9% of the population.

There were 4,711 households, of which 29.7% had children under the age of 18 living with them, 59.4% were married couples living together, 9.0% had a female householder with no husband present, 4.6% had a male householder with no wife present, and 27.0% were non-families. 22.4% of all households were made up of individuals, and 9.5% had someone living alone who was 65 years of age or older. The average household size was 2.53 and the average family size was 2.96.

The median age in the city was 43.7 years. 21.8% of residents were under the age of 18; 7.1% were between the ages of 18 and 24; 23.1% were from 25 to 44; 31.9% were from 45 to 64; and 16.1% were 65 years of age or older. The gender makeup of the city was 49.3% male and 50.7% female.

=== 2000 census ===
As of the census of 2000, there were 11,523 people, 4,343 households, and 3,361 families living in the city. The population density was 572.8 inhabitants per square mile (221.2/km^{2}). There were 4,523 housing units at an average density of 224.8 per square mile (86.8/km^{2}). The racial makeup of the city was 97.35% White, 1.34% African American, 0.17% Native American, 0.28% Asian, 0.03% Pacific Islander, 0.14% from other races, and 0.69% from two or more races. Hispanic or Latino of any race were 0.41% of the population.

There were 4,343 households, out of which 31.0% had children under the age of 18 living with them, 65.9% were married couples living together, 8.5% had a female householder with no husband present, and 22.6% were non-families. 19.3% of all households were made up of individuals, and 9.0% had someone living alone who was 65 years of age or older. The average household size was 2.64 and the average family size was 3.01.

In the city the population was spread out, with 24.5% under the age of 18, 6.9% from 18 to 24, 27.4% from 25 to 44, 25.9% from 45 to 64, and 15.3% who were 65 years of age or older. The median age was 40 years. For every 100 females, there were 96.6 males. For every 100 females age 18 and over, there were 95.6 males.

The median income for a household in the city was $47,085, and the median income for a family was $50,737. Males had a median income of $38,289 versus $25,687 for females. The per capita income for the city was $20,661. About 4.3% of families and 5.9% of the population were below the poverty line, including 7.1% of those under age 18 and 4.4% of those age 65 or over.

== Arts and culture ==
The city holds a yearly Apple Cider Festival in September. It includes a parade, fireworks, crafts and attractions. Begun by the Lions Club in 1988, the family members thought about starting an Octoberfest, but decided that since the Lions were known for selling cider in the Loyal Oak area of the City, that a Cider Festival would best suit the residents of that area. On September 23 and 24, 1989, the first Cider Festival was held as a local community event. For the 20th Anniversary in 2008, the location of the Festival was changed to be held closer to the City center at the Columbia Woods Park complex. The City is also home to the Wolf Creek Players, a local, community theater group that presents three productions per season. Proceeds are used for future productions and scholarships.

== Education ==
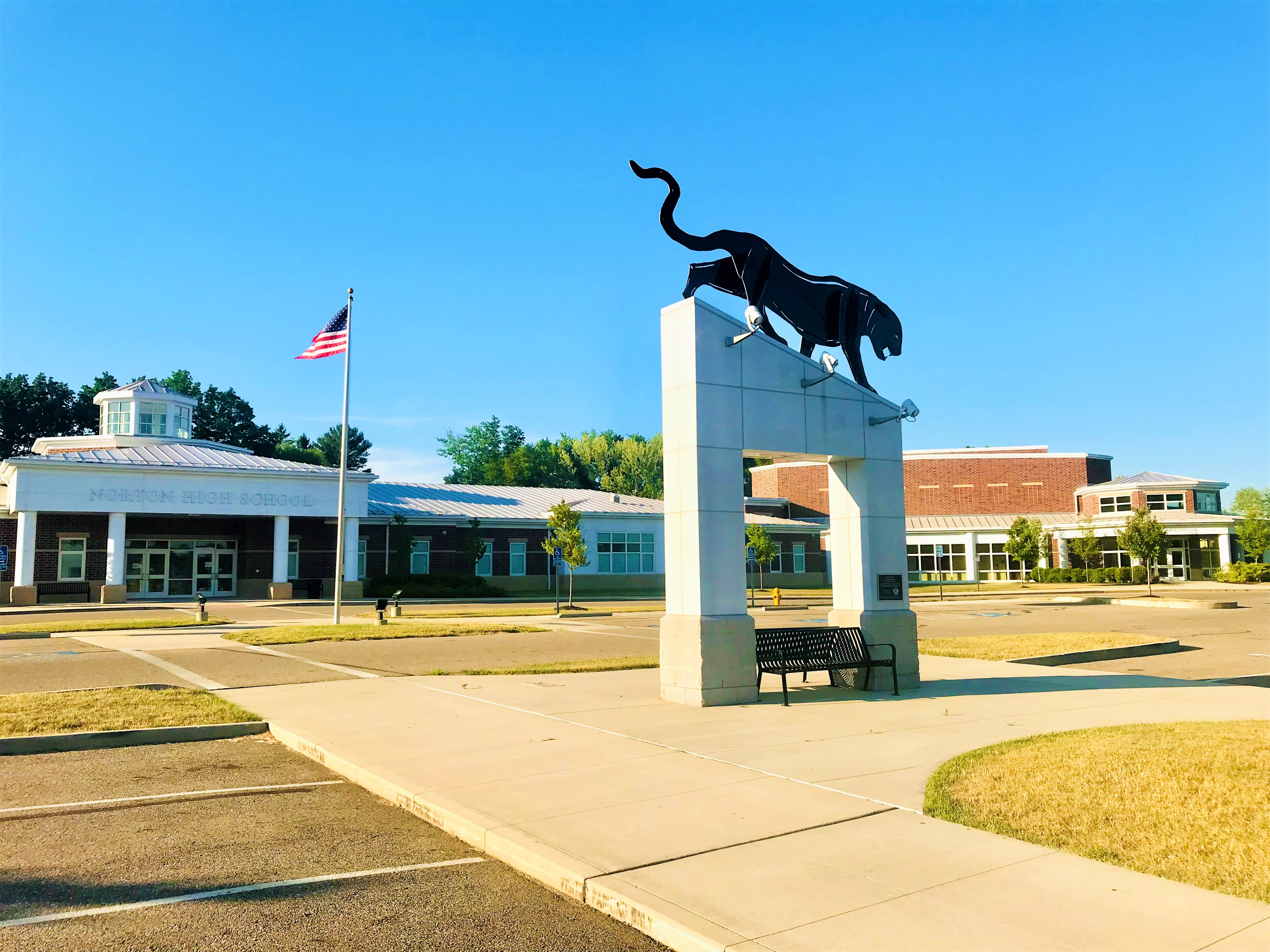
Norton High School

Norton City School District operates one elementary school, one middle school, and Norton High School.

Norton has a public library, a branch of the Akron-Summit County Public Library.

== Infrastructure ==
Norton operates a police department and a fire department with one fire station.

== Notable people ==
- Martha Parmelee Rose (1834–1923), journalist, reformer and philanthropist
- Tyler Scott, professional football player
