= Coventry High School (Ohio) =

Secondary school near Akron, Ohio, United States

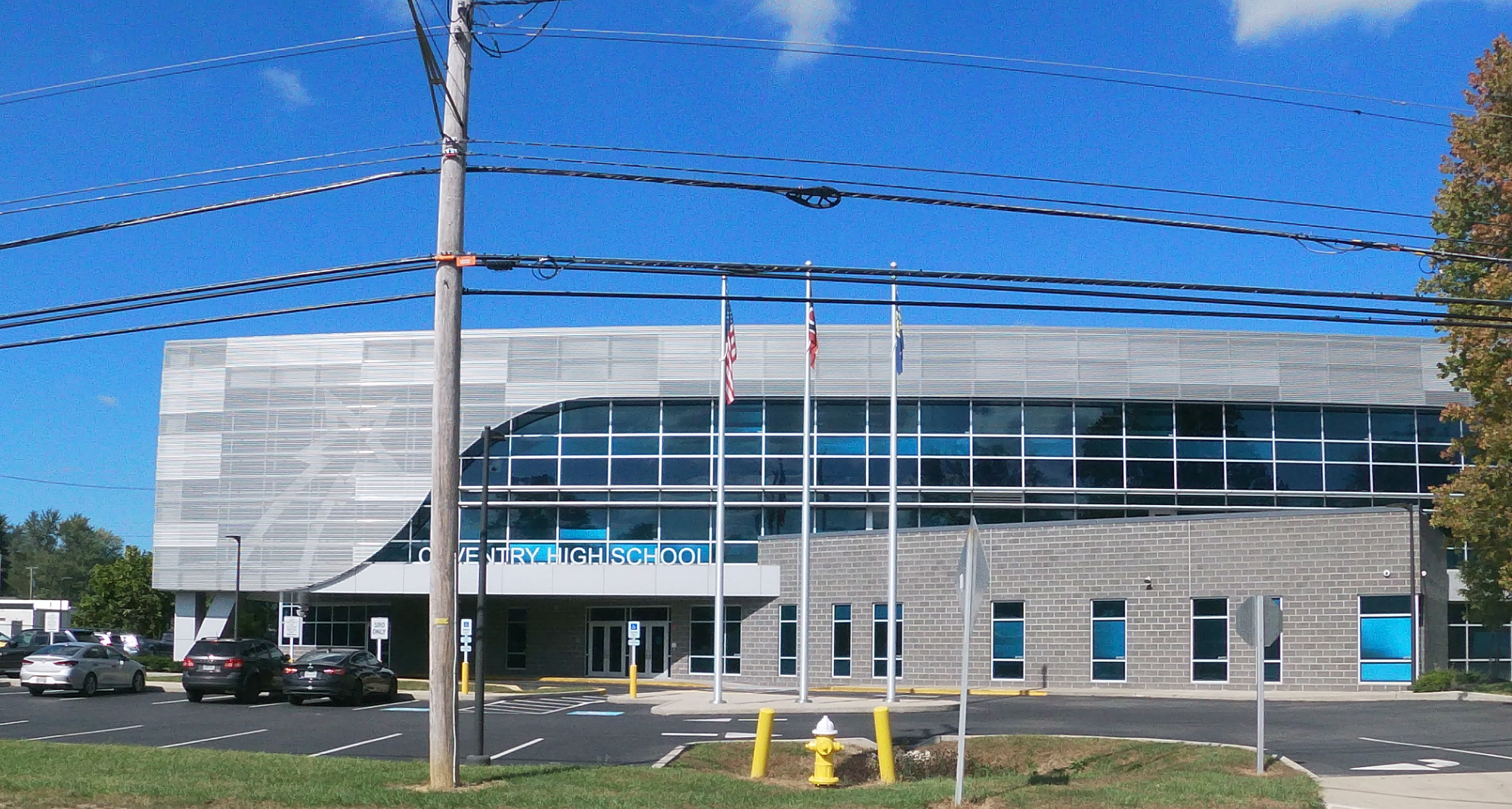
- Coventry High School, 2021

Location
- 1135 Portage Lakes Drive; Akron, Ohio 44319; United States
- Coordinates: 41°0′24.27″N 81°33′13.23″W

Information
- School type: Public, secondary school
- School district: Coventry Local School District
- Principal: Tina Norris
- Teaching staff: 39.00 (FTE)
- Grades: 9–12
- Enrollment: 540 (2023–2024)
- Student to teacher ratio: 13.85
- Language: English
- Campus: Suburban
- Colors: Blue and gold
- Athletics conference: Principals Athletic Conference
- Team name: Coventry Comets
- Rivals: Norton Panthers
- Accreditation: Ohio Department of Education
- Communities served: Coventry Township; Northern New Franklin
- Website: coventryschools.org/coventryhighschool_home.aspx

Coventry High School is a public high school located in Coventry Township, near Akron, Ohio, United States. It is the only high school in the Coventry Local School District.

== State championships ==
- Boys wrestling – 1978, 1979, 1980, 1993, 1996

== History ==
Coventry High School was formerly known as Coventry Township High School. In 1994, Coventry school's purchased an entertainment complex known as Jackie Lee's for $4 million to house its high school students. The complex had a 40 lane bowling alley, a fitness center, restaurant size kitchen, a full size theater, an outdoor pool area, as well as multiple dance clubs and arcade areas. The district renovated the building into a school. That plan was that the bowling alley and fitness center would fund and offset the operational costs of the building. However, the district was forced to close the bowling alley after a $250,000 deficit. The fitness center maintained operation for a time after that, first being leased by the YMCA, then later Snap Fitness. Currently it is unoccupied and used for storage.

== Renovations ==
In 2011, Coventry Local Schools conducted a plan to remodel the bowling alley at the high school into classrooms. Following the completion, Lakeview Elementary was closed, moving the district from five buildings to four. Plans to remodel Coventry High School opened up the opportunity to put the freshman class back at Coventry High School, which previously housed grades 10–12. Plans to build a gym at the high school were turned down by the community. On May 7, 2013, Coventry voters accepted a Bond/PI levy to build a brand new high school on the current intermediate school property with the demolition of that building. The passage of this levy allowed the district to not only build a new school but renovate the current middle school and former high school. The former high school was retro-fitted into a k-4 elementary building boasting a new gymnasium and a new bus garage. The middle school will remain grades 5–8 with multiple renovations and classroom additions. Coventry plans on roof updates, windows, heating and A/C, as well as multiple cosmetic updates. This bond allowed the district to consolidate into three buildings with the closing of Turkeyfoot elementary school after the completion of the new high school. All district offices were then moved over to the old Lakeview Elementary building which is currently being leased out. All these projects were completed by 2016-2017 and costed roughly 39.3 million.

== Notable alumni ==
- James Harrison - former professional football player; 2008 NFL Defensive Player of the Year, actor
- Chris "Drama" Pfaff - television personality; "Drama" from Rob & Big and Rob Dyrdek's Fantasy Factory
- Ron Rector - American football player
