= Streetsboro, Ohio =

- City
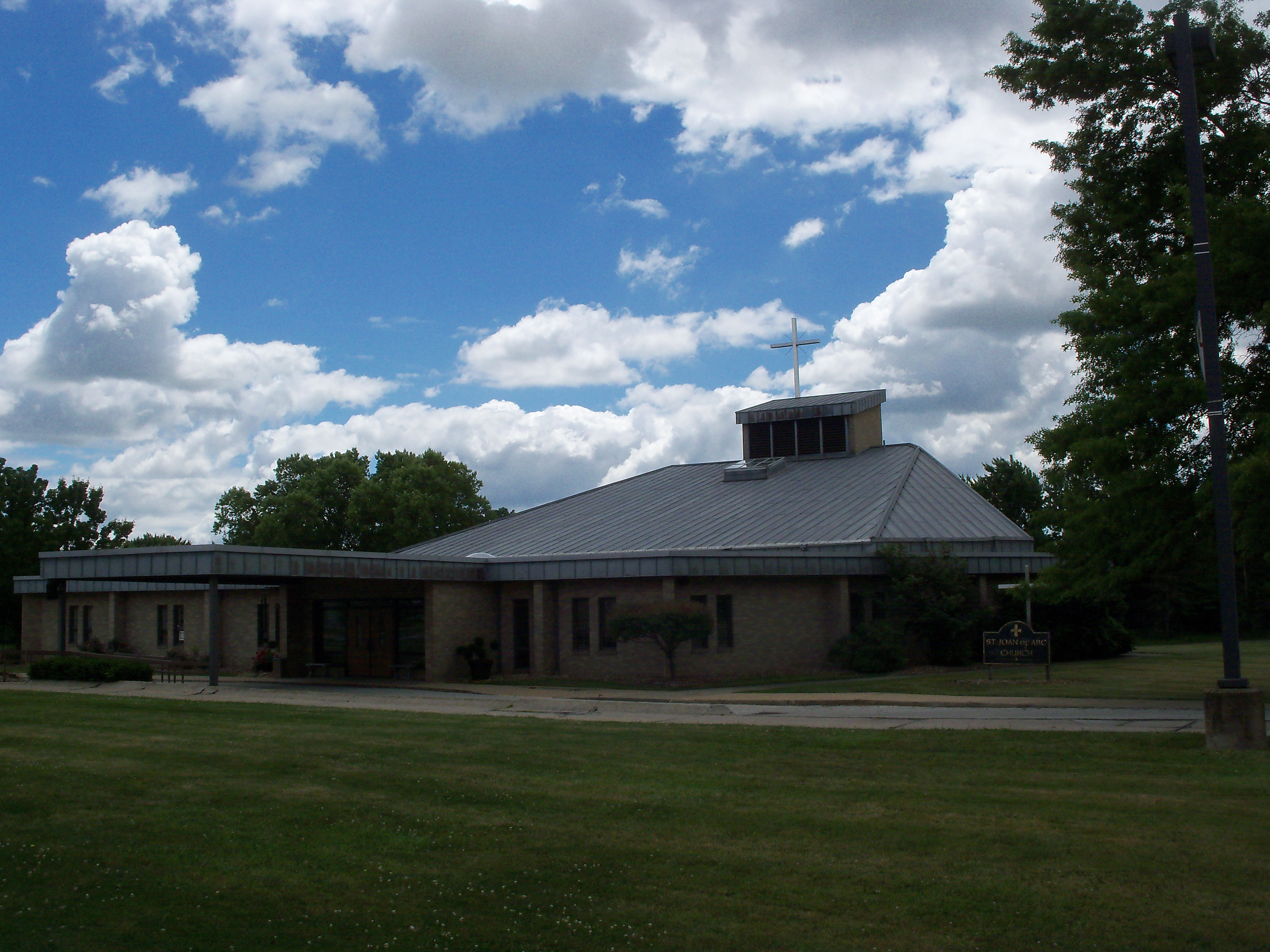
- Saint Joan of Arc Church on Route 14 was built in 1987.

- Seal
- Motto: Gateway to Progress
- Interactive map of Streetsboro, Ohio
- Location within Ohio Location within the United States
- Coordinates: 41°14′33″N 81°20′57″W
- Country: United States
- State: Ohio
- County: Portage
- Founded: 1822
- Incorporated: 1968

Area
  - Total: 24.33 sq mi (63.02 km^{2})
  - Land: 23.46 sq mi (60.75 km^{2})
  - Water: 0.88 sq mi (2.27 km^{2})
- Elevation: 1,129 ft (344 m)

Population (2020)
  - Total: 17,260
  - Density: 735.9/sq mi (284.12/km^{2})
- Time zone: UTC-5 (EST)
  - Summer (DST): UTC-4 (EDT)
- ZIP code: 44241
- Area codes: 330, 234
- FIPS code: 39-75014
- GNIS feature ID: 1086840
- Website: cityofstreetsboro.com

Streetsboro is a city in western Portage County, Ohio, United States. The population was 17,260 at the 2020 census. It is part of the Akron metropolitan area. The city was formed from most of the former Streetsboro Township of the Connecticut Western Reserve.

== History ==
Long before settlers moved into the Connecticut Western Reserve, Seneca Indians traversed the area now called Streetsboro. They used Old Portage Trail, which crosses the southwest corner of the city, to go from Lake Erie to the Ohio River basin.

The founder of Streetsboro Township was Titus Street from Connecticut, who purchased the land in 1798. Streetsboro Township was 25 square miles (65 km^{2}) and contained 15,279 acres (6,183 ha). The land was surveyed by Street's agents Ralph Cowles and Lemuel Punderson in the summer of 1822, and divided into lots of 100 acres (40 ha).

In 1825, a turnpike from Cleveland to Wellsville, Ohio, was laid by Frederick Wadsworth, Samuel Cowles, John Strauyhen, and Titus Street. Street agreed to give enough land to make it through the township. In 1827, the turnpike was completed. It followed much of the route of the present Ohio State Route 14.

Major growth began in Streetsboro with the opening of the Ohio Turnpike on October 1, 1955, and Exit 13 (now known as Exit 187) initially being the only interchange in Portage County. By 1957, with the growth of the automobile industry, Streetsboro experienced significant population growth, from just over 1,100 residents in 1950 to nearly 6,800 by 1960 and nearly 8,000 by 1970. Proximity to the Akron and Cleveland areas, along with direct access to Interstate 80 (Ohio Turnpike), Interstate 480, and State Routes 303, 43, and 14, have greatly contributed to the rapid growth of manufacturing, distribution, and commercial and residential development over the years. Streetsboro was primarily a farming community until 1970; it also was home to a small amusement park, Shady Lake Park, located on Route 14, which is now an apartment complex of the same name.

The village of Sugar Bush Knolls was incorporated from a small part of southern Streetsboro Township in 1964. Four years later, in 1968, Streetsboro voters decided to incorporate the remaining 24.33 sq mi (63.0 km^{2}) township as a village. Under Ohio law, a township that incorporates with less than 25,000 residents is classified as a village. Because it was already above 5,000 residents, the minimum population in Ohio for a village to become a city, Streetsboro officially became a city in 1971, once the 1970 US Census numbers were official.

== Geography ==
According to the United States Census Bureau, the city has a total area of 24.36 sq mi (63.09 km^{2}), of which 0.90 sq mi (2.33 km^{2}) is covered by water.

== Demographics ==
Historical population
Census	Pop.	Note	%±
1900	672		—
1910	674		0.3%
1920	715		6.1%
1930	709		−0.8%
1940	894		26.1%
1950	1,107		23.8%
1960	5,767		421.0%
1970	7,966		38.1%
1980	9,055		13.7%
1990	9,932		9.7%
2000	12,311		24.0%
2010	16,028		30.2%
2020	17,260		7.7%
2025 (est.)	17,730		2.7%

=== 2020 census ===
As of the 2020 census, Streetsboro had a population of 17,260. The median age was 40.9 years. 19.4% of residents were under the age of 18 and 16.7% of residents were 65 years of age or older. For every 100 females there were 95.1 males, and for every 100 females age 18 and over there were 93.1 males age 18 and over.

As of the 2020 census, 83.6% of residents lived in urban areas, while 16.4% lived in rural areas.

As of the 2020 census, there were 7,350 households in Streetsboro, of which 26.0% had children under the age of 18 living in them. Of all households, 45.4% were married-couple households, 19.1% were households with a male householder and no spouse or partner present, and 26.8% were households with a female householder and no spouse or partner present. About 28.6% of all households were made up of individuals and 9.8% had someone living alone who was 65 years of age or older.

As of the 2020 census, there were 7,678 housing units, of which 4.3% were vacant. The homeowner vacancy rate was 0.7% and the rental vacancy rate was 6.4%.

Racial composition as of the 2020 census
Race	Number	Percent
White	13,931	80.7%
Black or African American	1,620	9.4%
American Indian and Alaska Native	21	0.1%
Asian	550	3.2%
Native Hawaiian and Other Pacific Islander	15	0.1%
Some other race	180	1.0%
Two or more races	943	5.5%
Hispanic or Latino (of any race)	481	2.8%

=== 2010 census ===
As of the census of 2010, 16,028 people, 6,562 households, and 4,316 families were residing in the city. The population density was 683.2/sq mi (263.8/km^{2}). The 7,104 housing units averaged 302.8/sq mi (116.9/km^{2}). The racial makeup of the city was 87.7% White, 7.9% African American, 0.2% Native American, 2.2% Asian, 0.3% from other races, and 1.8% from two or more races. Hispanics or Latinos of any race were 1.7% of the population.

Of the 6,562 households, 31.4% had children under 18 living with them, 50.3% were married couples living together, 11.1% had a female householder with no husband present, 4.4% had a male householder with no wife present, and 34.2% were not families. About 26.5% of all households were made up of individuals, and 6.8% had someone living alone who was 65 or older. The average household size was 2.43, and the average family size was 2.97.

The median age in the city was 37.9 years; 22.3% of residents were under 18, 8.3% were between 18 and 24; 30.5% were 25 to 44; 27% were 45 to 64; and 11.7% were 65 or older. The gender makeup of the city was 48.5% male and 51.5% female.

=== 2000 census ===
As of the census of 2000, 12,311 people, 4,908 households, and 3,381 families were residing in the city. The population density was 512.6 people/sq mi (197.9/km^{2}). The racial makeup of the city was 95.39% White, 1.96% African American, 0.09% Native American, 1.37% Asian, 0.17% from other races, and 1.02% from two or more races. Hispanics or Latinos of any race were 0.78% of the population.

Of the 4,908 households, 31.1% had children under 18 living with them, 55.3% were married couples living together, 9.9% had a female householder with no husband present, and 31.1% were not families. About 25.1% of all households were made up of individuals, and 5.7% had someone living alone who was 65 or older. The average household size was 2.49, and the average family size was 3.00.

In the city, the age distribution was 24.3% under 18, 8.3% from 18 to 24, 35.8% from 25 to 44, 21.8% from 45 to 64, and 9.8% who were 65 or older. The median age was 34 years. For every 100 females, there were 96.7 males. For every 100 females age 18 and over, there were 93.6 males.

The median income for a household in the city was $48,661, and for a family was $55,814. Males had a median income of $36,672 versus $27,835 for females. The per capita income for the city was $21,764. About 3.9% of families and 5.3% of the population were below the poverty line, including 7.5% of those under a18 and 6.1% of those 65 or over.

== Education ==
Primary and secondary education is provided mainly by the Streetsboro City School District, which includes four schools, while a small portion of the city is part of the neighboring Kent City School District. Students in preschool through third grade attend Streetsboro Elementary School, formerly known as Campus Elementary School. Henry Defer Intermediate School serves students in grades four and five, with grades six through eight at Streetsboro Middle School. Streetsboro High School includes grades 9 through 12. All schools and the district offices, with the exception of Streetsboro High School, are located on a 116-acre (47 ha) central campus with the Streetsboro City Park. The campus also includes the Pierce Streetsboro Library, a branch of the Portage County District Library, which opened in 1988.

Voters in the district approved a $38.7 million bond issue in 2013 to fund expansion and renovations of the district's facilities. Included in the plans were the new building for Streetsboro High School along State Route 14, and an expansion and renovation of the former Campus Elementary to become Streetsboro Elementary School for preschool through grade three. Both of those projects were completed in December 2016, and the first classes held in January 2017. Additional plans included renovation of the former high school building to house Streetsboro Middle School, which enabled grade six to be moved to the middle school from Henry Defer Intermediate School, and repurposing the former middle school building. The new middle school was completed in 2018 for the start of the 2018–19 school year.

== Media ==
=== Radio ===
- WSTB 88.9 FM (Streetsboro High School – alternative rock Monday through Saturday, oldies on Sunday)

=== Print media ===
- Record-Courier, a 7-day daily newspaper, serves Portage County.

== Notable people ==
- Hester A. Benedict (1838–1921), poet and writer
- Matthew Hannan, professional wrestler
- F. A. Wing (1853–1947), politician and member of the Washington House of Representatives
- Henry H. Wyatt, Civil War–era Union soldier and Wisconsin state assemblyman
