= Buchman =

Buchman (also spelt Büchmann and Buchmann) is a surname of European and Jewish origin. The surname translates to book man in German.

== Notable people with surname ==
=== Buchman ===
- Alex Buchman (1911–2003), American activist
- Dana Buchman, American fashion designer
- Frank N. D. Buchman (1878–1961), Christian evangelist
- Heather Buchman, American conductor and trombonist
- M. L. Buchman, American author
- Sidney Buchman (1902–1975), film writer and producer

=== Buchmann ===
- Alexander Buchmann, Norwegian Handball player
- Christian Buchmann, Austrian politician
- Kéfera Buchmann, Brazilian YouTuber
- Emanuel Buchmann, German professional cyclist

=== Büchmann ===
- Georg Büchmann (1822–1884), German philologist
