= The empire on which the sun never sets =

Phrase describing a large, influential, and established empire

The phrase "the empire on which the sun never sets" (Spanish: el imperio donde nunca se pone el sol) has been employed to describe empires so territorially extensive that it seemed to be always daytime in at least one part of their domains. Deriving from similar claims of universal rule associated with the ancient Roman and Persian empires, the modern concept originated in reference to the empire of Charles V. The phrase has long been used to describe the Spanish Empire (in the 16th, 17th and 18th centuries) and the British Empire (in the 19th and early-to-mid 20th centuries).

== History ==
=== Precursors ===
German philologist Georg Büchmann identifies a speech attributed to Persian ruler Xerxes I (c. 518 BCE – 465 BCE) in ancient Greek historian Herodotus' (c. 484 BCE – 425 BCE) Histories as containing a precursor of the idea of the sun never setting on a particular political entity in the quote "We shall extend the Persian land as far as Zeus's heaven stretches. The sun will then shine on no land beyond our territory." Israeli historian Benjamin Isaac posits that this quote may have inspired ancient Greek historian Dionysius of Halicarnassus (c. 60 BCE – after 7 BCE) to describe Ancient Rome as "the first and only power ever to have made the risings and settings of the sun the boundaries of her power", and identifies this in turn as a predecessor of the "empire on which the sun never sets" phrase. According to the historian Geoffrey Parker, a claim that Charles V ruled an "empire on which the sun never set" emerged as a variant of the phrase coined in ancient Rome to describe the possessions of emperor Augustus extending 'from the rising to the setting of the sun'.

=== Spanish Empire ===
The areas of the world that at one time were territories of the Spanish Monarchy or Empire. Between 1778 and 1821, the Spanish Empire controlled territory on all six continents (except Antarctica).

Under Philip II, successor of Charles V in Spain, the concept of an "empire on which the sun never sets" became associated with the Spanish Empire. In 1585 Giovanni Battista Guarini wrote Il pastor fido to mark the marriage of Catherine Michelle, daughter of Philip II, to Charles Emmanuel I, Duke of Savoy. Guarini's dedication read, "Altera figlia / Di qel Monarca, a cui / Nè anco, quando annotta, il Sol tramonta." ("The proud daughter / of that monarch to whom / when it grows dark [elsewhere] the sun never sets.").

In the early 17th century the phrase was familiar to John Smith and to Francis Bacon, who writes: "both the East and the West Indies being met in the crown of Spain, it is come to pass, that, as one saith in a brave kind of expression, the sun never sets in the Spanish dominions, but ever shines upon one part or other of them: which, to say truly, is a beam of glory [...]". Thomas Urquhart wrote of "that great Don Philippe, Tetrarch of the world, upon whose subjects the sun never sets."

In the German dramatist Friedrich Schiller's 1787 play Don Carlos, Don Carlos's father, Philip II, says, "Ich heiße / der reichste Mann in der getauften Welt; / Die Sonne geht in meinem Staat nicht unter." ("I am called / The richest monarch in the Christian world; / The sun in my dominion never sets.").

Joseph Fouché recalled Napoleon saying before invading Spain and starting the Peninsular War, "Reflect that the sun never sets in the immense inheritance of Charles V, and that I shall have the empire of both worlds." This was cited in Walter Scott's Life of Napoleon.

=== British Empire ===
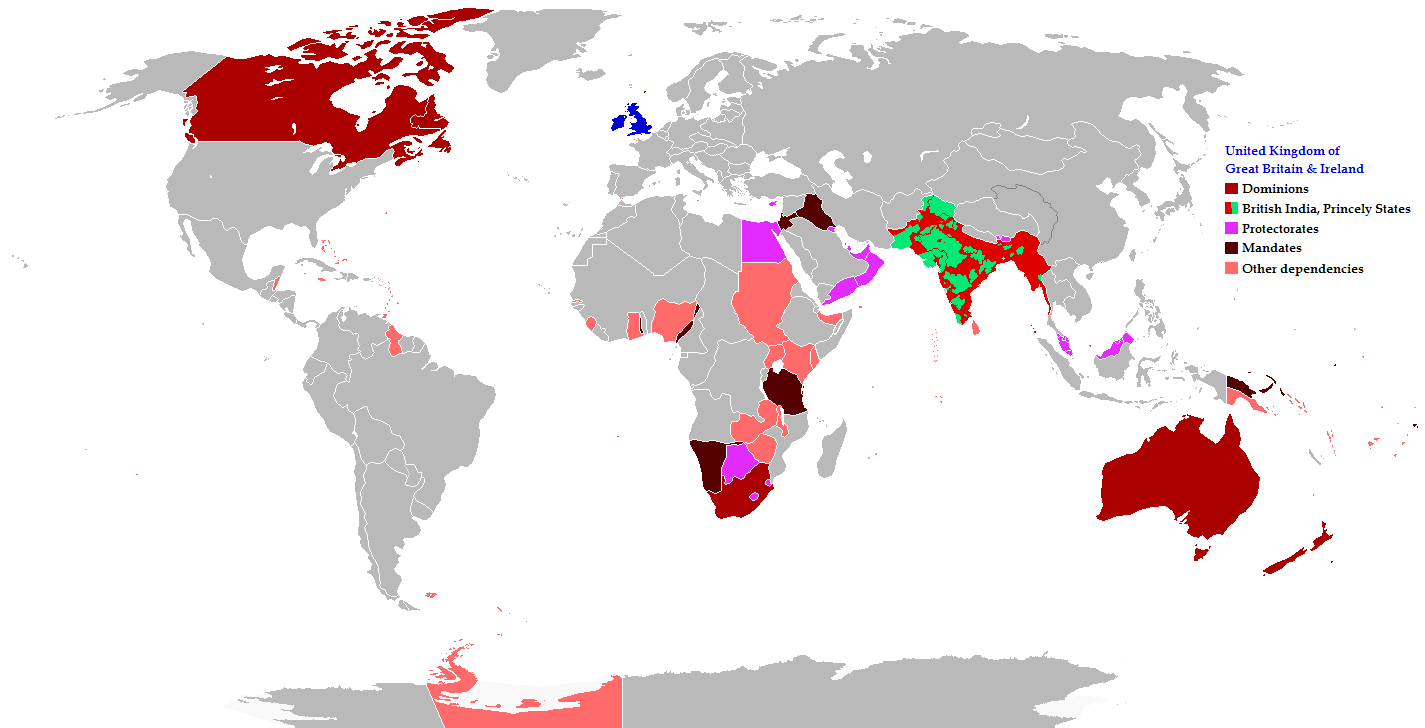
The British Empire in 1919, at its greatest extent with presence on all continents

In the 19th century it became popular to apply the phrase to the British Empire. It was a time when British world maps showed the Empire in red and pink to highlight British imperial power spanning the globe. Scottish author, John Wilson, writing as "Christopher North" in Blackwood's Magazine in 1829, is sometimes credited as originating the usage. However, George Macartney wrote in 1773, in the wake of the territorial expansion that followed Britain's victory in the Seven Years' War, of "this vast empire on which the sun never sets, and whose bounds nature has not yet ascertained."

In a speech on 31 July 1827 Rev. R.P. Buddicom said, "It had been said that the sun never set on the British flag; it was certainly an old saying, about the time of Richard the Second, and was not so applicable then as at the present time." In 1821, the Caledonian Mercury wrote of the British Empire, "On her dominions the sun never sets; before his evening rays leave the spires of Quebec, his morning beams have shone three hours on Port Jackson, and while sinking from the waters of Lake Superior, his eye opens upon the Mouth of the Ganges."

Daniel Webster famously expressed a similar idea in 1834: "A power which has dotted over the surface of the whole globe with her possessions and military posts, whose morning drumbeat, following the sun and keeping company with the hours, circles the earth with one continuous and unbroken strain of the martial airs of England." In 1839 Sir Henry Ward said in the House of Commons, "Look at the British Colonial empire—the most magnificent empire that the world ever saw. The old Spanish boast that the sun never set in their dominions, has been more truly realised amongst ourselves." By 1861, Lord Salisbury complained that the £1.5 million spent on colonial defence by Britain merely enabled the nation "to furnish an agreeable variety of stations to our soldiers, and to indulge in the sentiment that the sun never sets on our Empire".

A rejoinder, sometimes attributed to John Duncan Spaeth, runs in one variant, "The sun never set on the British Empire, because even God couldn't trust the English in the dark".

== See also ==
- List of former transcontinental countries
- Pluricontinentalism
