= Sam Shoemaker =

American priest (1893–1963)

Samuel Moor Shoemaker III
- Born: December 27, 1893; Baltimore, Maryland, U.S.
- Died: October 31, 1963 (aged 69); Baltimore County, Maryland, U.S.

Samuel Moor Shoemaker III DD, STD (December 27, 1893 – October 31, 1963) was an American priest in the Episcopal Church and a founding influence of Alcoholics Anonymous.

Samuel Shoemaker was considered one of the best preachers of his era, whose sermons were syndicated for distribution by tape and radio networks for decades. He founded Faith At Work magazine in 1926. He served as the rector of Calvary Episcopal Church in New York City from 1925 to 1952. He was the head of the United States headquarters of the Oxford Group (founded by Frank Buchman, who had a deep influence on him) and later of the Moral Re-Armament which the Oxford Group became in 1938, from circa 1927 until circa 1941. From 1952 to 1962, he served as the rector of Calvary Episcopal Church in Pittsburgh, Pennsylvania. He retired in 1962 and died the following year. Sam Shoemaker's interdenominational focus and the Oxford Group were significant influences for the founders of Alcoholics Anonymous (AA) who met through the Oxford Group. Bill Wilson attended Oxford Group meetings at Calvary Church from late 1934 to circa 1939. Sam Shoemaker helped start an Oxford Group chapter in Akron, Ohio, where Dr. Bob Smith became involved.

Serious disagreements with Oxford Group founder Frank Buchman led Shoemaker to separate from Buchman in 1941 after he had detached from the early AA for a while, before working with AA again later on.

Shoemaker's contributions and service to Alcoholics Anonymous had a worldwide effect. The program that Bill W. codified, in conjunction with Shoemaker, is used in almost every country around the world to not only treat alcoholism but also help relatives of alcoholics (Al-Anon/Alateen), and treat people suffering with other addictions such as drug addiction (Narcotics Anonymous, Cocaine Anonymous, Pills Anonymous, etc.), sex and love addiction (Sex and Love Addicts Anonymous) etc.

== Early life ==
Shoemaker was born in a rented house on Read Street in Baltimore, Maryland on December 27, 1893, to Samuel Moor Shoemaker Jr. (later chairman of the Board of Regents of the University of Maryland) and Nellie Whitridge (later president of the Women's Auxiliary of the Episcopal Diocese of Maryland), who had met at Emmanuel Church in Baltimore, where his uncle was rector.

Two years later, in 1896, the young family moved to his late paternal grandfather's property, 'Burnside', about 10 miles north of Baltimore at the entrance to the Green Spring Valley. In 1898, his father turned Burnside into a dairy farm, with a prize herd of Guernsey cattle, though his grandfather had preferred Jerseys. Sam Shoemaker was well aware of his privileged upbringing: Mennonites, some Schumachers had moved from Germany, Holland and Switzerland hundreds of years earlier, converted to Quakerism under the influence of William Penn's missionaries and Anglicised their surname as they moved to Germantown, which became a Philadelphia neighborhood. One of his ancestors of the same name had twice served as Philadelphia's mayor, and his paternal grandfather (who died in 1884 and for whom both Sam's father and young Sam were named), although born in Lafourche Parish, Louisiana, made his fortune organizing the Great Western Express transportation line between Philadelphia and Baltimore. His paternal grandmother, the Victorian matriarch who raised him as an Episcopalian, was Augusta Chambers Eccleston, of Chestertown, Maryland, daughter of Maryland Court of Appeals Judge John Bowers Eccleston (1794–1860) and sister of the Rev. John H. E. Eccleston, whose Emmanuel Episcopal Church was decorated with flowers from the family's greenhouses. A more distant John C. Eccleston (1828–1912) served as a priest in Richmond County, New York. Sam's maternal grandfather, John Augustus Whitridge, had a fleet of clipper ships, although he died when Sam was 13. Shoemaker later became known for a slight southern inflection in his speech, which he attributed not to these relatives, but to his lifelong friend Hen Bodley, and to James (actually Richard Hugh Gwathney), a longtime family servant, who had been born in Fredericksburg, Virginia.

In 1908, when Sam was 14, he was sent to St. George's School, Rhode Island, an Episcopal boarding school founded and run by the Rev. John Byron Diman, who later converted to Roman Catholicism and founded the Portsmouth Priory near the school. Sam, homesick, initially did not feel comfortable among the "Yankees." He also did not consider himself a good student, but did hold several positions during his years at the school, including as president of the missionary society.

Upon graduating in 1912, Shoemaker attended Princeton University as had his father. A fan of President Woodrow Wilson, Shoemaker became acquainted with the political controversies of the day, and after his sophomore year, circa 1914, traveled to Europe. Upon returning, Shoemaker and three other students protested war propaganda and military drills at the university. At Princeton, Shoemaker had met Robert Speer, John Mott and Sherwood Eddy through the World Student Christian Federation. He became interested in personal evangelism and missionary work, as well as the relatively new ecumenical movement. He graduated from Princeton in 1916.

From 1917 until 1919, with the blessing of the Rt. Reverend John Gardner Murray, bishop of Maryland, Sam Shoemaker went to China to start a branch of the YMCA and teach business courses at the Princeton-in-China Program. Shoemaker spent several years in China. In January 1918 he met there Frank Buchman, founder of the First Century Christian Fellowship, later known as the Oxford Group. A follower of John Mott as well, and a leader of Penn State's YMCA group, Buchman advised Shoemaker to look inside himself, and to talk about his personal experiences. Buchman also told Shoemaker about the essence of the Sermon on the Mount being four absolutes: honesty, purity, unselfishness and love. After contemplating his own inadequacy compared to those absolutes, Shoemaker decided to let God guide his life. He returned to Princeton in 1919 to head the Philadelphian Society, a campus Christian organization which he had led during his senior year.

== Calvary Church in New York ==
On June 20, 1920, bishop Murray ordained Shoemaker a deacon in the Episcopal Church. On June 12, 1921, he was ordained a priest. Shoemaker then returned to his earlier post at Princeton through the school year, 1922–23. There, he maintained his ties with the First Century Christian Fellowship; Buchman also made frequent visits to Princeton. However, by the time Shoemaker returned to Princeton, the movement's personal evangelism had begun to gather both friends and foes in England (where Buchman had started his First Century Christian Fellowship at Oxford and Cambridge) as well as America.

After completing his missionary year at Princeton, Shoemaker entered General Theological Seminary in New York. During his second year, Dr. Charles Lewis Slattery, rector of Grace Church, at Broadway and Tenth Street, appointed him as a part-time assistant. After graduation and ordination, with his bishop's approval, Shoemaker and two British university graduates traveled with Buchman through Europe and the Middle East, exploring the meaning of Christian discipleship in missions and hospitals as they had in Beijing. Between Egypt and India, in 1924, Shoemaker received a cable and letter from the vestry at Calvary Church (Manhattan), a then-dwindling but storied missionary congregation in a once-fashionable but changing neighborhood that wanted the energetic youth to become their rector.

Bishop William T. Manning of New York approved of the First Century Christian Fellowship and Shoemaker's taking the helm at Calvary Church in the Gramercy Park neighborhood. At Calvary, where he became rector after a successful two-year trial term, Shoemaker constantly balanced both the institutional and sacramental aspects of the church's life, as well as his personal faith as influenced by Buchman and the First Century Christian Fellowship. He held outdoor services in nearby Madison Square beginning in the summer of 1927, attracting new parishioners through music as well as his sermons, and began transforming the church school that winter term.

For the next eleven years, Sam and his wife Helen managed to combine the diverse interests of Calvary Church with the life style and program of the First Century Christian Fellowship soon to be known as the Oxford Group. The church's ministry grew rapidly, by about 100 parishioners at the Sunday morning service in his first year, and another 100 during the second. However, not all of Calvary's members congregation were committed to the radical life style and "hot gospelling" of the Oxford Group. Selling some church lots on 22nd Street to build a new eight-story Calvary House in place of the old rectory also caused controversy.

At a different location, the church also owned and operated the Calvary Mission, or Calvary Rescue Mission, an outreach project to serve the disadvantaged. The facility could house up to 57 homeless men, and served over 200,000 meals in its 10 years of operation.

In 1926, Shoemaker founded the Faith at Work movement (later called Lumunos in 2000). On Thursday evenings through approximately 1936, lay persons both presented their witness of their life as Christians in the workaday world and were trained to witness to that world (see section below).

In 1927, after his two years trial as a rector, Shoemaker gradually set the United States headquarters of Frank Buchman's First Century Christian Fellowship soon to be named Oxford Group at Calvary House adjacent to the church.

However, when the Great Depression hit in 1929 and continued, controversy had grown around Shoemaker. In 1932, the Calvary vestry granted him an extended leave of absence to bring his ideas to a wider audience.

"We must all realize that the work which has been characteristic of Calvary Parish for the past few years is part of a much larger movement which is making a tremendous spiritual contribution in many countries today: A First Century Christian Fellowship or the Oxford Group has been called by Archbishop William Temple of York "one of the main movements of the Spirit in our time". "The evident need of our country in the world of spiritual awakening lays a special obligation upon us all at Calvary to share with others what has helped us. "When therefore the Rector asked us to come to a special meeting of the vestry on June 15, and proposed to us that he be released for a six month sabbatical leave during which time he would devote himself entirely to the furtherance of this important work, (with the International Team of the Oxford Group) throughout America, we felt that this was a call which neither he nor we should disregard. Further we wanted him to go as our representative."

Around 1938, Buchman transformed The Oxford Groups into Moral Re-Armament. Controversy grew because the latter dissociated from Christian churches and New Testament orientation. Moral Re-Armament also took an increasing share of Shoemaker's time and the facilities of Calvary House in New York. Shoemaker re-evaluated his priorities, including with Frank Buchman and the Oxford Group, as well as his commitment to evangelism, devotion to the Church of Christ in general and to the Episcopal Church. Efforts to work through these concerns in 1940 and 1941 proved fruitless. Shoemaker detached from Buchman and in the closing months of 1941, Calvarly Church's vestry formally asked Moral Re Armament to stop using Calvary House.

Shoemaker soon reactivated the Faith at Work program and meetings resumed at New-York's Calvary Church.

He became involved in radio preaching, and in 1946, Dr. Frank Goodman of the Federal Council of Churches offered Shoemaker a daily five-minute spot on station WJZ. That proved successful, leading to a Sunday half hour broadcast on station WOR, and another half-hour program called "Faith in our Time".

He was an awarded Doctor of Divinity from Virginia Theological Seminary and Berkeley Divinity School, ca 1948.

He founded the Calvary Clergy School, ca. 1948.(?)

== Calvary Church in Pittsburgh ==
Shoemaker had evangelized among young people and in the surrounding area of Pittsburgh, including setting up an Oxford Group meeting in Akron, Ohio circa 1930.

Shoemaker's fame led him to receive a call to become Dean of San Francisco Cathedral in 1950, which he declined.

The following year, 1951, after celebrating his own quarter century of ministry at Calvary Church in New York, Calvary Church in Pittsburgh, Pennsylvania called Shoemaker to serve as its rector. The Bishop of Pittsburgh called to urge him to accept, as did a group of Pittsburgers who called themselves the Golf Club crowd. He ultimately did.

In 1955, he launched what he called the Interdenominational Pittsburgh Experiment seeking to bring Christianity into everyday life, and about which he wrote The Experiment of Faith(1957). The Pittsburgh Jaycees named him their Man of the Year in 1956, and the previous year Newsweek named him among the country's ten best preachers.

While based in Pittsburgh, Shoemaker continued to tape his sermons as the "Episcopal Hour" (and during 1957-1958 the "Art of Living") for distribution by the National Council of the Churches of Christ.

Shoemaker also had a half hour radio show called Faith that Works.

== Family life ==
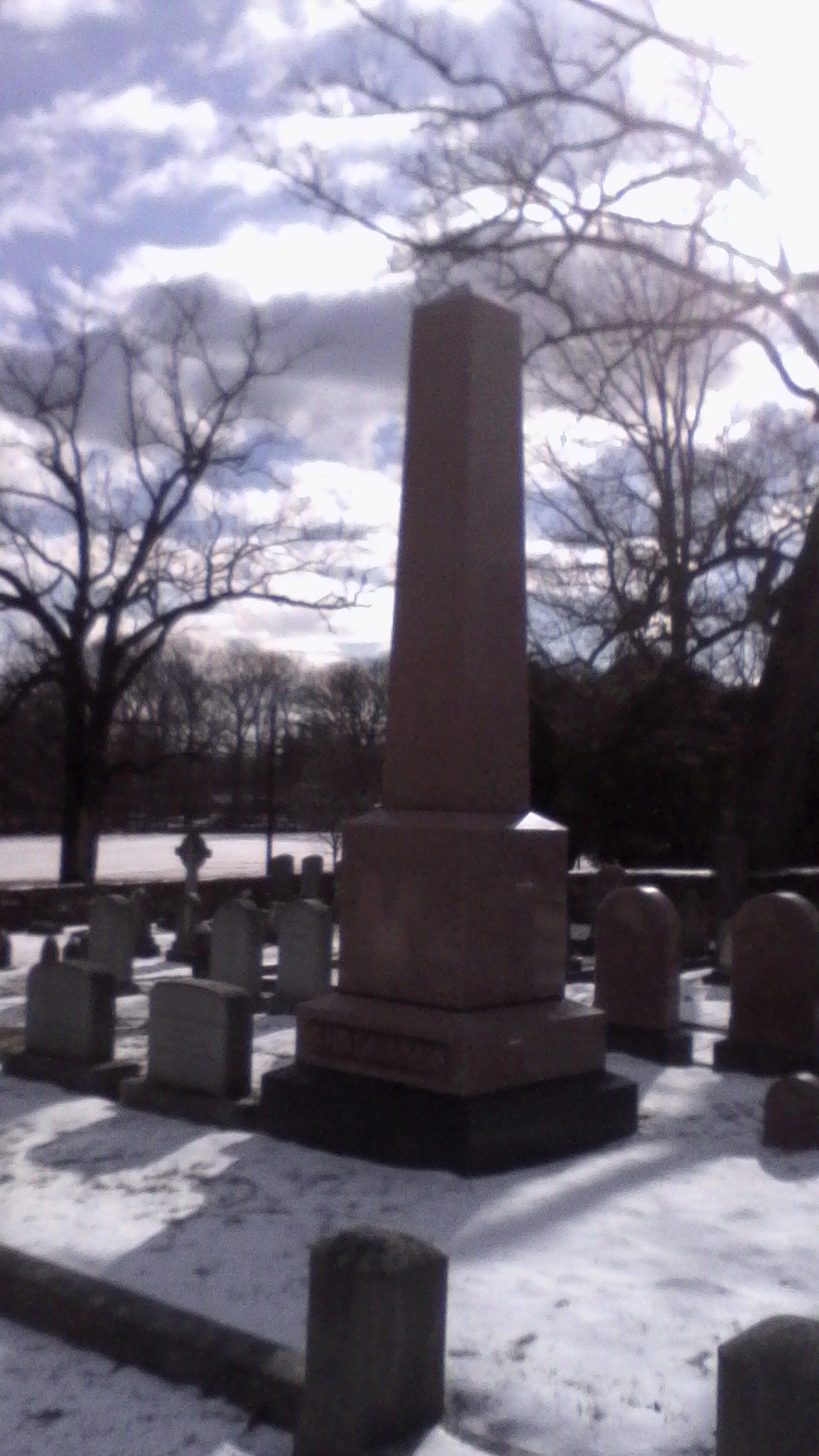
Helen and Sam Shoemakers' white gravestones in rear of Shoemaker family plot in St. Thomas' churchyard

His wife, Helen Smith Shoemaker, whom he met at Princeton and married in 1925, was an author and sculptor as well as fellow church leader. They had two daughters, one of whom married a missionary who served in Asia, and the other of whom also traveled extensively abroad as the wife of a State Department official.

== Death and legacy ==
Declining health caused Shoemaker to retire from Pittsburgh Calvary Church and return home to Burnside; however, he continued to broadcast Sunday sermons on the "Faith That Works" radio program from WBAL in Baltimore. He died after a prolonged illness on the eve of All Saints Day 1963, and was buried after a service at St. Thomas Church in Owings Mills, Baltimore County. He was interred in the family plot in the St. Thomas churchyard, as was his wife who died in 1993.

On November 7, 1963, an additional memorial service was held in his honor at Calvary Church in Pittsburgh, and later another at Calvary Church in Manhattan, with Dr. Norman Vincent Peale's contributing material for the commemorative edition of Faith at Work magazine.

== Alcoholics Anonymous ==
As a rector of Calvary Church, Shoemaker ran Calvary Church Rescue Mission, a place for “the down-and-out,” which Bill Wilson co-founder of Alcoholics Anonymous with Dr. Bob Smith from Akron, Ohio, had visited in 1934, near the end of his drinking. It was where Bill Wilson came to know Sam Shoemaker who would become a lifelong friend.

Bill Wilson was in his last relapse when he attended his first Oxford Group meeting for drunks, in Calvary Church Rescue Mission. That was after a visit by a friend, Ebby Thacher, who had just found sobriety in the Oxford Group. In keeping with the Oxford Group Teachings, Ebby Thacher needed to keep his own conversion experience real by carrying the Oxford Group message of salvation to others.

A couple of days later, Bill Wilson re-admitted himself to Charles B. Towns Hospital to sober up again. Wilson had been admitted to Towns hospital three times earlier between 1933 and 1934. This would be his fourth and last stay. This is when he had his “spiritual experience”, in December 1934. After Wilson left the hospital, he never drank again.

After his release from the Towns hospital, Wilson attended Oxford Group meetings for drunks at Calvary Rescue Mission and went on a mission to save other alcoholics. His prospects came through Towns Hospital and the Calvary Rescue Mission. Though he was not able to keep one alcoholic sober, he found that by engaging in the activity of trying to convert others he was able to keep himself sober. It was this realization, that he needed other alcoholics to work with, that brought him into contact with Bob Smith while on a business trip in Akron, Ohio. Earlier Bill Wilson had been advised by Dr Silkworth to change his approach and tell the alcoholics they suffered from an illness, one that could kill them, and afterward apply the Oxford Practices. The idea that alcoholism was an illness, not a moral failing, was different from the Oxford concept that drinking was a sin. This is what he brought to Bob Smith on their first meeting. Smith was the first alcoholic Wilson helped to sobriety.

In 1937, whether Bill Wilson and “his drunks” quit Calvary Church Rescue Mission to meet somewhere else, or were thrown out remains uncertain, but Shoemaker was upset and did not speak to Wilson again until after he detached from Buchman's Oxford group, in 1942. “He later wrote a letter of apology to Bill stating that he and other Oxford Group members were wrong to oppose Bill’s desire to work solely with alcoholics and to focus only on helping these individuals to stop drinking.” Dr. Shoemaker had helped early A.A. in fundamental ways. Physically, he provided refuge for alcoholics in New York though Calvary Mission Rescue Mission. Of greater importance was his spiritual aid, which directly influenced the Twelve Steps and the nature of A.A.’s program of recovery.

Bill Wilson credited Sam Shoemaker as a key source of the ideas underpinning Alcoholics Anonymous:

It was from Sam Shoemaker that we absorbed most of the Twelve Steps of Alcoholics Anonymous, steps that express the heart of AA's way of life. Dr. Silkworth gave us the needed knowledge of our illness, but Sam Shoemaker had given us the concrete knowledge of what we could do about it. He passed on the spiritual keys by which we were liberated. The early AA got its ideas of self-examination, acknowledgment of character defects, restitution for harm done, and working with others straight from the Oxford Group and directly from Sam Shoemaker, their former leader in America, and from nowhere else.

Although Bill Wilson later said in an address about Shoemaker at the St Louis AA convention in 1955 alongside Father Ed.

It is through Sam, that most of our principles have come. That is he has been the connecting link for them. It is what Ebby learned from Sam and what Ebby told me that makes up the linkage between Sam, the man of religion, and ourselves. How well I remember that first day I caught sight of Sam. It was a Sunday service in his church. I was still rather gun-shy and diffident about churches. I can still see him standing there before the lectern. And Sam's utter honesty, his tremendous forthrightness, his almost terrible sincerity struck me deep. I shall never forget it.

Shoemaker also addressed an AA group in Charlotte, North Carolina, June 17, 1962, saying:

To set the record straight, that there has gotten going in AA, a kind of rumor, that I had a lot to do with the 12 steps. I didn't have anymore to do with those 12 steps other than that book had. Those twelve steps, I believe came to Bill by himself. I think he told me they came to him in about 40 minutes and I think it's one of the great instances of direct inspiration that I know in human history. Inspiration which doesn't only bring material straight down out of heaven, but brings rather, I think, from God the ability to interpret human experience in such a way that you distill it down into transmissible principles, I compare it to Moses going up on the mountain and bringing down the Ten tables of the Law. I don't think that's the first time Moses ever thought about righteousness. But I'm glad he went up there and got those ten and brought them down and gave them to us. And I'm glad Bill got quiet for those 40 minutes, until he finished off these 12 steps. And I believe they have only been changed by about one word. Bill said at the end of this talk: Who invented AA?, It was God almighty that invented AA, but this is the story of how we learned to be Free." And he closed by saying "God grant that AA and the program of recovery, and unity, and service be a story that continues into the future as long as God needs it." Praise be to God for it, and for the life of that fellow and all those who were with him in the beginnings of this incredible movement.

== Faith at Work ==
The Manhattan Calvary Church Thursday evening sessions started in 1926 already alluded to, which were devoted to lay witnesses, provided models for subsequent Faith at Work programs.

In it can be traced the lineaments of the witnesses still a part of the Faith at Work Conference Ministry and of the spate of personal witness articles that appeared in the Calvary Evangel magazine and have continued in the pages of Faith at Work magazine. The Lay Witness Missions, now conducted under other auspices than Faith at Work, also had their beginnings in the Thursday evening meetings.

The Thursday night witness sessions were paralleled by an activity which began in the Calvary House boiler room when the janitor Herbie Lantau witnessed to a painter named Bill Levine. They later were joined by Ralston Young, Red Cap #42, from Grand Central Station. Ralston did his witnessing to the people whose baggage he handled and later to groups that gathered for prayer in a car placed in a siding, on Track 13, at Grand Central.

This small group joined some others who were disenfranchised when the split came with the Moral Re-Armament (MRA) in 1942. They and many others met with Irving Harris whose work at the Calvary Evangel and later with its successors covered a period of over three decades. Harris gave structure to the Thursday evening services and was later the enabler of the Monday groups. These were to continue in one form or another until Faith at Work moved to Columbia, Maryland in 1971.

According to Helen Shoemaker, Sam believed that "small group action...always started with personal counseling" and then continued in the group. This is probably a carry-over from Sam's work in the Oxford Group where conversion or change was the starting point and the group sharing followed. Sam's often repeated triad "Get changed, get together, and get going" also reflects this order. We shall have occasion to return to the topic in a subsequent section.

An activity related to the Thursday night witness services was the work of Alcoholics Anonymous. AA began under Sam's inspiration and meetings were held every Tuesday night in the Great Hall of Calvary House. The starting points of Faith at Work and AA were similar, but the latter addressed itself to a more particular audience.

The first week-end Conference of Faith at Work, the progenitor of hundreds of such conferences to be conducted all over the country in subsequent years was held at Calvary House in 1943. The means and methods adopted for the conference included:

- 1) Conversion of Individuals to Christ
- 2) Listening to God
- 3) Loyalty to the Church and the Bible
- 4) Fellowship, Prayer, and Training Groups
- 5) Faith at Work Literature
- 6) Impact on Situations
- 7) Cooperation between Christian Groups and People.

Of these methods, the first, second, and fourth have strong affinities with the procedures of the Oxford Group.

A Meeting in Print

Faith at Work probably never would have come into existence as an independent movement if it had not been for the growing influence of The Calvary Evangel magazine, later called The Evangel, a magazine of Faith at Work, and still later simply Faith at Work.

The Calvary Evangel magazine started as the monthly church publication of Calvary Church providing both parish information and fairly traditional inspiration from the time of its inception in 1888 until it was taken over by Sam Shoemaker and his friends in 1925. In 1930, Irving Harris became the editor of the newly renamed The Evangel on a part-time basis and from that time until Sam Shoemaker's departure for Pittsburgh at the end of 1951, it reflected faithfully the life style and point of view of its leadership.

In 1942, the editor spoke of The Evangel as "a magazine for life changing and spiritual continuance and a regular means of keeping in touch with one another." A superficial analysis of the contents of The Evangel in the period 1925-1951 suggests that in addition to serving as a newsletter, the magazine provided two kinds of input:

- Stories or witnesses of particular personal experiences of Christ and His power to change lives
- Practical but more general and professional input on how to live the Christian life in a more formal and practical way

Sam Shoemaker's description of Faith at Work magazine is apt for this period of the organization's life:

Faith at Work is not a popular "how to get ahead" manual. It is not concerned with offering faith as the key to wealth, popularity, and success. It makes no attempt to prove that through faith life can be made easy; rather it tries to make clear that through faith at work life can be made great. Faith at Work is a meeting in print."

== Books ==
Shoemaker wrote over 30 books, about half of which were circulating before A.A.’s 12 Steps were first published in the A.A. Big Book in 1939. Shoemaker's books were circulated in New York, Akron, and the Oxford Group.

- Realizing Religion, 1921
- A Young Man’s View of the Ministry, 1923
- One Boy’s Influence, 1925
- Children of the Second Birth, 1927
- Religion That Works, 1928
- Twice-Born Ministers, 1929
- If I Be Lifted Up, 1931
- The Conversion of the Church, 1932
- Confident Faith, 1932
- Christ’s Words from the Cross, 1933
- The Gospel According to You, 1934
- Calvary Church Yesterday and Today, 1936
- National Awakening, 1936
- The Church Can Save the World, 1938
- God’s Control, 1939
- Christ and This Crisis, 1943
- How You Can Help Other People, 1946
- How You Can Find Happiness, 1947
- Living Your Life Today, 1947
- Revive Thy Church, 1948
- Freedom and Faith, 1949
- The Church Alive, 1950
- They’re on the Way, 1951
- How to Become a Christian, 1953
- By the Power of God, 1954
- The Experiment of Faith, 1957
- With the Holy Spirit and with Fire, 1960
- Beginning Your Ministry, 1963
- Sam Shoemaker at His Best, 1964
- Extraordinary Living for Ordinary Men, 1965
- Under New Management, 1966
- Steps of a Modern Disciple, 1972

== See also ==
- Alcoholics Anonymous
- Frank Buchman
- Oxford Group
