= Helen Smith Shoemaker =

American sculptor

Helen Smith Shoemaker (March 16, 1903 – January 29, 1993) was an American author, sculptor and Episcopalian church leader, and co-founder of the Anglican Fellowship of Prayer.

== Biography ==
She was born in New York City on March 16, 1903 to Howard Alexander Smith, a U.S. senator from New Jersey from 1944 to 1958, and Helen Babcock Dominick.

Helen Smith was educated privately and then studied art in New York City. She attended schools in Colorado, Princeton, New Jersey, and Florence, Italy. She also studied art in Paris and New York. In the 1920s in New York, she was attracted to the First Century Christian Fellowship founded by Frank Buchman, that would later become the Oxford Group in 1928, and the Moral Re-Armament movement (MRA) in 1938.

She worked and resided with a First Century Christian Fellowship group at Calvary Episcopal Church in New York, and there met the Rev. Dr. Samuel Shoemaker, (Samuel Moor Shoemaker), who was rector. After their marriage, she sought to help her clergyman husband by a ministry of hospitality and entertaining. She was a founder of the Anglican Fellowship of Prayer, an international prayer movement, consisting of small groups of people meeting in church basements and homes to pray for soldiers during World War II.

It expanded in 1958 into a nationwide organization whose mission is to intercede continually for the national church and beyond, following the Anglican Cycle of Prayer. After the death of her husband, she wrote a memoir of him, I Stand By the Door: The Life of Sam Shoemaker (1967). She published a number of books on prayer, including Prayer and You (1948), and The Secret Effect of Prayer (1967).

The family moved to Calvary Episcopal Church in Pittsburgh in 1952 and retired to a home in the Greenspring Valley of Baltimore County in 1962. Mr. Shoemaker died in 1963.

Mrs. Shoemaker, along with Polly Wiley of Pound, New York, began organizing the Anglican Fellowship of Prayer in the 1940s. The organization is now based in Orlando, Florida. She represented the Episcopal Church at the First Evangelical Congress in Switzerland at the invitation of evangelist Billy Graham. A lifelong champion of the lay ministry and the role of women in the church, Mrs. Shoemaker also supported civil rights.

She died in Brooklandville, Maryland on January 29, 1993 at age 89.

== Sculptures ==
In her early 70s, Mrs. Shoemaker began sculpting again. She created a series of bronze statues of Archangels, a head of Christ and several other works now owned by churches and other religious organizations.

Shoemaker created a set of four Archangels consisting of Archangel Michael, Archangel Gabriel, Archangel Uriel and Archangel Raphael.

The bronze Archangels were manufactured under private contract and were delivered with a 40-page booklet on The Archangels.

Every Archangel made by Shoemaker was done by her employing the process of Lost-wax casting, each statue therefore had unique and slight differences.

No complete set of the four bronze Archangels is known to exist.

== Publications ==
- Prayer and You (1948)
- Prayer Through Prayer Groups (1958)
- I Stand by the Door (1967)
- Prayer is Action (1969)
- The Secret of Effective Prayer (1969)
- Prayer and Evangelism (1974)
- The Exploding Mystery of Prayer (1978)
- The Magnificent Promise (1985)
