= Calvary-St. George's Parish =

Church in Manhattan, New York

Coordinates: 40.73888°N 73.98669°W

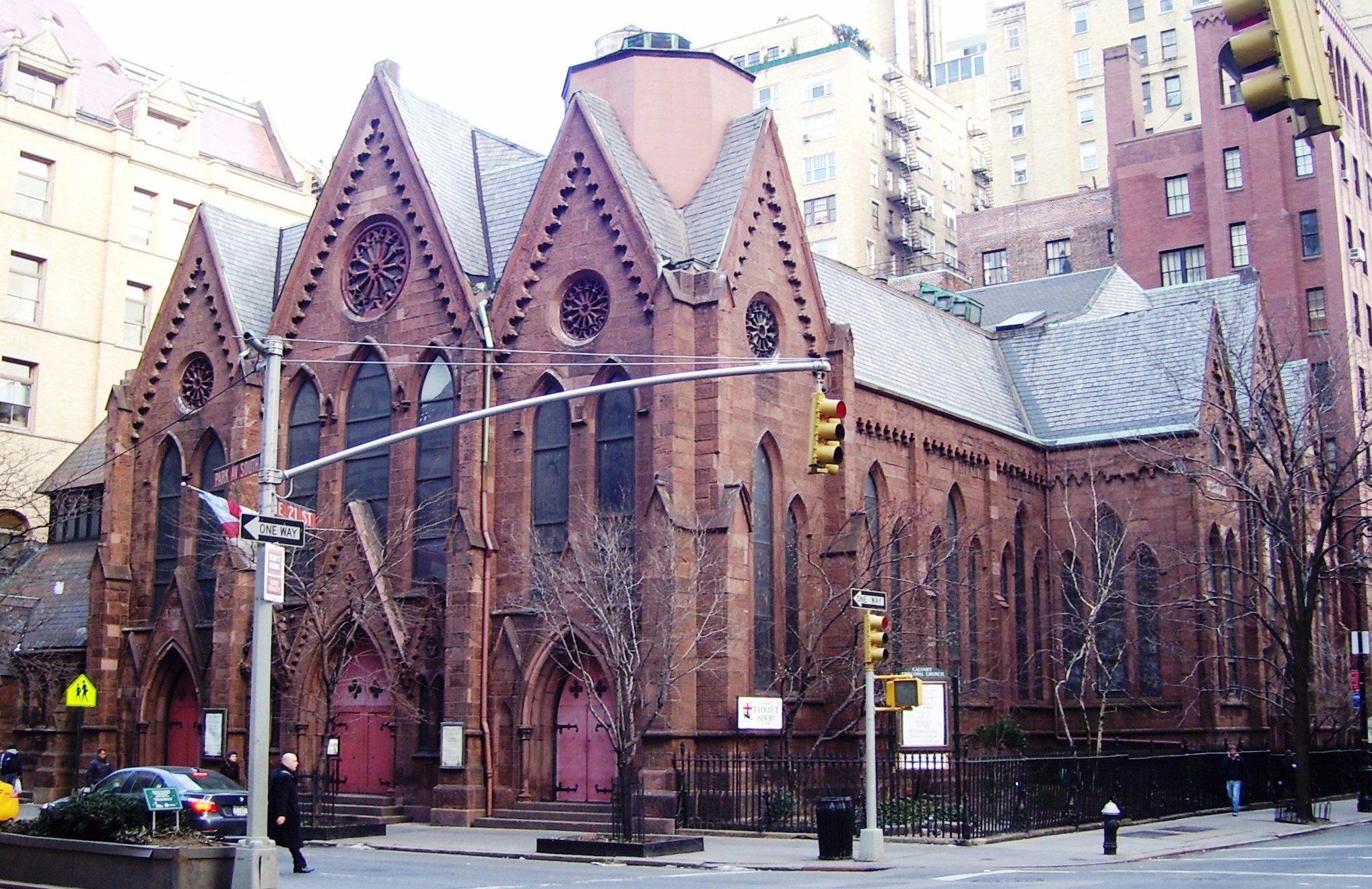

Calvary-St. George's Parish is an Episcopal parish in Manhattan, New York City. The current Rector is Jacob Smith, who came to the parish and was ordained as a presbyter in the fall of 2006 and installed as Rector in 2017. The other priests are Molly Jane Layton, Janet Broderick, and Nancy Hanna. Kamel Boutros, a former singer with Metropolitan Opera, is music director. In 2021, it reported 625 members, average attendance of 139, and $749,025 in plate and pledge income.

Calvary-St George's was the birthplace of Alcoholics Anonymous. It also served as the launch point for Let My People Go, a non-profit organization that teaches churches how to fight human trafficking, and sponsors Out Not Down, an LGBT youth homelessness prevention program. A soup kitchen ministry serves meals to approximately 125 people on Thursdays at noon. The parish also hosts a children's Christmas pageant open to "[w]hoever shows up at church," according to Wall Street Journal.

After a May 1, 2016 fire burned neighboring church Serbian Orthodox Cathedral of St. Sava, members of that parish temporarily used the St George's sanctuary to gather. St George's also hosts St. Ann's Church for the Deaf, the first church for the Deaf in the United States, and Sea Dog Theater, a non-profit off-Broadway theater troupe.

During the early days of New York's 2020 coronavirus lockdown, New York Post reported on the church's bells, which played "Amazing Grace" and other hymns four times a day. Calvary-St George's connection to Harry Thacker Burleigh, one of the first African-American composers to incorporate spirituality into music, was subject of a February 2021 PIX11 Black history moment.

== History ==
The parish was formed in 1976 by the merger of the parishes of three churches which were in close proximity:

- St. George's Church, founded in 1749 and located at 209 East 16th Street at Rutherford Place, on Stuyvesant Square;
- Calvary Church, founded in 1832 and located at 273 Park Avenue South on the corner of East 21st Street in the Gramercy Park neighborhood near the Flatiron District; and
- Church of the Holy Communion, founded in 1844 and located at 656–662 Avenue of the Americas (Sixth Avenue) at West 20th Street in the Flatiron District.

With all three parishes facing dwindling enrollment and financial problems, the combined parish deconsecrated the Church of the Holy Communion and sold the church buildings to Odyssey House, a drug rehabilitation program, in order to raise money and pay down their debts. Odyssey House, in turn, sold them to nightclub entrepreneur Peter Gatien, who opened the New York Limelight club there in 1983. The buildings are currently the location of an upscale boutique mall called the Limelight Marketplace. The other two sanctuaries of the combined parish both remain in use.
