= Church of the Holy Communion and Buildings =

Church in Manhattan, New York

- U.S. National Register of Historic Places
- New York City Landmark
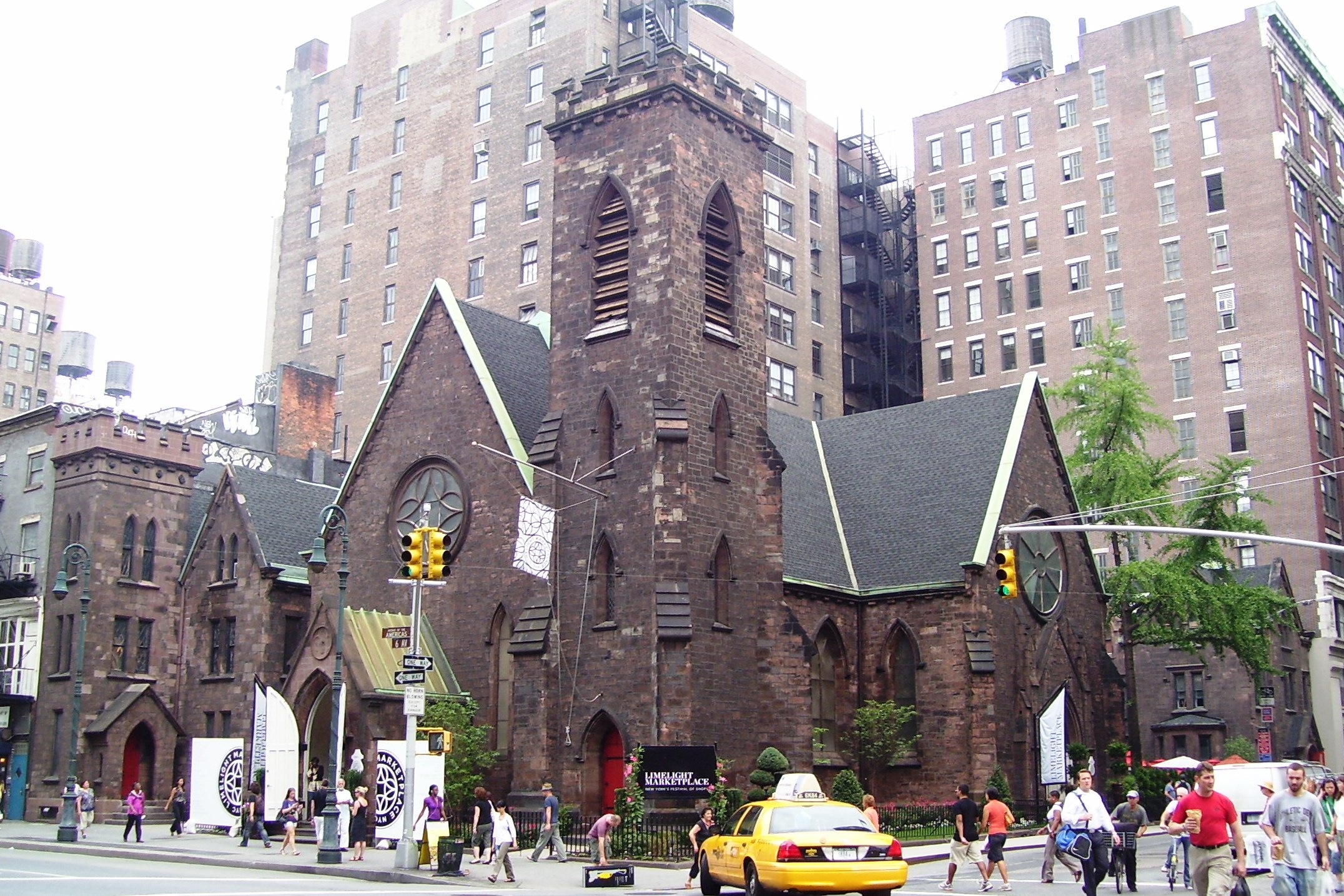
- The buildings in 2010, as the Limelight Marketplace

- Location within New York City Location within New York Location within the United States
- Location: 656–662 Avenue of the Americas (6th Avenue); Manhattan, New York City
- Coordinates: 40°44′27.8″N 73°59′38″W
- Built: 1844
- Architect: Richard Upjohn
- Architectural style: Gothic Revival
- NRHP reference No.: 80002680

Significant dates
- Added to NRHP: April 17, 1980
- Designated NYCL: April 17, 1966

The Church of the Holy Communion and Buildings are historic former Episcopal church buildings at 656–662 Avenue of the Americas (Sixth Avenue) at West 20th Street in the Flatiron District of Manhattan, New York City. A pioneering work of American Gothic Revival, the church served as an Episcopal parish from its construction in 1845 to its closure in 1975. The buildings have since been used for a number of different purposes, most famously as the New York City location of The Limelight nightclub from 1983 to 2003. It currently houses a gym.

The church is a New York City landmark, designated in 1966, and was added to the National Register of Historic Places in 1980. It is located within New York City's Ladies' Mile Historic District.

== History ==
The Gothic Revival church building was constructed in 1844–1845 according to a design by Richard Upjohn, and was consecrated in 1846. In 1853 Upjohn completed the Parish House and Rectory on West 20th Street, and in 1854 he built the Sister's House, which would house the Sisterhood of the Holy Communion. The design of the church, which features brownstone blocks chosen for placement at random, made the church "one of the most influential buildings of the 19th century". It was:

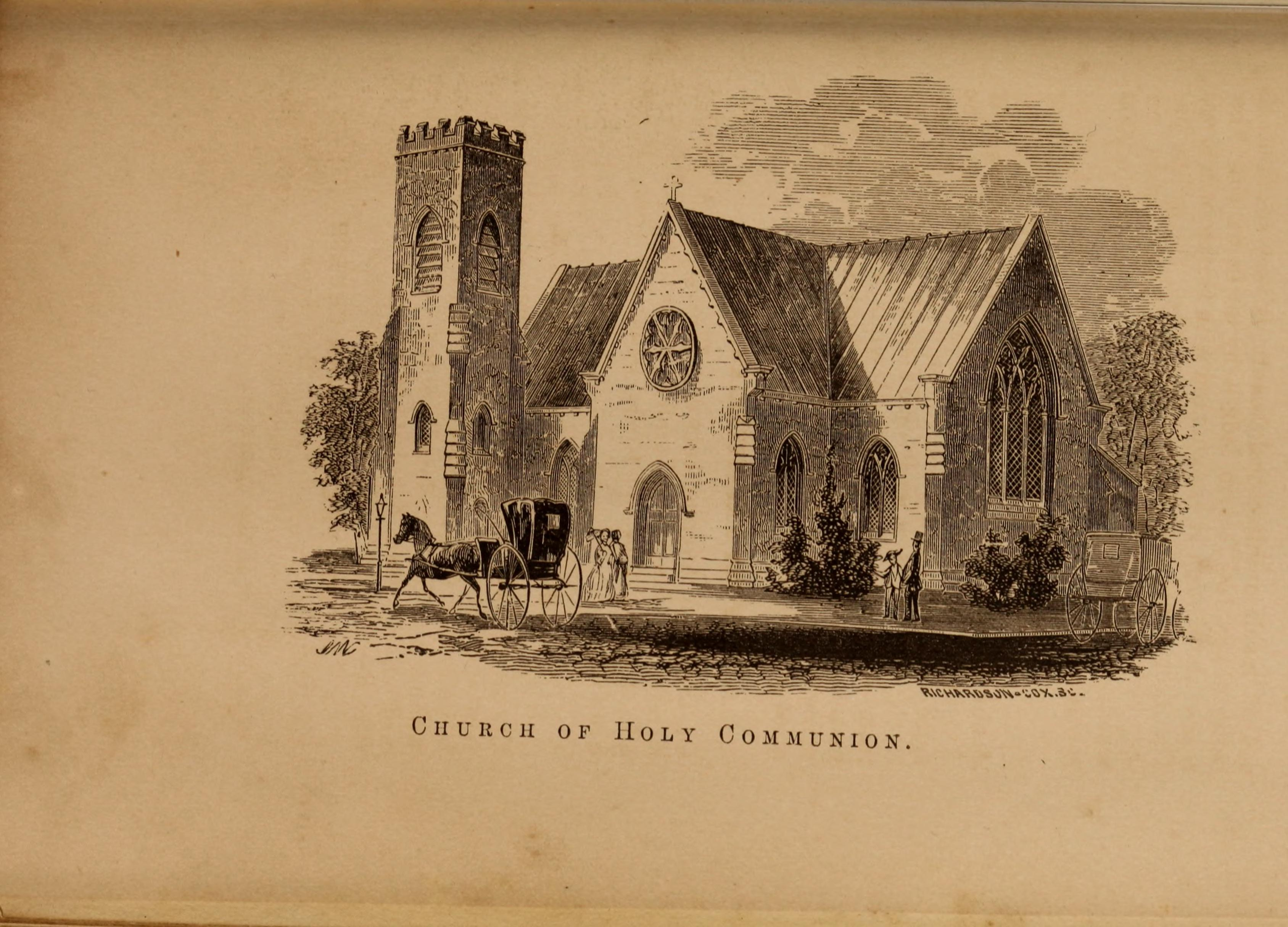
1876

[the] first asymmetrical Gothic Revival church edifice in the United States ... Upjohn designed the building to resemble a small medieval English parish church ... The church's founder, the Reverend William Muhlenberg, a leader of the evangelical Catholic within the Episcopal Church, was closely involved with the design ...

Muhlenberg believed that the Gothic style was "the true architectural expression of Christianity."

At the time it was built, the neighborhood around the church was still a fashionable residential area, with homes lining Sixth Avenue. By the late 19th century, as the city continued to expand uptown, the area had become part of the "Ladies' Mile" shopping district, with Sixth Avenue lined with giant department stores and dry goods emporia, which by World War I had all either moved uptown or closed.

The church had some esteemed organists and choirmasters, including Lynnwood Farnam from 1920 until his death in 1930, and Carl Weinrich from 1930 to 1943.

In 1975 the declining parish merged with those of Calvary Church, on Park Avenue South at East 21st Street, and St. George's Church, at Stuyvesant Square, and the combined parish of Calvary-St. George's the Church of the Holy Communion granted a ninety-nine year lease to the Lindisfarne Association.

The building became the Lindisfarne Association's headquarters from 1976 to 1979. Through the work of its founder William Irwin Thompson and start-up grants from the Lilly Endowment and the Rockefeller Brothers Fund, the church became a cultural center in which Gary Snyder, Robert Bly, Wendell Berry, Samuel Menash, and Kathleen Raine gave poetry readings, Paul Winter and David Hykes gave concerts, Jerzy Grotowksi and Andre Gregory lectured on theatre, and philosophers such as Gregory Bateson, Francisco Varela, and Thompson himself gave the lectures that became their subsequent books. Keith Critchlow and John Michel taught courses on sacred architecture, and representatives of world religions such as Nechung Rinpoche, Seyed Hosein Nasr, and Pir Vilayat Khan gave public presentations. The Lindisfarne Association, however, was unable to raise the funds to restore this historical landmark, consequently, Lindisfarne moved to Crestone, Colorado, and returned the church to the Episcopal parish.

The parish subsequently sold the building to Odyssey House, a drug rehabilitation program, in order to meet its fiscal obligations. Odyssey House, in turn, sold the buildings to nightclub entrepreneur Peter Gatien, who opened the New York Limelight club there in 1983.

=== Later uses ===
From 1983 until 2007, the church was utilized as a nightclub, The Limelight. After frequent problems with the police and charges of rampant drug abuse in the club, it was closed, but reopened in 2003 under the name "Avalon". It closed permanently in 2007. The church building during its time as the Limelight was the subject of the 1985 song "This Disco (Used to be a Cute Cathedral)" by singer Steve Taylor. The song's lyrics mentions the club's name and history. It is included in his album On The Fritz. A live version appears on his album, Limelight.

On May 7, 2010, the building was reopened as a retail mall called the Limelight Marketplace. It was promoted with a campaign which utilized advertisements on local buses, taxicabs, and billboards.

In the fall of 2014, the church was converted to a David Barton Gym. On December 21, 2016, this location as well as all four other David Barton Gym locations in NYC abruptly closed their door for business. In June 2017, it reopened as Limelight Fitness. By 2025, the Limelight location had been closed, and the church was available for sale or lease.

== See also ==
- Church of the Holy Communion, New Jersey
- Limelight (nightclub)
- St. George's Episcopal Church (Manhattan)
- Calvary Church (Manhattan)
- Church of the Holy Communion (St. Peter, Minnesota)
