= St. George's Episcopal Church (Manhattan) =

Church in Manhattan, New York

- U.S. National Register of Historic Places
- U.S. National Historic Landmark
- U.S. Historic district – Contributing property
- New York State Register of Historic Places
- New York City Landmark
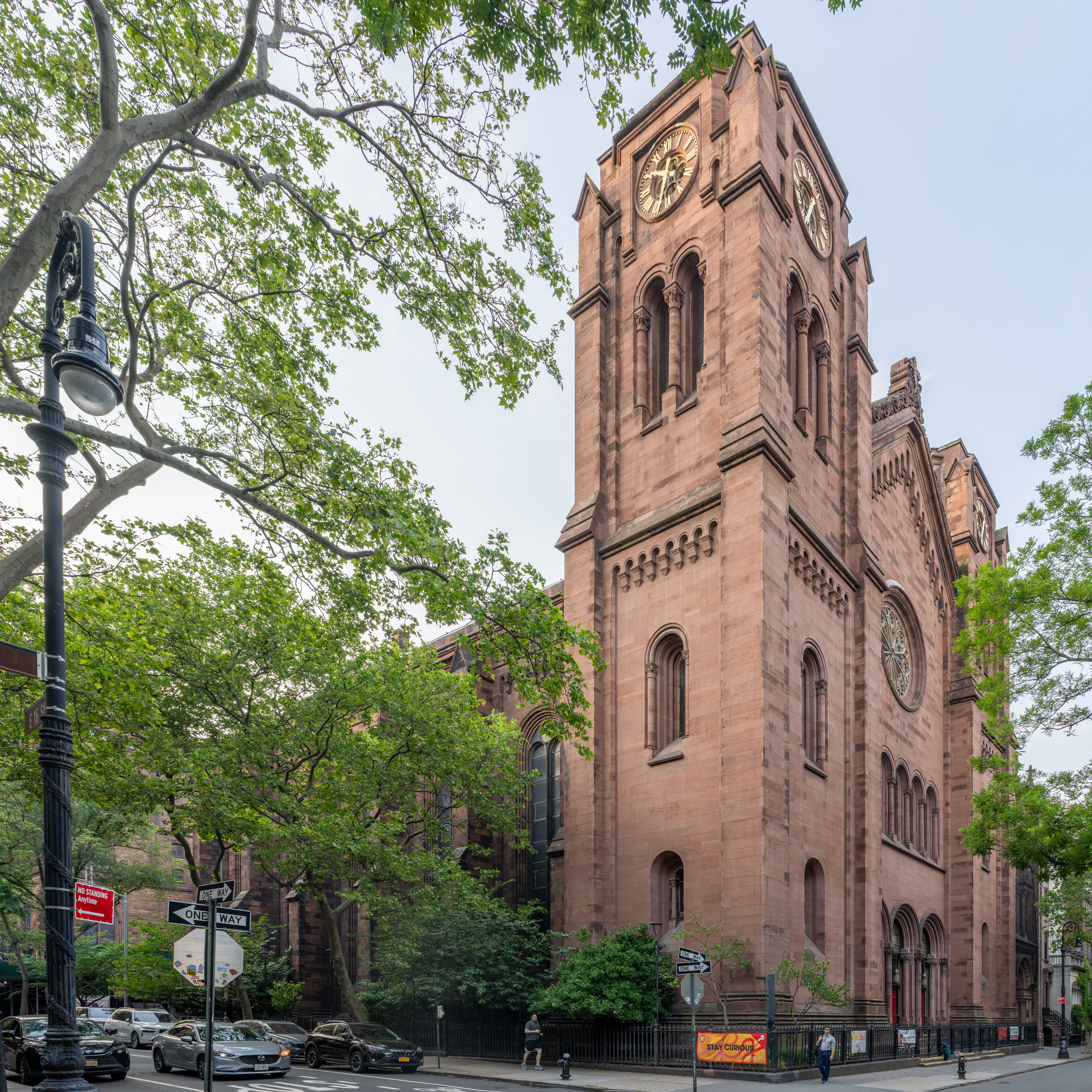

- Location within Manhattan Location within New York Location within the United States
- Location: 209 East 16th Street, Manhattan, New York City, New York
- Coordinates: 40°44′04″N 73°59′06″W
- Built: 1846–1856
- Architect: exterior: Otto Blesch interior: Leopold Eidlitz
- Architectural style: Romanesque Revival
- Part of: Stuyvesant Square Historic District (ID80002723)
- NRHP reference No.: 76001249
- NYSRHP No.: 06101.002718

Significant dates
- Added to NRHP: December 8, 1976
- Designated NHL: December 8, 1976
- Designated NYSRHP: February 28, 1980
- Designated NYCL: June 20, 1967

St. George's Episcopal Church is a historic church located at 209 East 16th Street at Rutherford Place, on Stuyvesant Square in Manhattan, New York City. Called "one of the first and most significant examples of Early Romanesque Revival church architecture in America", the church exterior was designed by Charles Otto Blesch and the interior by Leopold Eidlitz. It is one of the two sanctuaries of the Calvary-St. George's Parish.

== History ==
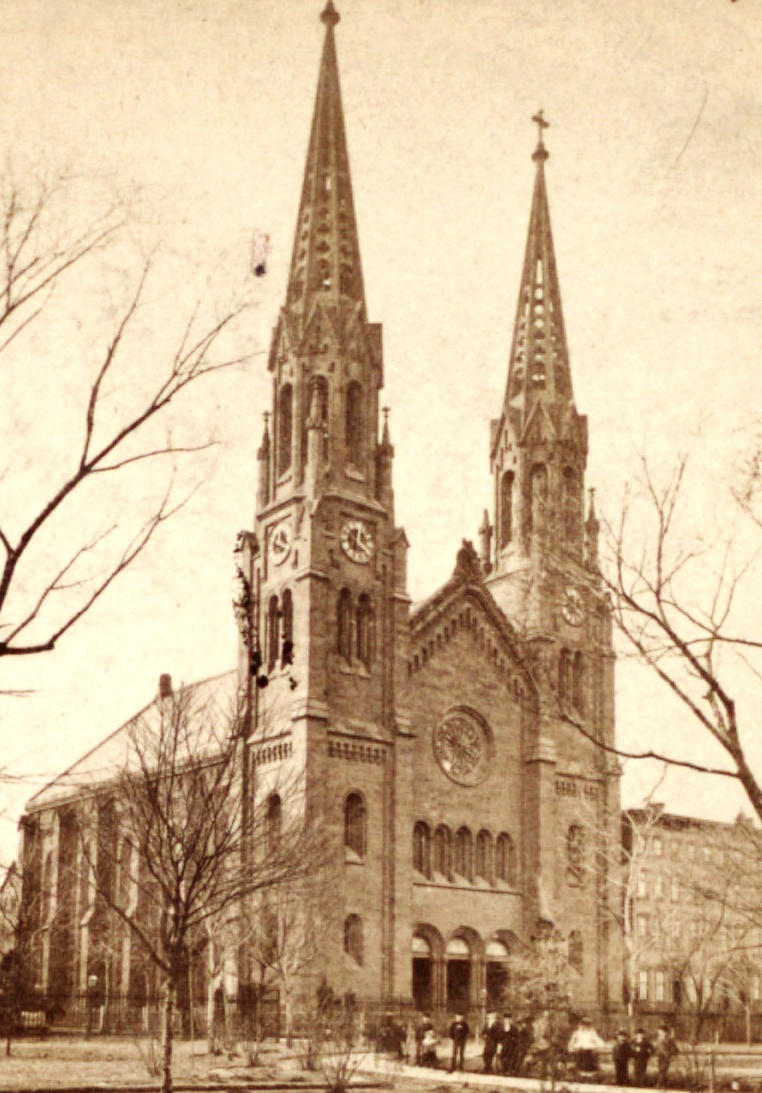
The church before its spires were removed in 1889

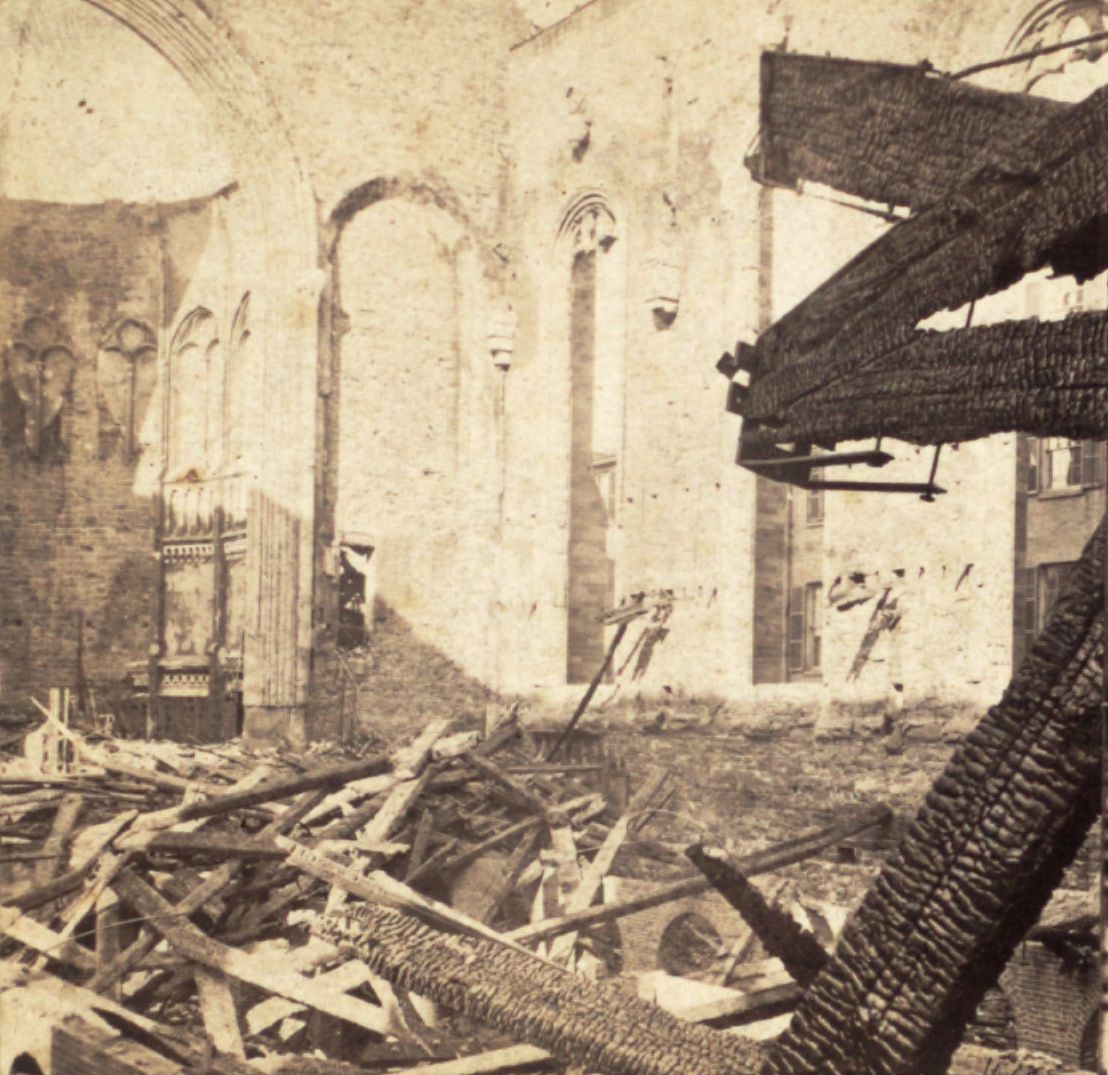
The interior of the church after the fire in 1865

The original St. George's was a chapel built in 1752 by Trinity Church on Chapel Street (now Beekman Street) in Lower Manhattan, for the convenience of its congregants who lived on the east side of the city. That building had a columned portico, arched windows and a hexagonal steeple. In 1811 the congregation became independent, and in 1846–1856 they built a new church uptown, on very fashionable Stuyvesant Square.

The architects of the new church were Charles Otto Blesch and Leopold Eidlitz. The exterior design, attributed to Blesch, was influenced by the Rundbogenstil (round-arch style) Ludwigskirche in Munich and the plain hall churches of Germany. Eidlitz designed the interior spaces. He also designed the rectory—also known as the Henry Hill Pierce House—which was built in the early 1850s. The spires on each tower of the church were completed almost a decade after the remainder of the building.

The church was gutted by fire in 1865, and was rebuilt within the next two years under the supervision of Eidlitz. The pastor of St. George's at the time of the reconstruction was Stephen H. Tyng, who was a leader in the evangelical wing of the Episcopal Church, and considered to be one of the most notable preachers of the time. Under his instructions, the interior of the rebuilt church reflected his views: the altar, for instance, was a plain table.

In 1889, more than twenty years after the church had been rebuilt, the spires on the two towers were removed.

For decades while J.P. Morgan was senior warden and the church's most influential parishioner, the church was colloquially referred to as "Morgan's Church". By 1880, the Episcopal church sat in the middle of a neighborhood filled with immigrants, who were largely Catholic and Jewish; its parishioners had moved elsewhere under pressure of new populations.

Through Morgan's initiative, the church brought in the Rev. William Stephen Rainsford as the new rector in 1883. Rainsford, who had experience with urban ministries, felt that "the whole aspect of the modern Protestant churches, in our large cities at least, is repellent to the poor man." His plan, of which Morgan approved, was to downplay doctrinal matters, abolish pew rentals, and offer secular social services programs aimed at helping the poor: an industrial school, sewing classes, soup kitchens, health programs, boys' and girls' clubs, and other educational and recreational initiatives. Morgan agreed to finance any deficits from these programs. Within seven years, the new direction of the church, combined with Rainsford's socially oriented preaching, had revitalized the congregation and made the church a leader in the institutional church movement.

Besides J. P. Morgan, another notable congregant of the church was Harry Thacker Burleigh, the spiritual singer and classical composer. He performed in the church choir for 50 years.

In 1976, the parish merged with two others—Calvary Church, which was founded in 1832 and moved to the Gramercy Park area in 1842, and the Church of the Holy Communion, built on Sixth Avenue in 1844—to form the Calvary-St George's Parish. Calvary Church is still operating, on Park Avenue South at 21st Street, but the Church of the Holy Communion was deconsecrated and sold to pay down the debts of the new combined parish. It was adapted as the Limelight disco. It then operated as a marketplace and from 2017 as a gym.

The church's facade was restored in 1980, though the primary preservation of facade stone was undertaken in 1985.

== Landmark designations ==
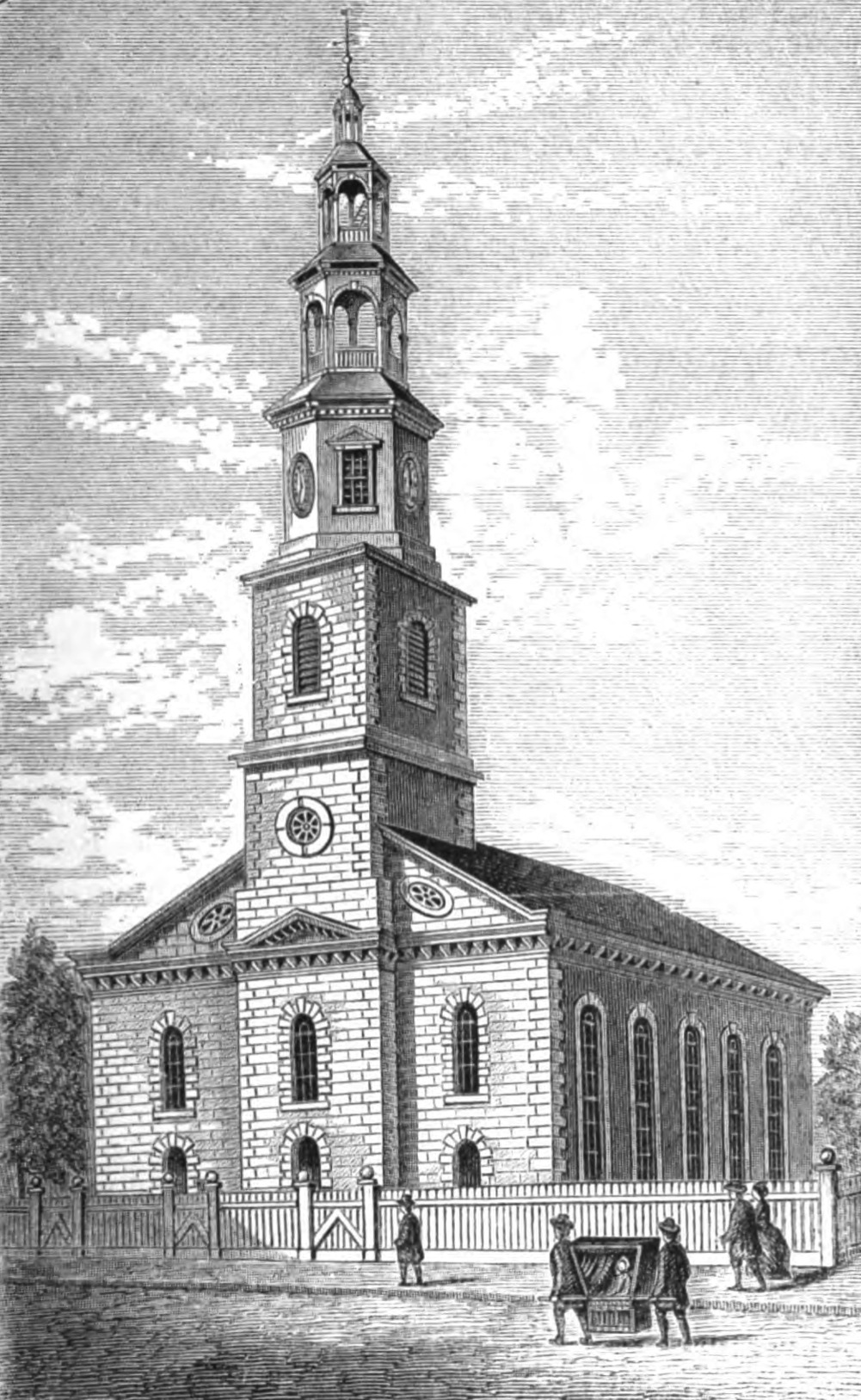
St. George's Chapel in Beekman Street, erected 1752.

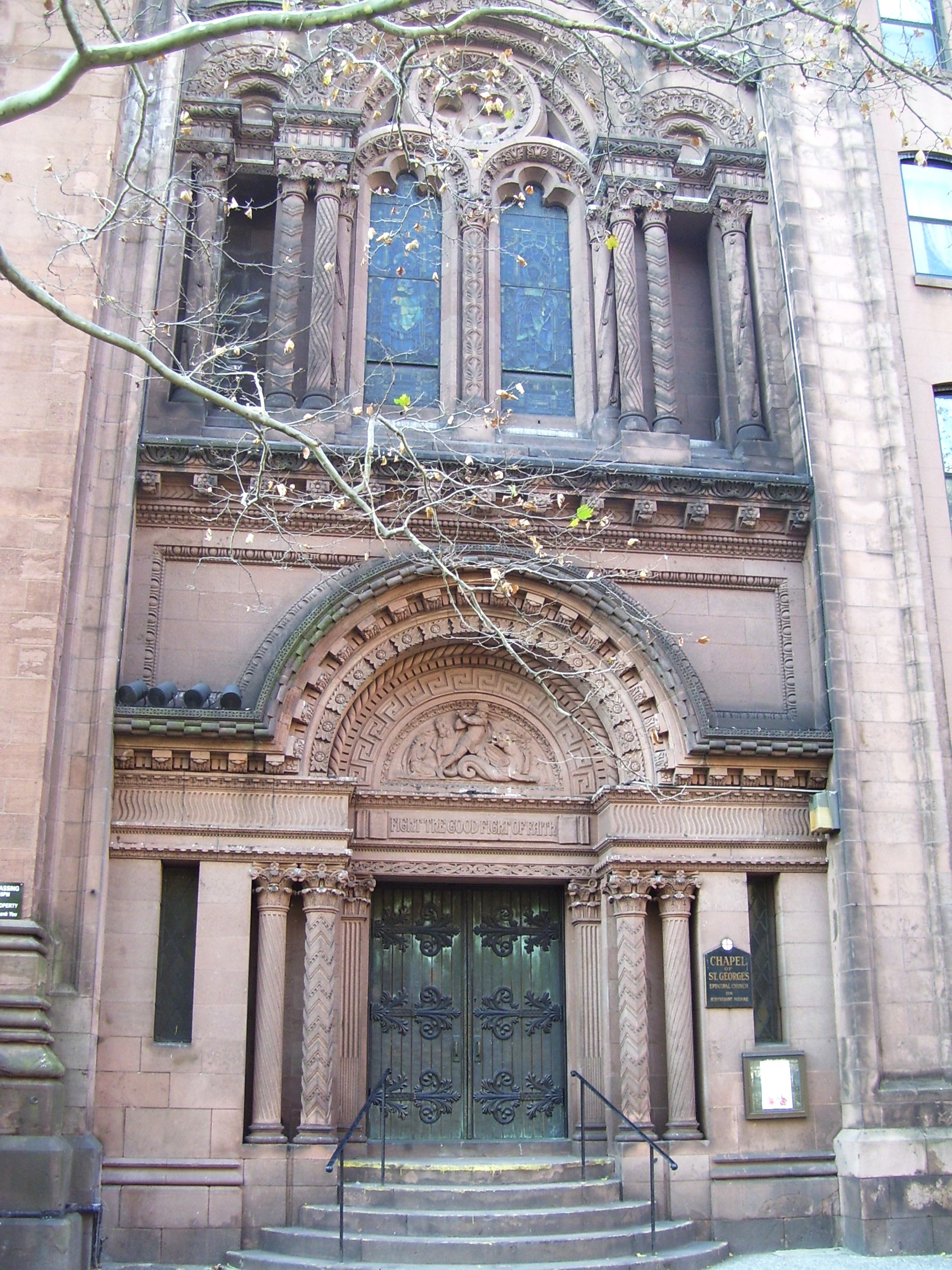
St. George's Chapel sits to the right of the church on Rutherford Place

The church is part of a complex of buildings which includes Eidlitz's rectory, and the St. George Memorial House at 207 East 16th Street, designed by his son, Cyrus L. W. Eidlitz, and built in 1886 as a gift from J. P. Morgan, as well as the neo-Romanesque St. George's Chapel by Matthew Lansing Emery and Henry George Emery, built in 1911–1912 All the buildings are part of the Stuyvesant Square Historic District, and the church itself is a New York City landmark, designated in 1967, and was named a National Historic Landmark in 1976.

== Rectors ==
- The Rev. James Milnor, D.D. (1773–1845), was rector at St. George's Chapel from 1816 until his death on April 8, 1845, in New York City.
- The Rev. William S. Rainsford (October 30, 1850 – December 17, 1933) was the rector from 1883 to 1906.

== See also ==
- The St. George
- Calvary-St George's Parish
- Saint George: Devotions, traditions and prayers
- Calvary Church (Manhattan)
- Church of the Holy Communion and Buildings, a deconsecrated church
