= Heather Buchman =

American conductor and trombonist (born 1965)

- Born: 1965 (age 60–61)
- Occupations: conductor and trombonist

Heather Buchman is an American conductor and trombonist. She is Professor of Music at Hamilton College in Clinton, NY, where she serves as director of the Hamilton College Orchestra and Chamber Music Program and Chair of the Department of Music. She has served as Education and Outreach Conductor for Symphoria, formerly the Syracuse Symphony. She has developed numerous innovative programs for Symphoria's Spark Series, as well as for the orchestral and chamber programs at Hamilton College. She appears frequently as conductor and trombonist with the Society for New Music and other organizations.

== Biography ==
Buchman was born in Canton, Ohio in 1965. She graduated from the Interlochen Arts Academy in 1983. In 1984 she was a winner of the New York Philharmonic Young Artists Concerto Competition. She received a bachelor's degree and performer's certificate in trombone from the Eastman School of Music in 1987. In 1988 she became Principal Trombone in the San Diego Symphony, and in 1989 was a prizewinner at the ARD International Music Competition in Munich, West Germany.

Buchman completed an M.M in orchestral conducting in 1999 at the University of Michigan. She also studied conducting at the Juilliard School from 1999 to 2001. Buchman's principal conducting teachers were Otto Werner Mueller, Kenneth Kiesler, Leonid Korchmar, and Oleg Proskurnya. She studied trombone with John Marcellus, Mark Lawrence, and Edward Zadrozny.

== Work ==
Buchman was principal trombonist in the San Diego Symphony from 1988 to 1997. Her appointment received significant press for being one of the first female principal brass positions in a major orchestra. In 1993, she won an Orchestra Recognition Award. Her playing has been called "stunning in performance" by trombonist, Cathy Leach. Rob Bridge, the president of the Society for New Music (SNM) has called Buchman a "vibrant, acclaimed, virtuoso trombonist, and professor."

Buchman's work in regional arts advocacy has been recognized by organizations, including the Society for New Music in 2013 and Civic Morning Musicals’ Ruth Edson Award in 2014. She serves on the board of CNY Arts, a regional organization for promoting and supporting arts and culture in Central New York, and helped lead the CNY Engage regional study of arts and culture in 2013–14.

In fall 2011, after the Chapter 7 bankruptcy of the Syracuse Symphony, Buchman organized a Summit on the Symphony to bring colleges and universities and arts organizations together from across Central New York to discuss the importance of having a professional orchestra in the region. The advocacy of this coalition, known as the Summit Group, was instrumental in the formation in December 2012 of Symphoria, the successor orchestra to the Syracuse Symphony.
