= Dana Buchman =

American fashion designer

Dana Buchman, Inc.
- Company type: Subsidiary
- Industry: Fashion
- Founded: United States
- Defunct: 2020
- Headquarters: New York City, United States
- Products: Women's clothing
- Parent: Kohl's
- Website: www.kohls.com

Dana Buchman was an upscale men's and women's fashion brand. Its founder, Dana Buchman, is an American fashion designer. The brand, which was most recently carried by Kohl's, was discontinued in 2020.

== History ==
Dana Buchman has been a member of the Council of Fashion Designers of America since 1991 and is currently a board member of the CFDA.

In 2008, Buchman announced that she would be discontinuing her higher priced line to design exclusively for Kohl's. In 2011, Liz Claiborne sold the Dana Buchman brand to Kohl's. Kohl's carried the line until 2020, when it dropped the line along with seven other women's brands in a move toward activewear.

== See also ==
- Liz Claiborne
- Mexx
- Lucky Brand Jeans
