= Calvary Church (Manhattan) =

Church in Manhattan, New York

Coordinates: 40°44′21″N 73°59′13″W

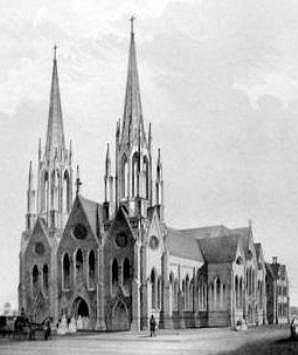
A contemporaneous drawing made prior to 1867 of the church with its original wooden spires

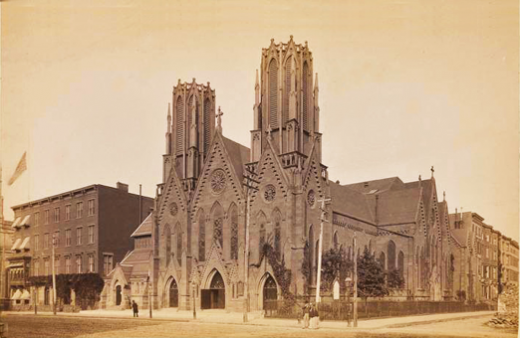
Photographic postcard of Calvary Church in the 1880s, after the removal of the spires but with their octagonal bases intact

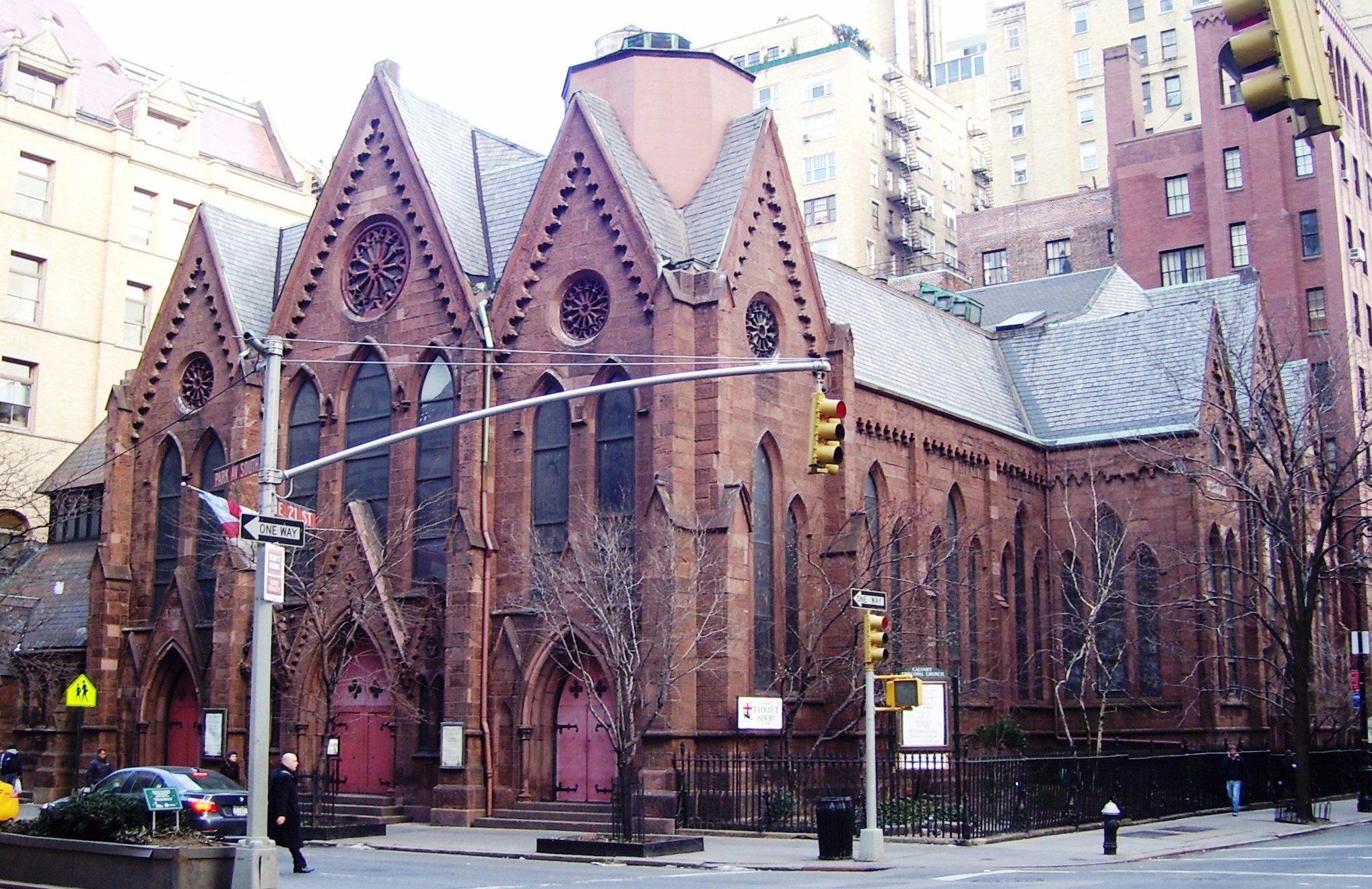
The church as it appeared in 2011; part of Calvary House can be seen on the right

Calvary Church is an Episcopal church located at 277 Park Avenue South on the corner of East 21st Street in the Gramercy Park neighborhood of Manhattan, New York City, on the border of the Flatiron District. It was designed by James Renwick Jr., the architect who designed St. Patrick's Cathedral and Grace Church, and was completed in 1848. The church complex is located within the Gramercy Park Historic District and Extension. It is one of the two sanctuaries of the Calvary-St. George's Parish.

== History ==
The Calvary Church parish was founded in 1832, and initially used a wooden-frame church on what was then Fourth Avenue – which has since become Park Avenue – uptown of its current site. That building was moved to the current location in 1842, and the new Renwick-designed Gothic Revival sanctuary was completed in 1848. Renwick patterned Calvary after twin-towered French cathedrals, but, unlike Grace Church, Calvary was constructed of brownstone. The church's two wooden spires were removed in September 1860 when they became unstable; the octagonal bases remained but eventually deteriorated and were removed in 1929.

The church complex also includes the nine-story Calvary House, east of the church on Gramercy Park North (East 21st Street), also designed by Renwick, and built in 1867, and the "Renwick Gem" Schoolhouse, a small building to the north of the church which was built as a theatre but used for that purpose only for a short time before being utilized for the Calvary Church Sunday school. It has a large interior space, about 27 feet (8.2 m) between the columns, which were designed to hold up the heavy slate roof without the use of exterior buttresses. The building, which as of 2011 houses the 4th and 5th grade classes of the École Internationale de New York, compensates for the shadowing of the taller buildings around through Renwick's use of 42 clerestory windows.

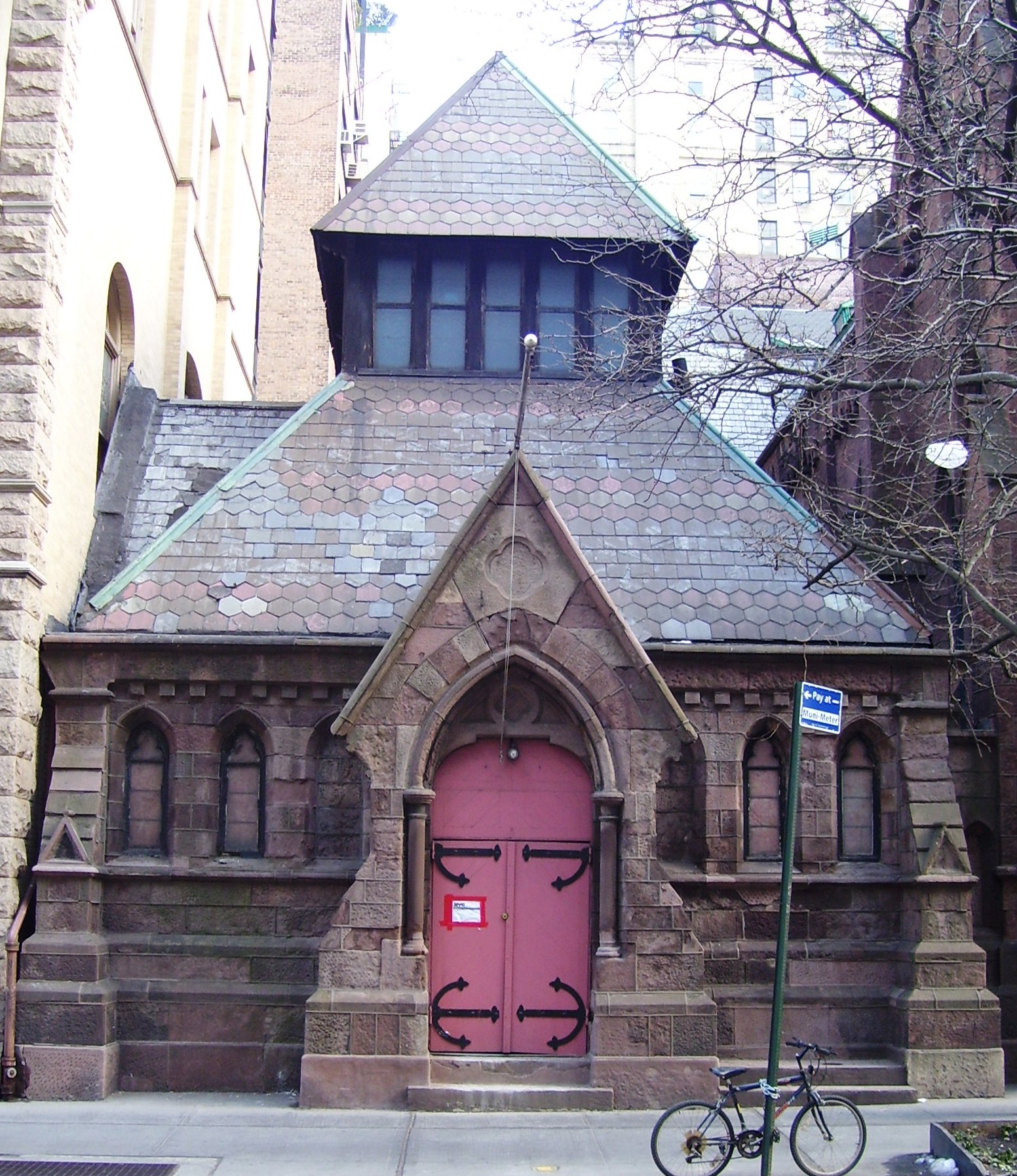
The "Renwick Gem" Schoolhouse

The family of Theodore Roosevelt lived two blocks away from Calvary Church from 1854 to 1872 – Roosevelt was born in their house in 1858, and Calvary was the church the family belonged to. Other congregants included members of the Astor and Vanderbilt families.

The church enjoys a close historical association with the Washington National Cathedral. In 1896, the rector of Calvary, Henry Yates Satterlee, was consecrated the first Episcopal Bishop of Washington in a ceremony in Calvary Church. Satterlee was instrumental in procuring Mount Saint Alban as the site for the cathedral, and he laid the cathedral's main cornerstone in 1907. The parishioners of Calvary donated the church's baptismal font to the new cathedral, and it is located in the Bethlehem Chapel.

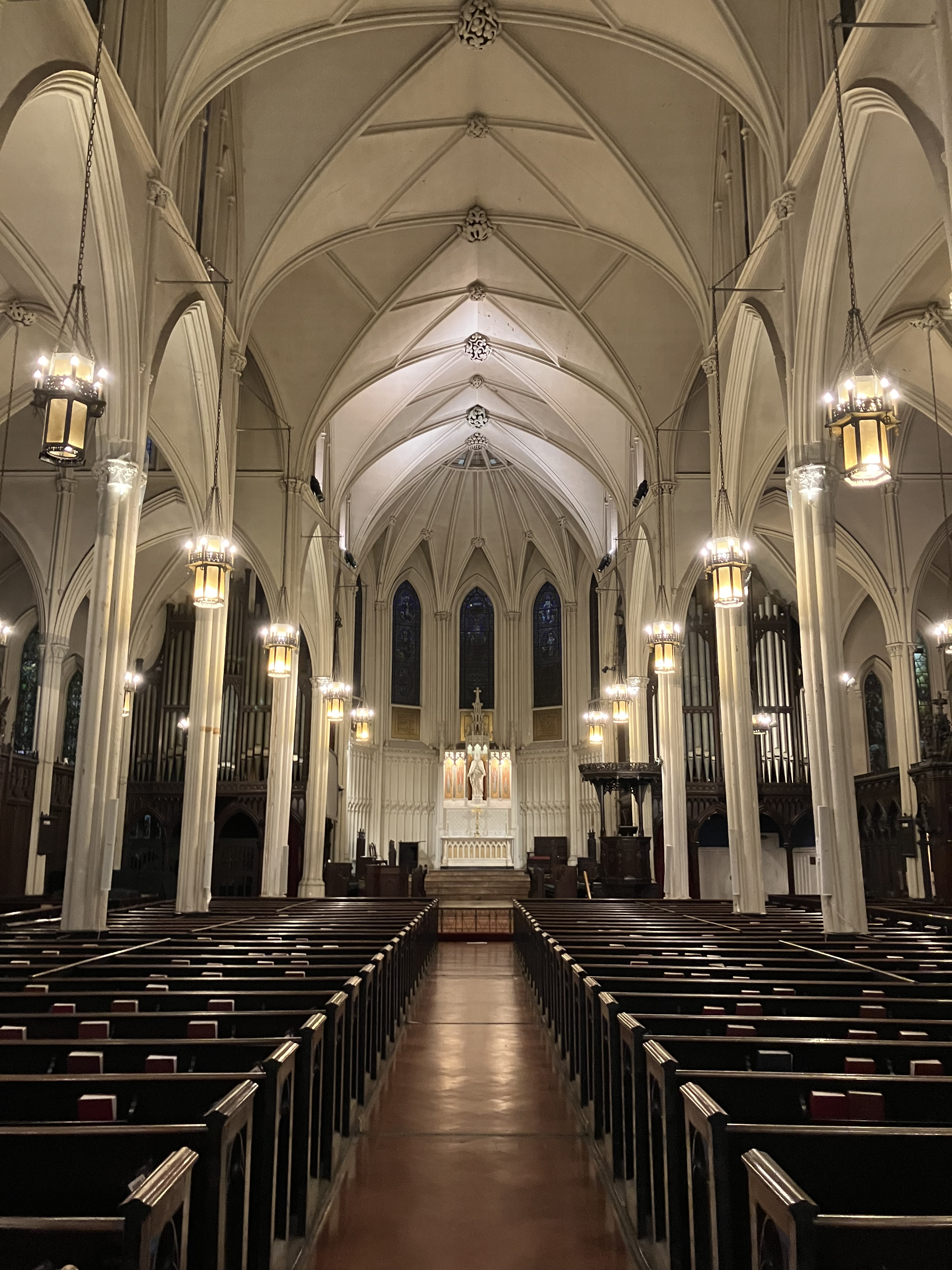
View towards the altar from the church's rear

Calvary has a strong connection to Alcoholics Anonymous. When the Rev. Dr. Samuel Shoemaker was the minister there, from 1925 to 1952, Calvary House became the American center of the Oxford Group, from which came some of A.A.'s major underlying ideas. Bill Wilson, the co-founder of the twelve-step group, wrote: "It is through Sam Shoemaker that most of A.A.'s spiritual principles have come. Sam is one of the great channels, one of the prime sources of influences that have gathered themselves into what is now A.A."

In 1976, facing financial difficulty, Calvary parish merged with the nearby parishes of St. George's Church and the Church of the Holy Communion. The Holy Communion buildings were deconsecrated and sold to pay down the debts of the new combined parish, eventually becoming the Limelight disco, and the remaining two churches continued to operate as Calvary-St. George's Parish. Calvary House is now rented out as offices.

== Notable people ==
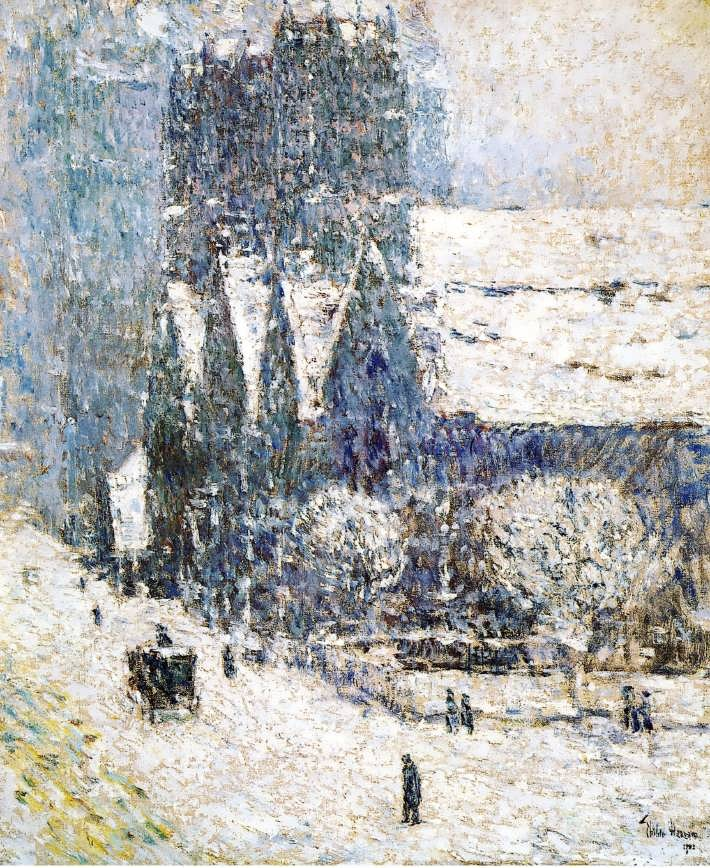
Calvary Church in the Snow (1893) by Childe Hassam

Notable clergymen, parishioners, and others associated with Calvary Church have included:

- Chester A. Arthur (1829–1886) – The future 21st President of the United States was married to Ellen Lewis Herndon in Calvary Church on October 25, 1859.
- John Jacob Astor III (1822–1890) – Astor, a parishioner who married Charlotte Augusta Gibbes in Calvary Church on December 9, 1846, was a financier and philanthropist and the father of William Waldorf Astor, 1st Viscount Astor.
- Alva Belmont (1853–1933) – Alva Erskine Smith married William Kissam Vanderbilt at Calvary Church on April 20, 1875, in what was "reported as 'the grandest wedding witnessed in [New York City] for many years.'" Their only daughter was Consuelo Vanderbilt. After the death of her second husband, Oliver Belmont, Alva Belmont became a major figure in the women's suffrage movement.
- Edward Morris Bowman (1848–1913) – Organist and choirmaster at Calvary Church from 1906 until his death in 1913. Bowman was a conductor and organist of national reputation who had served as the head of the music department at Vassar College, the founder of the American College of Musicians, and three time president of the Music Teachers National Association.
- Charles Loring Brace (1826–1890) – A parishioner and a prominent social reformer, Brace is considered a father of the modern foster care movement and was most renowned for starting the Orphan Train movement of the mid-19th century and for founding The Children's Aid Society; he is commemorated in a window in Calvary's chapel.
- Benjamin Brewster (1860–1941) – After serving as a vicar at Calvary (1887–1891), Brewster was consecrated Missionary Bishop of Western Colorado and Bishop of Maine.
- Arthur Cleveland Coxe (1818–1896) – Coxe, who became rector of Calvary in 1863, was consecrated as the second bishop of Western New York in 1865.
- Rebecca Salome Foster (1848–1902) – missionary/prison relief worker known as the "Tombs Angel" because she attended to criminals incarcerated at the New York Halls of Justice and House of Detention (otherwise known as "The Tombs"). At her February 1902 funeral "All of the court officers of the Courts of General Sessions the Criminal Branch of the Supreme Court and the Court of Special Sessions attended."
- Archibald Gracie IV (1858–1912) – American Army Officer and Titanic Survivor. Calvary was the scene of both his marriage and his funeral.
- Henry Wellington Greatorex (1816–1853) – English-born organist at Calvary whose setting for the "Gloria Patri" is widely used to this day in Protestant denominations for the singing of the doxology.
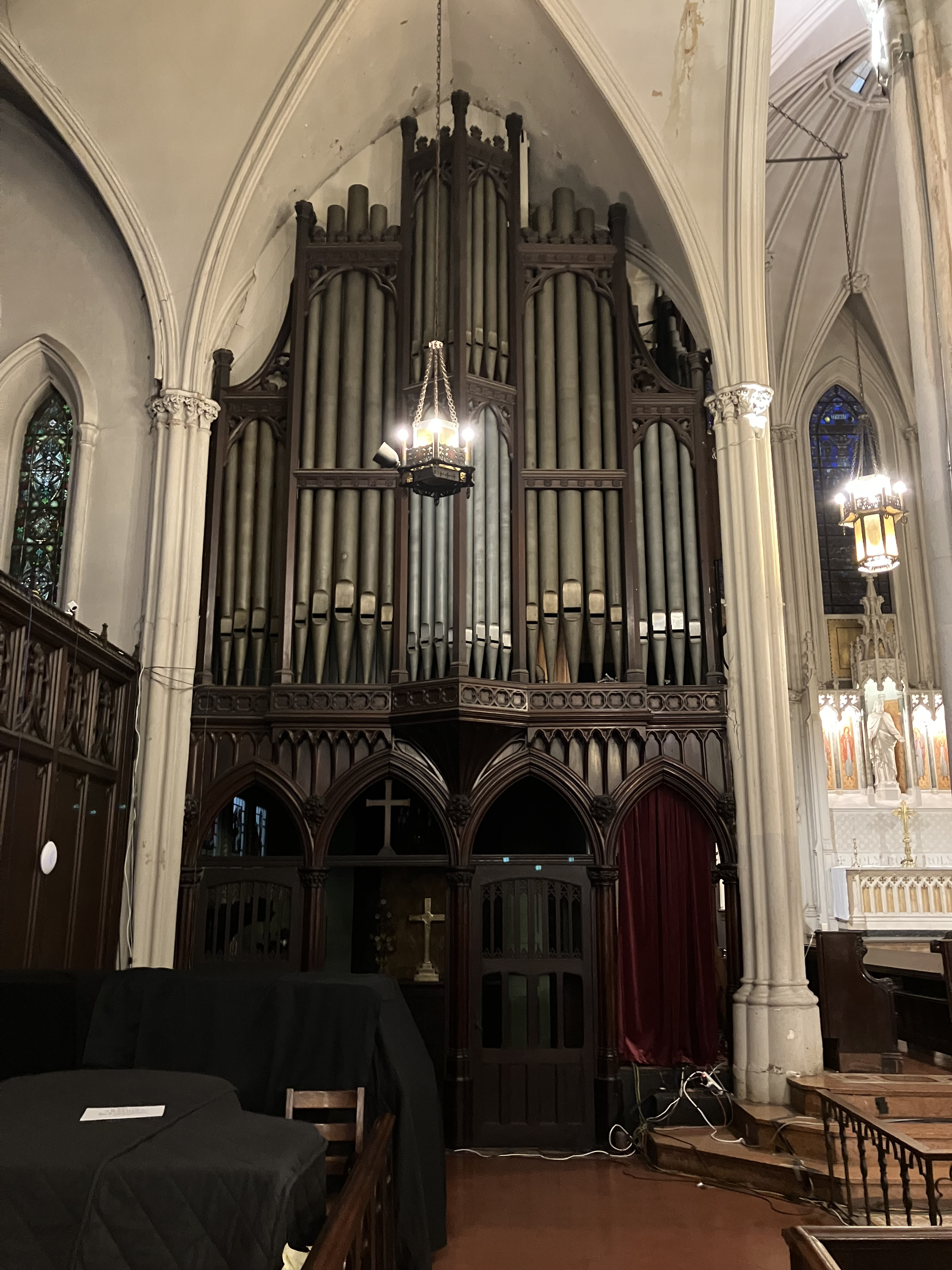
  Organ case in the northern nave
- Calvin Hampton (1938–1984) – Calvin Hampton, a leading American organist and sacred music composer, served as Calvary's organist and choirmaster from 1963 to 1983.
- Childe Hassam (1859–1935) – Calvary Church was depicted by the American Impressionist artist Childe Hassam. Works featuring the church include "Calvary Church in the Snow," painted in 1893.
- Francis Lister Hawks (1798–1866) – Rector from 1850 until 1862, Dr. Hawks was a scholar, the Historiographer of the Protestant Episcopal Church, and editor of Appletons' Cyclopædia of Biography (1856).
- Philip Kearny (1815–1862) – Parishioner who was a major general in the United States Army, notable for his leadership in the Mexican–American War and American Civil War; killed in action in the Battle of Chantilly.
- James Kent (1763–1847) – Jurist, legal scholar, chief justice of the New York Supreme Court, and Chancellor of New York who attended Calvary, lastly for his funeral in 1847.
- General George B. McClellan (1826–1885) – General McClellan, the major general during the American Civil War who organized the Army of the Potomac, was married in Calvary Church on May 22, 1860.
- James Renwick Jr. (1818–1895) – Architect of the present building.

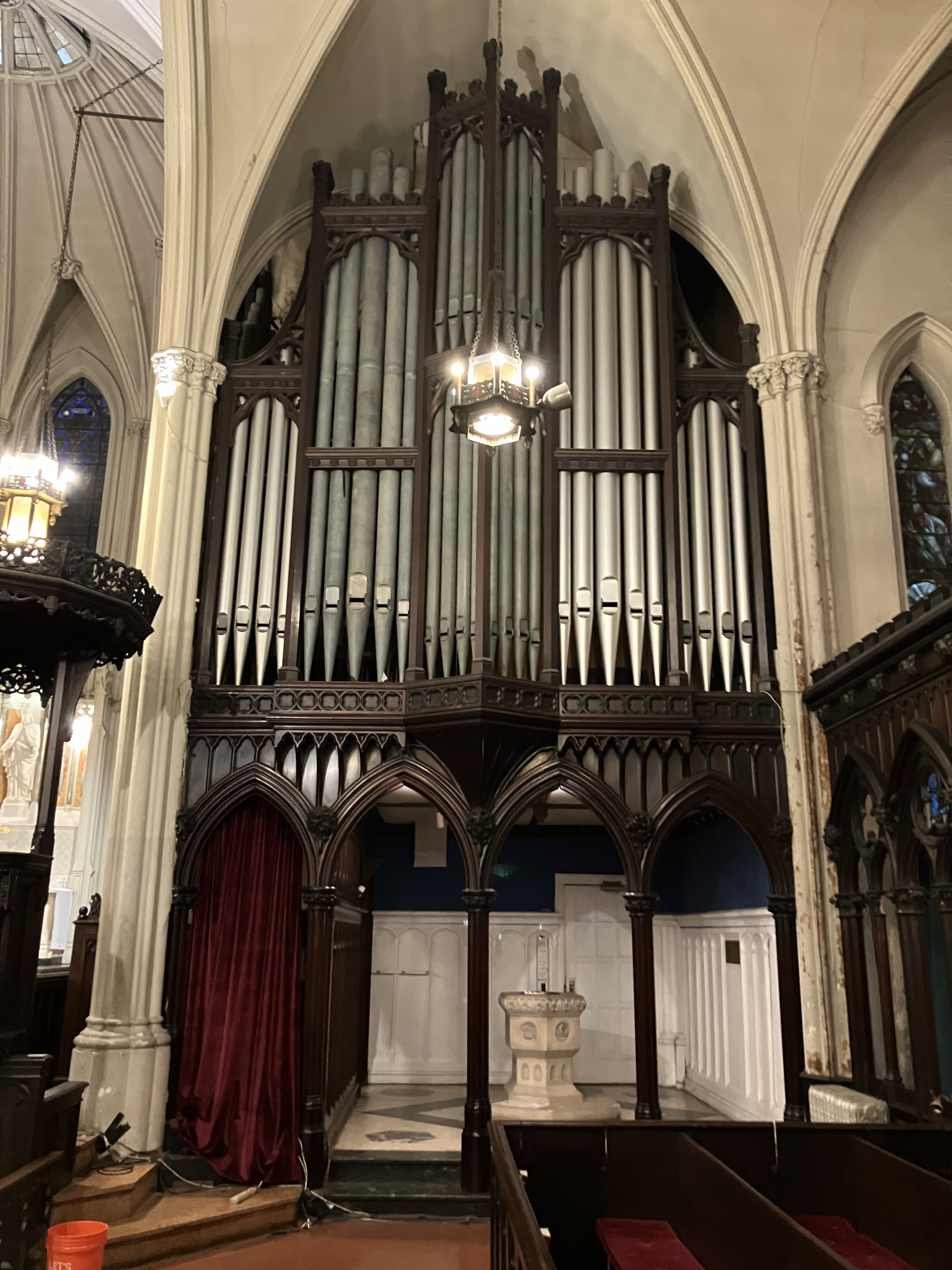
Organ case in the southern nave

- Eleanor Roosevelt (1884–1962) – Like several members of the Roosevelt family, the future First Lady of the United States was a Calvary Church parishioner. Her parents, Elliott Bulloch Roosevelt and Anna Rebecca Hall, were married in Calvary Church on December 1, 1883. Eleanor Roosevelt was baptized at Calvary Church in 1885 with her uncle, the future President of the United States Theodore Roosevelt, standing godfather.
- Henry Yates Satterlee (1843–1908) – Satterlee was rector of Calvary from 1882 to 1896 before becoming first Episcopal Bishop of Washington.
- Samuel Moor Shoemaker (1893–1963) – The Reverend Dr. Samuel Moor Shoemaker, Calvary's rector from 1925 to 1952, is remembered as a co-founder and spiritual leader of Alcoholics Anonymous.
- Jonathan Mayhew Wainwright (1792–1854) – Dr. Wainwright was elected rector in 1850; he was instrumental in the founding of New York University and was later a bishop.
- Edith Wharton (1862–1937) – The George Frederick Jones family, including young Edith Newbold Jones, lived in the parish and worshipped at Calvary. The rector's daughter, Emelyn Washburn, introduced Edith to Goethe, who became her favorite writer. Calvary was used as the setting for Mrs. Wharton's 1920 Pulitzer Prize-winning novel, The Age of Innocence, and Dr. Ashmore, a character in the novel, was modeled after the Rev. Edward Washburn (rector, 1865–81).

== Pipe organs ==
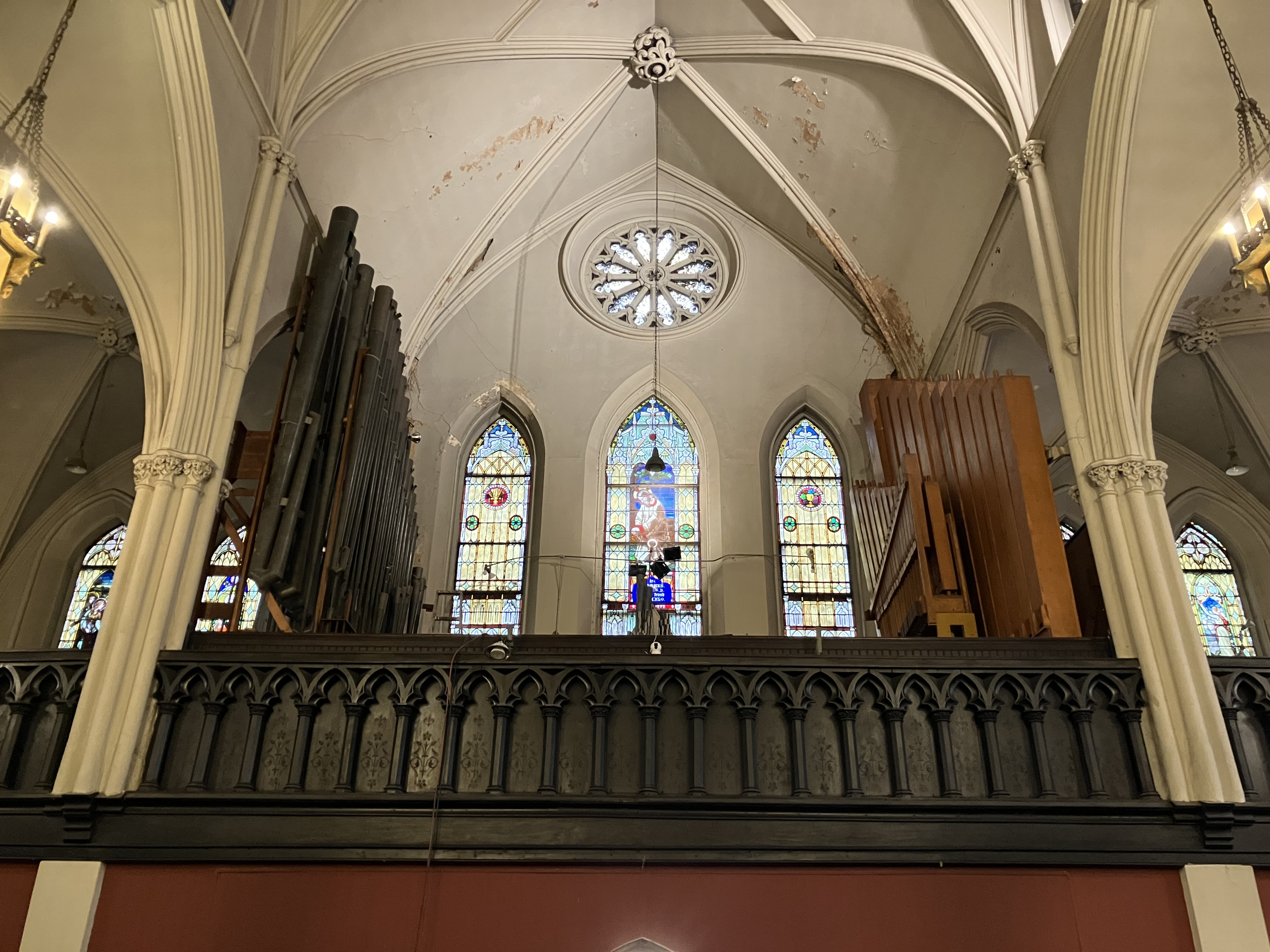
Pipework on the organ loft at the West End

The first organ installed in the church was built by William H. Davis and Richard M. Ferris and rebuilt by Levi U. Stuart in 1868. This organ was later sold.

In 1886, Hilborne and Frank Roosevelt of Roosevelt Organ Works installed their Opus 374, a three-manual instrument with 42 stops / 52 ranks in the Chancel and 41 stops / 49 ranks on the West End, with electro-pneumatic action. The organ was rebuilt and improved by Ernest M. Skinner in 1907.

In April 1936, a new organ was built by the Aeolian-Skinner Organ Company which retained 15 stops from the Roosevelt organ. The new organ, Aeolian-Skinner's Opus 945, with four manuals and 64 stops / 71 ranks was voiced by Donald G. Harrison. Additional revisions and enlargements were done from 1963 to 1983 by curator Randolph Gilberti and organist Calvin Hampton.

== See also ==
- Calvary-St George's Parish
- St. George's Episcopal Church (Manhattan)
- Church of the Holy Communion and Buildings, a deconsecrated church
- Grace Church (Manhattan)
