= M. L. Buchman =

American novelist

- Born: Matthew Lieber Buchman; 1958 (age 67–68)
- Occupation: Novelist
- Spouse: married (1999–present)
- Children: 1
- Writing career
- Genres: Thriller, Romance, Fantasy, Science fiction
- Website: www.mlbuchman.com

M. L. Buchman is the penname of American author Matthew Lieber Buchman. His novels have been critically acclaimed by Booklist three-times as "Top 101 Romance Novels of the Last 10 Years", by NPR as one of the "Top 5 Romance Novel[s] of 2012", and by Barnes & Noble as one of the "Best 5 Romance [Novels] of 2013". He has worked in IT at Seattle Opera, and as a specialist in applying lean principles in legal and manufacturing environments. He also has ridden his bicycle on an 18-month, 11,000-mile solo tour around the world.

== Bibliography ==
=== Thriller Novels ===
Miranda Chase

- Drone (Nov 2019)
- Thunderbolt (Dec 2019)
- Condor (Mar 2020)
- Ghostrider (Jun 2020)
- Raider (Jan 2021)
- Chinook (Mar 2021)
- Havoc (Apr 2021)
- White Top (May 2021)
- Start the Chase - collection (Oct 2021)
- Lightning (Jun 2022)
- Skibird (Oct 2022)
- Nightwatch (Jan 2023)
- Osprey (Sep 2023)
- Gryphon (Jan 2024)
- Wedgetail (Dec 2024)
- Air Force One (Sep 2025)

Kate Stark

- Final Taste (Apr 2025)
- Ice Burn (May 2025)
- Knife's Edge (Jun 2025)

=== Thriller Short Stories ===
Miranda Chase

- Galaxy (Mar 2020)
- Honor Flight (Jul 2020)
- Island Christmas (Dec 2020)

Dead Chef

- Iced Chef! (Jan 2015)
- Gas Grilled Chef! (Apr 2015)
- Christmas Cookied Chef! (May 2019)

=== Thrill Ride - the Magazine ===
(Editor and contributor) Year One

- Honor (Mar 2023)
- Unlikely Partners (Jun 2023)
- No W.W.M. (Western White Males) (Sep 2023)
- Betrayal (Dec 2023)

Year Two

- Sisters-in-Arms (Mar 2024)
- Gadgets (Jun 2024)
- Adventure (Sep 2024)
- Lone Wolves (Dec 2024)

=== Romantic Suspense Novels ===
Firehawks

- Pure Heat (May 2014)
- Full Blaze (Dec 2014)
- Hot Point (Aug 2015)
- Flash of Fire (May 2016)
- Wild Fire (Dec 2016)

Firehawks Smokejumper series

- Wildfire at Dawn (May 2014)
- Wildfire at Larch Creek (Feb 2015)
- Wildfire on the Skagit (Jun 2015)

The Night Stalkers (in reading order, not pub order)

- The Night Is Mine (Feb 2012)
- I Own the Dawn (Aug 2012)
- Wait Until Dark (Feb 2013)
- Take Over at Midnight (Dec 2013)
- Light Up the Night (Sep 2014)
- Bring on the Dusk (Mar 2015)
- By Break of Day (Feb 2016)
- Target of the Heart (Mar 2015)
- Target Lock on Love (Oct 2015)
- Target of Mine (Jan 2017)
- Target of One's Own (Jan 2019)

The Night Stalkers Holidays (in reading order, not pub order)

- Daniel's Christmas (Nov 2012)
- Frank's Independence Day (May 2013)
- Peter's Christmas (Sep 2013)
- Christmas at Steel Beach (Nov 2014)
- Zachary's Christmas (Dec 2015)
- Roy's Independence Day (Jun 2016)
- Damian's Christmas (Nov 2016)
- Christmas at Peleliu Cove (Nov 2015)

Night Stalkers Reload

- Guard the East Flank (Jun 2024)
- Hold the West Line (Feb 2026)

Delta Force

- Target Engaged (Dec 2015)
- Heart Strike (Aug 2016)
- Wild Justice (Oct 2017)
- Midnight Trust (Oct 2018)

White House Protection Force

- Off the Leash (Jan 2018)
- On Your Mark (Feb 2018)
- In the Weeds (Jul 2018)

Shadow Force: Psi

- At the Slightest Sound (Sep 2019)
- At the Quietest Word (Oct 2019)
- At the Merest Glance (Aug 2020)
- At the Clearest Sensation (Sep 2020)

=== Romantic Suspense Short Stories ===
Fire Lookouts

- Looking for the Fire (Aug 2014)
- Fire at Gray Wolf Summit (May 2015)
- Blaze Atop Swallow Hill Lookout (Aug 2015)
- Summer of Fire and Heart (Feb 2016)
- Together atop Sapphire Lookout (Nov 2016)

Firehawks Hotshots

- Fire Light, Fire Bright (Nov 2014)
- Firelights of Christmas (Dec 2014)
- Fire Light Cabin Bright (Nov 2015)
- Road to the Fire's Heart (Feb 2016)
- A Hotshot's Christmas (Dec 2016)

Firebirds

- They'd Most Certainly Be Flying (Jan 2018)
- For All Their Days (Feb 2018)
- When They Just Know (Mar 2018)
- They Both Hold the Truth (Apr 2018)
- Twice the Heat (May 2018)

The Night Stalkers

- Ghost of Willows Past (Oct 2013)
- Man the Guns, My Mate (Sep 2014)
- Heart of the Storm (Feb 2015)
- Beale's Hawk Down (Mar 2015)
- Flight to Fight (Sep 2015)
- Circle Round (Feb 2017)
- First Day Every Day (Sep 2017)
- Flying Over the Hindu Kush (Oct 2019)
- Sweet Tooth (Jan 2020)
- Emily's First Flight (Aug 2020)

The Night Stalkers 5E

- Love Behind the Lines (Aug 2016)
- Flying Over the Waves (Apr 2017)
- Since the First Day (Jun 2017)
- The Christmas Lights Objective (Dec 2017)
- Sergeant George and the Dragoon (Sep 2018)

The Future Night Stalkers

- The Sword of Io (Jul 2014)
- Night Rescue (Jul 2015)
- Second Chance Rescue (May 2016)
- Hearts Refuge (Feb 2017)
- Mirror Moon Light, Mirror Moon Bright (Jan 2019)
- They Taught Us Wrong (Mar 2019)

The Night Stalkers CSAR (combat search and rescue)

- Dawn Flight (Jun 2015)
- NSDQ (Sep 2016)
- Night and Day (Sep 2016)
- Guardian of the Heart (Mar 2017)
- Love in a Cooper Light (Jul 2017)
- Just Shy of a Dream (Oct 2018)
- Team Black Sheep (May 2020)
- Survive Until the Final Scene (Sep 2020)
- Storm's Gift (Oct 2020)
- Swiftwater Rescue (Nov 2020)

The Night Stalkers Weddings

- Emily's Wedding (Sep 2017)
- Kee's Wedding (Nov 2017)
- Connie's Wedding (Aug 2018)

US Coast Guard

- Crossing the Bar (Feb 2019)
- Flying Beyond the Bar (Apr 2019)
- Christmas Over the Bar (Dec 2019)
- Cave Rescue Courtship (Mar 2020)
- Lifeboat Love (Apr 2020)

Delta Force

- Lightning Strike to the Heart (Jan 2016)
- For Her Dark Eyes Only (Mar 2016)
- Her Silent Heart and the Open Sky (Jun 2016)
- What the Heart Holds Safe (Oct 2016)
- Love's Second Chance (Jan 2017)
- Sound of her Warrior Heart (May 2017)
- Her Heart and the Friend Command (Aug 2017)
- Love in the Drop Zone (Oct 2017)
- Delta Mission: Operation Rudolf (Nov 2017)
- Play the Right Cards (Jul 2018)
- Carrying the Heart's Load (Feb 2020)

White House Protection Force

- Dilya's Christmas Challenge (Dec 2018)
- Between Shadow and Soul (Oct 2019)
- Flower of Destiny (Jun 2020)

=== Contemporary Romance Novels ===
Where Dreams

- Where Dreams Are Born (Nov 2011)
- Where Dreams Reside (Apr 2013)
- When Dreams Are of Christmas (Oct 2013)
- Where Dreams Unfold (Apr 2014)
- Where Dreams Are Written (Apr 2014)

Eagle Cove

- Return to Eagle Cove (Mar 2016)
- Recipe for Eagle Cove (Apr 2016)
- Longing for Eagle Cove (Jul 2016)
- Keepsake for Eagle Cove (Aug 2016)

Henderson's Ranch

- Nathan's Big Sky (Apr 2017)
- Big Sky, Loyal Heart (Nov 2017)
- Big Sky Dog Whisperer (Mar 2019)

Love Abroad B&B

- Heart of the Cotswods: England (Jun 2017)
- Path of Love: Cinque Terre, Italy (Apr 2018)

Dilya's Dog Force

- The Disappearance Cipher (Apr 2024)

=== Contemporary Romance Stories ===
Where Dreams

- Where Dreams Taste Like Chocolate (Oct 2014)
- Where Dreams Are Sewn (Sep 2015)
- Where Dreams Are Well Done (Dec 2015)
- Where Dreams Thrive (Dec 2020)

Eagle Cove

- Lost Love Found in Eagle Cove (Jul 2016)

Henderson's Ranch

- Christmas at Henderson's Ranch (Oct 2015)
- Reaching Out at Henderson's Ranch (Apr 2016)
- Welcome at Henderson's Ranch (Mar 2017)
- Finding Henderson's Ranch (Jun 2018)
- Emily's Christmas Gift (Dec 2018)

=== Fantasy and Other Novels ===
Deities Anonymous (fantasy)

- Cookbook From Hell: Reheated (Jul 2013))
- Saviors 101: the first book of the Reluctant Messiah (Jul 2013)

Single Title

- Cookbook From Hell (fantasy) (Oct 1997)
- The Dalari Accord (science fiction) (Jan 2000)
- Monk's Maze (fantasy) (Dec 2010)
- Nara (science fiction) (Mar 2014)
- The Me and Elsie Chronicles (and Jen too) (science fiction) (Aug 2016)

=== Fantasy and Other Stories ===
Deities Anonymous

- The Gods Are Out Inn (Jul 2017)
- The Appletart of Eden (Oct 2019)

Science Fiction Romance

- Inside the Sphere (May 2013)
- the Royale Project (Jul 2013)
- Relive the Day! (Jul 2013)
- Androcles the Christmas Lion: Betsy (Dec 2014)
- Dreams of Crystal (Dec 2019)

Other

- Hitomi's Path (Jul 2014)
- Cops and Fathers (Apr 2018)
- The Sixth Choice (Nov 2018)

=== Non-fiction ===
Strategies for Success

- Managing Your Inner Artist / Writer (Jan 2014)
- Estate Planning for Authors (Jul 2017)
- Character Voice (Mar 2019)
- Narrate and Record Your Own Audiobook (Sep 2019)
- Beyond Prince Charming (Sep 2023)

Other

- Mid-Life Crisis on Wheels: a bicycle journey around the world (Oct 2019)

== Significant Reviews ==
- Three (3) titles on Booklist's "The 101 Best Romance Novels of the Last 10 Years."
- Hot Point: Booklist's "Top 10 Romance Novel of 2015."
- Light Up the Night: RT Book Reviews' "2014 Reviewer's Choice Award Nominee."
- The Night Is Mine: Booklist's "Top 10 Romance Novel of 2012."
- I Own the Dawn: NPR's "Top 5 Romance Novel of 2012."
- Take Over at Midnight: Barnes & Noble's "Best 5 Romance of 2013."
- Pure Heat: Publishers Weekly's "Top 10 Romance/Erotica Spring 2014."
- Target Engaged: Romance Writers of America's "RITA Finalist 2016."

== Significant Interviews ==
- Publishers Weekly Radio
- The Creative Penn Podcast: Estate Planning For Authors
- Write at the Edge: Embrace Your Full Throttle Creativity
- Stark Reflections Podcast: Strong Authors and the IP Legacies They Deserve
