= Alex Buchman =

American Trotskyist (1911–2003)

Alexander Buchman (1911–2003) was an American Trotskyist.

Buchman was born May 16, 1911, in Cleveland, Ohio.

In 1933, he traveled to Japan but was deported due to perceived communist ties. Buchman went to China and spent six years in Shanghai, where he encountered Trotskyist Wang Fanxi, a leader of the Chinese Left Opposition. In July 1939 he became publisher of the journal Dongxiang. In 1939, Buchman moved to Mexico. From autumn 1939 to April 1940, Buchman lived in Coyoacán and worked as one of Trotsky's guards. As an amateur photographer, Buchman documented Trotsky's last year of life.

Buchman died in Los Angeles on January 7, 2003.
