= Georg Büchmann =

German philologist (1822–1884)

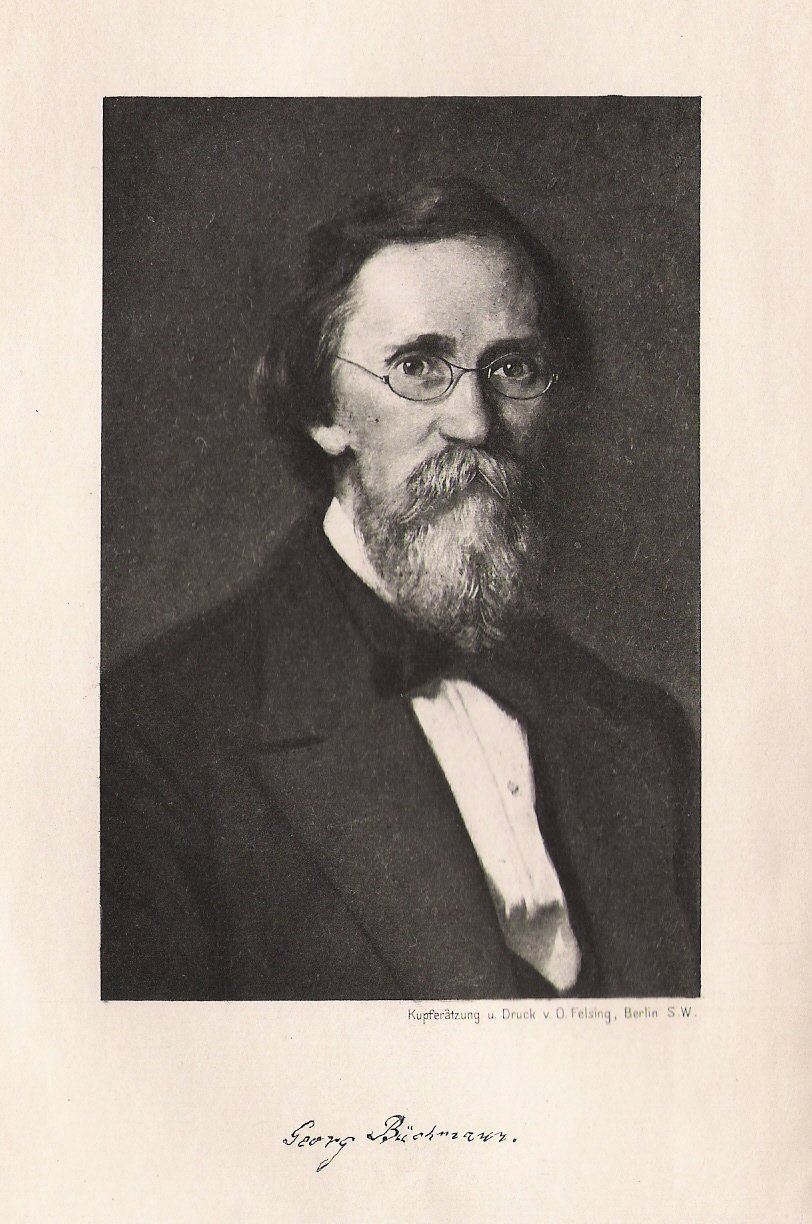
Georg Büchmann.

Georg Büchmann (German: [ˈbʏçman]; 4 January 1822 – 24 February 1884) was a German philologist. He was born in Berlin, and died there in Schöneberg.

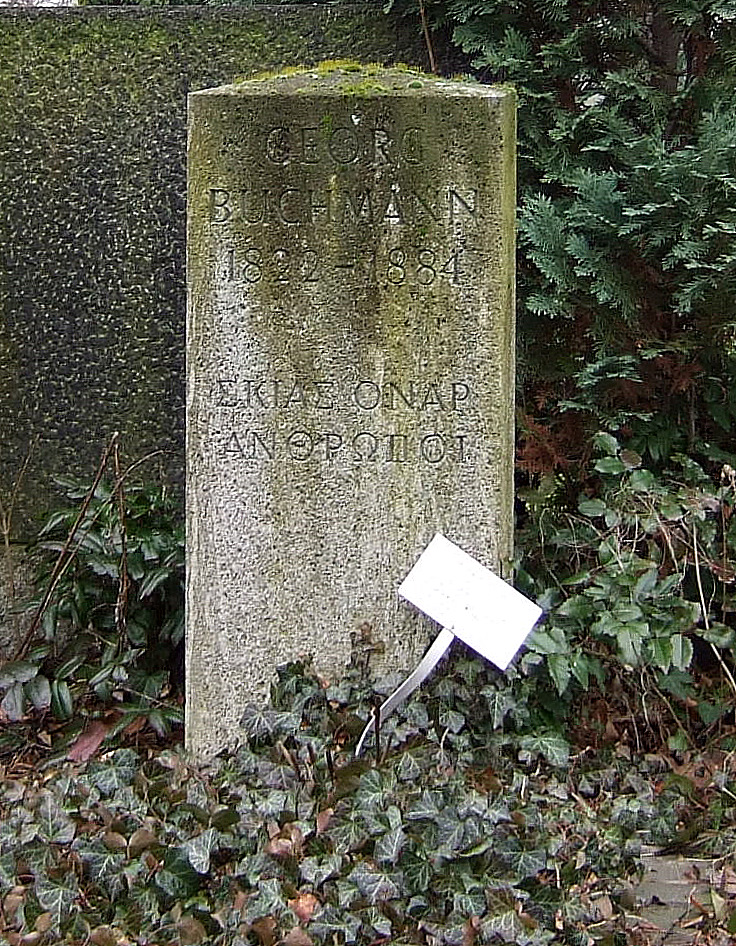
His grave in Berlin

He studied theology, philology and archaeology in University of Berlin, where his instructors included August Böckh and Theodor Panofka. He worked as a schoolteacher in Brandenburg an der Havel, and later taught language courses at the Friedrich-Werder'schen trade school in Berlin (1854–77). In 1872 he attained the title of professor.

He became well known as a result of his 1864 book Geflügelte Worte, Der Zitatenschatz des Deutschen Volkes, a collection of quotations. Specifically, the book (the title of which, loosely translated, is "Winged Words") included literary quotes that had become part of common speech. It went through numerous, expanded and revised editions (14th edition, Berlin, 1884) and has been translated into various foreign languages.
