= Ravenna Junior/Senior High School =

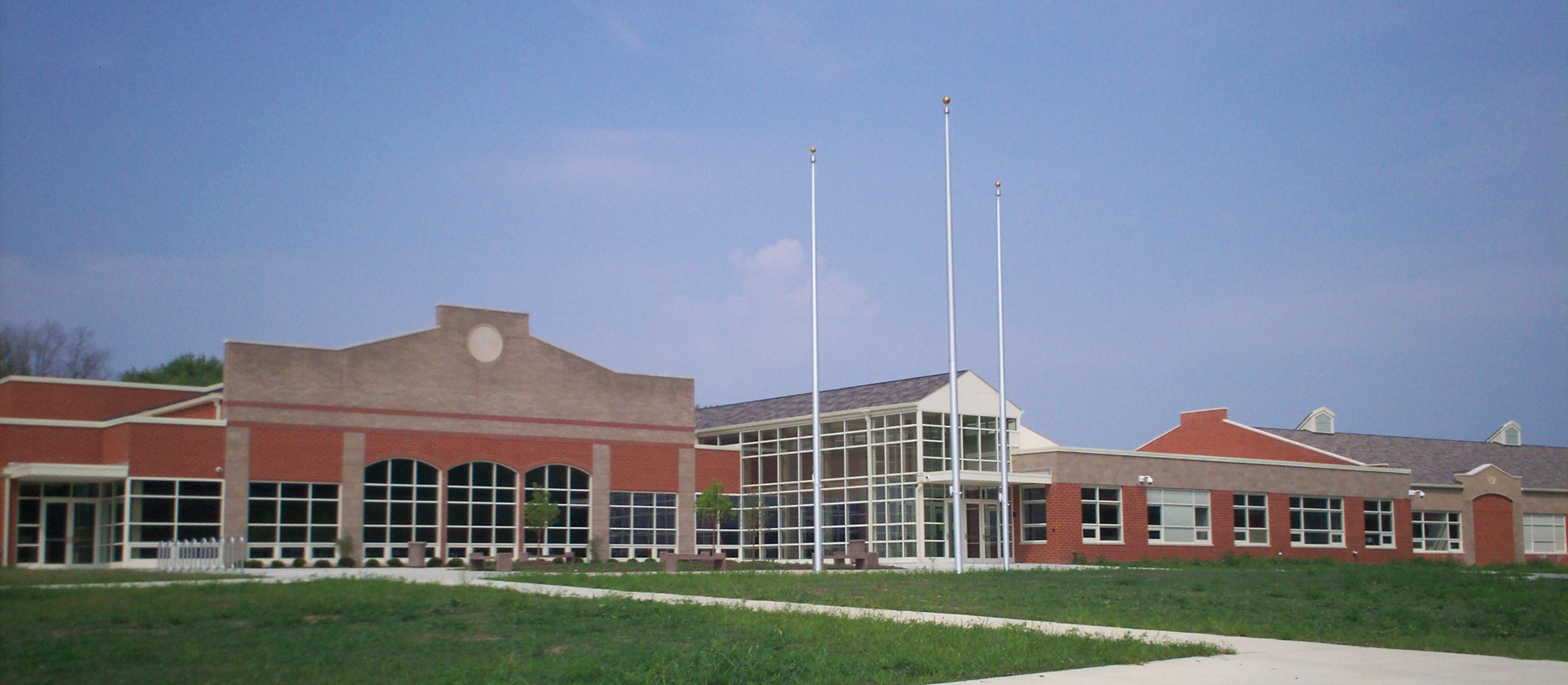

Location
- 6589 North Chestnut Street; Ravenna, Ohio 44266; United States; 41°10′14″N 81°14′48″W

Information
- Funding type: Public
- Founded: 1858
- School district: Ravenna School District
- NCES School ID: 390446801563
- Principal: Jonathan Lane
- Staff: 36.75 (FTE)
- Grades: 7–12
- Enrollment: 534 (2024–25) (Note: Enrollment is for grades 9–12. Total with grades 7 and 8 is 775)
- Student to teacher ratio: 14.53
- Language: English
- Campus: Suburban
- Colors: Blue, white, red
- Athletics conference: Metro Athletic Conference
- Team name: Ravens
- Rival: Kent Roosevelt Rough Riders
- Accreditation: Ohio Department of Education
- Newspaper: Ravenna High Times
- Yearbook: Tatler
- Communities served: Ravenna and Ravenna Township
- Website: www.ravennaschools.us

Ravenna Junior/Senior High School, previously known as Ravenna High School, is a public high school and junior high school located in Ravenna, Ohio, United States. It is the only high school and junior high in the Ravenna School District and serves students in grades 7–12 primarily in Ravenna and Ravenna Township. Athletic teams are known as the Ravens.

== History ==
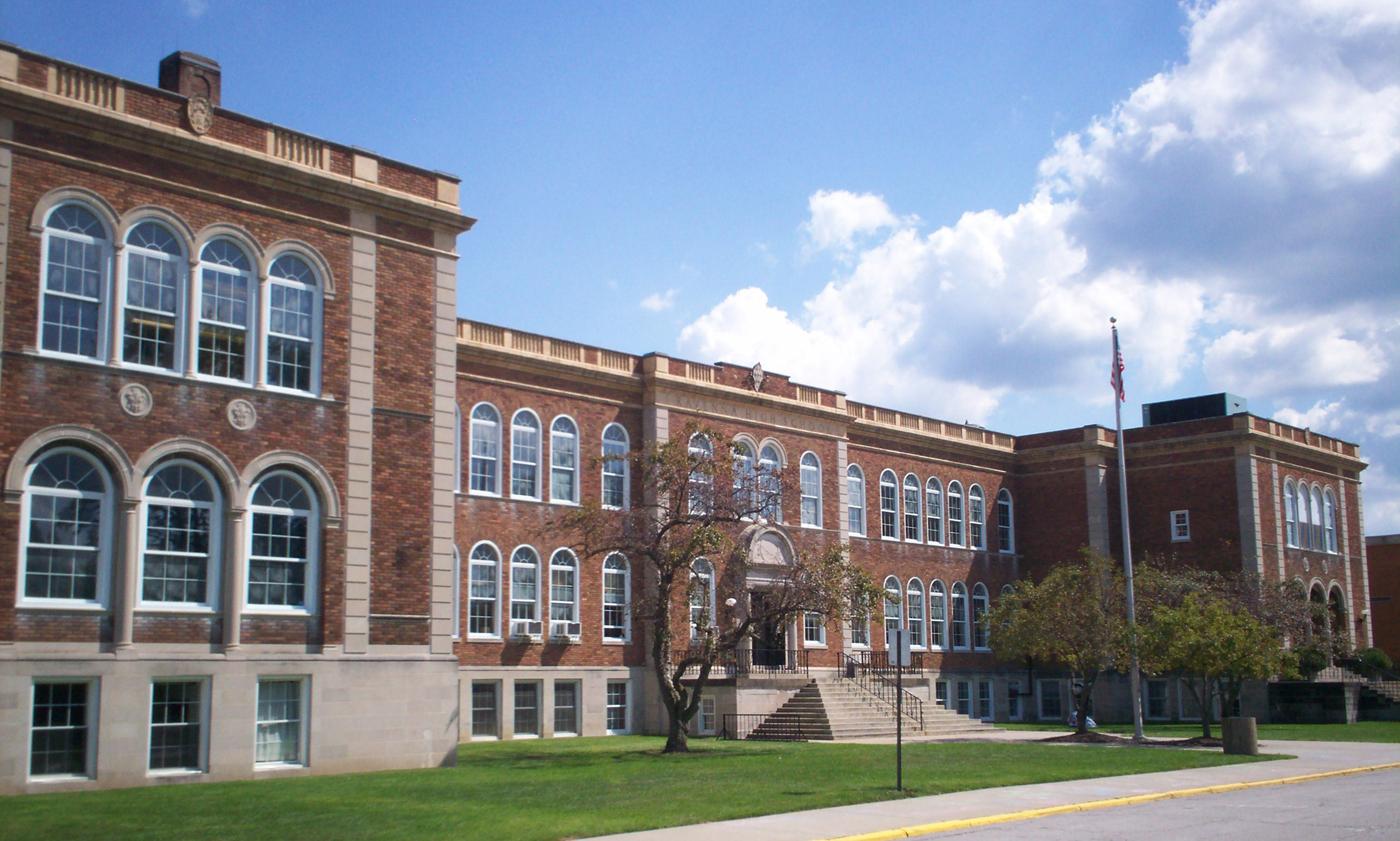
The previous home of Ravenna High School from 1923 to 2010. It was demolished in 2013.

Ravenna High School was established in 1858, first meeting in a grocery store along West Main Street before moving to the new Union School building on Chestnut Street after it opened in December 1859. The first graduating class from the school was in 1862 and included two students. The Union School building would serve as home to all grades in the Ravenna City Schools until enrollment growth necessitated the construction of a new high school building. The first building built exclusively for the high school, which stood on what is now Highland Avenue, opened in 1883 with an addition built in 1910. It served as the home of Ravenna High School until 1923. That building was later used as an elementary school called Highland Elementary until 1954, while the original 1883 portion was razed in 1955. The 1910 addition, often called Walnut School and used for a number of purposes over the years, was razed in 2025 after years of disuse.

The next home of Ravenna High School, located at the intersection of Clinton Street and East Main Street, opened in August 1923 after an August 1921 groundbreaking. It initially contained 28 classrooms, an auditorium, and a gymnasium. Additions were added to the building first in 1958–1959 with the Coll Annex on the north side and later in the late 1960s with Whittaker Hall on the south side of the building. In 1960, Ravenna Township High School merged with Ravenna High School. Prior to that time, Ravenna High School was often referred to as "Ravenna City High School" to distinguish it from the township school. As part of the merger, the Ravens team name was kept, while the school adopted the school colors of Ravenna Township, blue and white. Previously, Ravenna City had used blue and maroon as school colors.

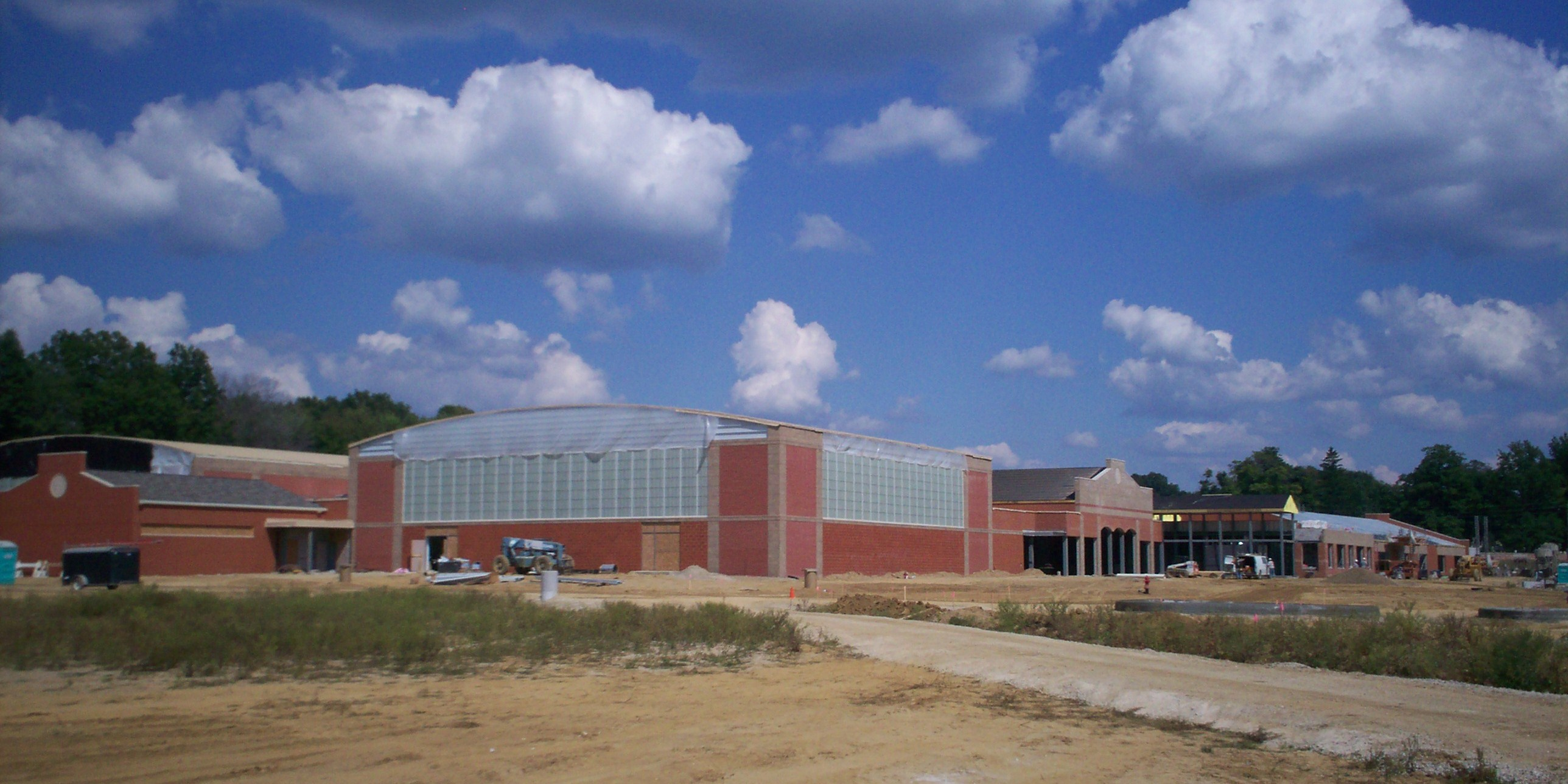
The new building under construction in September 2009 with the Coll Gymnasium in center.

Voters approved a bond issue in 2006 to fund construction of a new high school with assistance from the state of Ohio. The building was built adjacent to the district's existing athletic facilities on North Chestnut Street and was completed and dedicated in August 2010. The district carried two names from the old building to the new one as the school's main gym is named the "James L. Coll Gymnasium" while the field house gym is named the "James A. Whittaker Field House".

The previous school building at the corner of East Main and Clinton Streets was put up for sale in 2010. It was unsuccessfully auctioned off along with remaining contents inside in April 2011. Because the state funded a majority of the new high school project, the building it replaced had to be sold or demolished and could be used for a public school. On November 22, 2011, it was publicly announced following a board vote that the old high school would be demolished. Historic and nostalgic items from the school were removed with some being moved to the new high school. Asbestos removal and other interior preparation work took place during the middle part of 2012. Demolition of the old Ravenna High School began on October 16, 2012 and was completed in March 2013. A new center for higher education, named the Ravenna Learning Center, was planned for the site with a satellite campus of Stark State College as the anchor, but plans fell through in May 2015. It was sold to the city of Ravenna in 2022 for a planned city services complex, though as of December 2025, the site remains vacant.

As part of a reorganization plan in the Ravenna School District, seventh and eighth graders were moved to the high school beginning in August 2026, with third and fourth graders moved to the middle school. As a result, the Ravenna School Board renamed the high school to Ravenna Junior/Senior High School, while Brown Middle School was renamed Brown Intermediate School.

== Campus and facilities ==
The Ravenna High school building contains 158,000 square feet (14,700 m^{2}) of space and includes the main gym, auxiliary field house gym, auditorium, cafeteria, and around 45 classrooms. The main gym has retractable bleacher seating for 1,125 and the auditorium has seating for 600 with 300 additional retractable seats that can expand into space in the cafeteria. The field house gym includes a rubberized surface which has two full-size basketball courts and an elevated walking track. The building also has two courtyards that separate the three academic sections of the building which are used for natural lighting and can also be used for outdoor teaching space. The building was dedicated August 28, 2010.

The campus is 69 acres (28 ha) and located in northern Ravenna along North Chestnut Street. The district first purchased the land in 1973 but nothing was built at the site until 1999 when athletic facilities were constructed, funded mainly by private donations and the sale of personal seat licenses. Prior to that time, outdoor sports were held at the old Gilcrest Stadium and various locations throughout the area. The campus includes Portage Community Bank Stadium which has a seating capacity of 5,000 and features an eight-lane all-weather running track and artificial playing surface. The stadium, one of the first in Ohio to have FieldTurf, became one of the first in the country to have a non-traditional field color when blue turf was installed in 2013 instead of the traditional green. A baseball field, softball field, eight tennis courts, and a cross country course are also on campus.

== Athletics ==
=== State championships ===
- Boys golf – 1966
- Boys wrestling – 1993

==== Associated Press poll championships ====
- Girls basketball – 2011

== Notable alumni ==
- Bill Bower, class of 1934 - last surviving pilot of the Doolittle Raid
- David D. Busch, class of 1966 – best-selling author
- William R. Day, class of 1866 – associate justice of the Supreme Court of the United States, 1903–1922
- Calvin Hampton, class of 1956 – classical organist
- Al Hodge, class of 1930 – actor in films such as Captain Video and The Green Hornet and producer of The Lone Ranger radio program
- Robert B. "Yank" Heisler, class of 1966 – KeyBank chairman
- Peggy King, class of 1947 – pop singer and television personality
- Don Nottingham, class of 1967 – professional football player in the National Football League (NFL)
- Jeff West, class of 1971 – professional football player in the NFL
- Don M. Wilson III, class of 1966 – Chief Risk Officer at JP Morgan Chase Bank-Retired
