= Tim Place =

American football coach

Playing career
- c. 1989: Washington and Lee

Coaching career (HC unless noted)
- 1992–1995: Greene Central HS (NY) (assistant)
- 1996: Hartwick (assistant)
- 1997–1998: Eureka (assistant)
- 1999: Western Carolina (assistant)
- 2000–2001: Ravenna HS (OH)
- 2002–2005: Urbana (DC)
- 2006–2007: Urbana
- 2008–2019: Chowan

Head coaching record
- Overall: 58–84 (college)

Tim Place is an American football coach. He served as head football coach at Urbana University in Urbana, Ohio from 2006 to 2007 and Chowan University in Murfreesboro, North Carolina from 2008 to 2019. Place compiled a record of 11–11 in two seasons at Urbana.

== Head coaching record ==
=== College ===
Year	Team	Overall	Conference	Standing	Bowl/playoffs
Urbana Blue Knights (Mid-States Football Association) (2006–2007)
2006	Urbana	5–6	2–5	6th (MEL)	
2007	Urbana	6–5	3–4	5th (MEL)	
Urbana:		11–11	5–9		
Chowan Hawks (Central Intercollegiate Athletic Association) (2008–2019)
2008	Chowan	2–8	1–6	6th (Western)	
2009	Chowan	2–8	2–5	T–4th (Western)	
2010	Chowan	3–7	3–4	T–4th (Northern)	
2011	Chowan	3–7	2–5	T–5th (Northern)	
2012	Chowan	6–4	5–2	2nd (Northern)	
2013	Chowan	4–6	3–4	T–3rd (Northern)	
2014	Chowan	2–8	1–6	T–5th (Northern)	
2015	Chowan	6–4	4–3	T–2nd (Northern)	
2016	Chowan	6–4	4–3	T–3rd (Northern)	
2017	Chowan	4–6	4–3	4th (Northern)	
2018	Chowan	6–4	4–2	3rd (Northern)	
2019	Chowan	3–7	2–5	T–4th (Northern)	
Chowan:		47–73	35–48		
Total:		58–84			
