= Computer Press Association =

Association to promote excellence in computer journalism

Founded in 1983, the Computer Press Association (CPA) was established to promote excellence in the field of computer journalism. The association was composed of working editors, writers, producers, and freelancers who covered issues related to computers and technology. The CPA conducted the annual Computer Press Awards, which was the preeminent editorial awards of the computer and technology media. The CPA Awards honored outstanding examples in print, broadcast and electronic media. Awards were given for print publications, such as PC Magazine; online news media, such as Newsbytes News Network (both were multiple winners); individual columns and features by well-known journalists such as Steven Levy (author of “Hackers: Heroes of the Computer Revolution”); broadcast awards such as “Best Radio Program”; as well as book awards in categories such as Best Product Specific Book. CPA President Jeff Yablon (1994-1996) developed an updated code of ethics for technology journalists that was adopted by many major trade show groups, most notably Bruno Blenheim. The Computer Press Association disbanded in 2000.

- Individuals winning multiple Computer Press Association awards include:
  - Wendy Woods Gorski (3 times)
  - John C. Dvorak (8 times)
  - Woody Leonhard (8 times)
  - Deke McClelland (7 times)
  - Brock N. Meeks (4 times)
  - Ed Bott (3 times)
  - Danny Goodman (3 times)
  - Linda Rohrbough (3 times)
  - Mary McFall Axelson (2 times)
  - David D. Busch (2 times)
  - Jonathan Littman (2 times)
  - David Pogue (2 times)
  - Ed Scannell (2 times)
  - Neil J. Salkind (2 times)
