= Paper computer =

Paper computer may refer to:

- Papanek paper computer (Bisociation tool), a paper computer by Victor Papanek for design work
- WDR paper computer, an educational register machine computer constructed of paper
- PaperWindows, a bendable electronic paper computer by the Human Media Lab
  - Electronic paper
  - Flexible display
  - Digital paper
- Ace of Aces (picture book game)

== See also ==
- The Computer Paper, a Canadian computer magazine
- Computer paper, continuous form paper for use with dot-matrix and line printers
- Calculator paper, paper rolls used by printing electronic calculators
