= Impos/2 =

Raster graphics editor

- Impos/2 version 2.1 running in eComStation
- Developer: Compart Systemhaus GmbH
- Initial release: 1993; 32 years ago
- Platform: OS/2
- Type: Raster graphics editor
- License: Proprietary software

Impos/2 is a raster graphics editor for OS/2 developed by Compart Systemhaus GmbH. It was the first 32-bit graphics editor developed to run natively on OS/2. Originally a German application, it was later localized for English-speaking territories and redistributed in the United States by Indelible Blue Inc.

== Features ==
Impos/2 provides a full suite of image editing tools, including basic functions like freehand drawing and cropping, as well as more advanced effects such as airbrushing, sharpening, embossing, edge detection, mosaic effects, color correction, noise reduction, magic-wand selection, color gradients, warping, and cloning. Impos/2 is fully multithreaded, allowing users to continue to work on one file while the program simultaneously handles CPU-intensive background tasks, such as loading another file or applying a filter. Impos/2 supports working in various color depths—from 1-bit monochrome to 24-bit true color—and importing and exporting various file formats, including GIF, PCX, BMP, TIFF, JPEG, TGA, and PNM, among others. Impos/2 also includes an interpreter for Rexx, allowing users to develop advanced macros for repeated actions and batch processing of files.

In scanning mode, Impos/2 offers several prescan features for working with flatbed scanners, such as selecting the area of the image to be scanned. The software includes drivers for interfacing with over 20 different models of scanners. The program also facilitates various types of screen captures within OS/2.

== Development ==
Impos/2 was developed by Compart Systemhaus GmbH, a software development company based in Böblingen, Germany. Version 1.0 of the program was released in Germany in 1993. It was the first 32-bit graphics editor developed to run natively on OS/2. (Note: Some 16-bit code is used for reading Kodak Photo CDs.) Unlike many raster graphics editors available at the time, Impos/2's GUI is a single-document interface, with its various windows floating around on the desktop independent of each other, intentionally eschewing a multiple-document interface (as in early versions of Photoshop). Version 1.2 for OS/2 Warp was released in late 1994; this was the first version of Impos/2 to be localized in English and distributed in English-speaking territories in Europe as well as the United States. In the latter country, the program was redistributed by Indelible Blue Inc., a publisher of OS/2 software. Version 2.0, released in summer 1996, brought support for Hewlett-Packard's ScanJet line of scanners and added various filters and circular and magic-wand selection. A minor revision, version 2.01 for OS/2 Warp 4, followed in late 1996. The final version of Impos/2, version 2.1, was released in 1998, although Compart continued releasing drivers for newer SCSI-based scanners into at least 2001.

== Reception ==
Because of the relative unpopularity of the OS/2 operating system, Impos/2 suffered from low adoption. Personal Computer World's Chris Bidmead wrote that "Impos/2 is a modest but subtle bitmap manipulation package ... hardly going to make a dent in the sales of Windows products like Picture Publisher, but for OS/2 users it's fully 32-bit". Jeff Hildebrand, writing in The Computer Paper, compared the program to Dr. Halo, finding Impos/2 far more stable and responsive ("It's no contest") but deeming the icon-based SDI less intuitive. Esther Schindler of PC Magazine called the program a jack of all trades, writing further that, "[w]ith some experience ... Impos/2 begins to feel like a favorite pocketknife: It might not be the most powerful tool, but it's the one you reach first". OS/2 VOICE's Manfred Agne wrote that, by 2001, "ImpOS/2 looks a bit outdated" when compared to contemporary OS/2 software like Dadaware's Embellish and GIMP but found the Rexx interpreter extremely powerful and unique among image editors.
