= Newsbytes News Network =

Tech news outlet

Newsbytes News Network, called "an Associated Press for tech-information junkies" was founded in May, 1983 in San Francisco, California by broadcast journalist Wendy Woods Gorski, who remained editor in chief for the 19 years. Continually published from 1983 to 2002, Newsbytes covered breaking news in consumer technology including computing, interactive media, telecommunications and cybersecurity, spanning the formative years of Silicon Valley and the advent of personal computers.

The Washington Post Company acquired Newsbytes in 1997. The archive of Newsbytes stories is currently on the Lexis-Nexis research database under the code NWSBYT

Predating the Internet, Newsbytes News Network came to be considered a “boot camp“ for online journalism. Its alumni have gone on to work for CNet, ZDNet, The Wall Street Journal, Reuters, and The New York Times.

At the height of its popularity in the mid-1990s, Newsbytes was published by over 180 media outlets and produced almost 100 technology news reports daily. Its success was buoyed by enthusiasm for news about emerging technologies. Newsbytes was able to offer instantaneous delivery of technology information before the invention of the Internet.

== History ==
Wendy Woods Gorski had the idea to create an online publication out of what she was already writing daily for her broadcast news position in San Francisco. As a reporter and editor working under the name "Wendy Woods," she compiled news leads for her assignment editors at CNN (San Francisco Bureau) and KGO-TV (ABC) in 1982 and realized these news story ideas could be of interest to the general public. These summaries included contact information for the sources.

Newsbytes officially launched in 1983 as a "user publishing" feature on an online service called The Source, owned by Reader’s Digest, based in McLean, Virginia. "Newsbytes", began to earn royalties and an audience.

In its first few years, the weekly stories were written with a style that reflected television writing: succinct stories with an irreverent flair. "(Newsbytes) reflected her personality. It was, in some ways, the very first blog. It was infused with her being and when I joined her in 1985 I took that lesson to heart, putting my personality into my own work from Atlanta", said Dana Blankenhorn, one of the service’s early writers.

By the end of the first year Steve Gold, a journalist in Sheffield, England, joined the company and contributed European technology news. Gradually the service evolved from summaries to fleshed-out stories and included the work of multiple reporters in different US cities and countries.

Newsbytes stories were aimed at a broad cross-section of both business and consumer users of information technology, which contributed to the service’s wide appeal. Newsbytes was advertiser-free which gave it the added advantage of public trust and objectivity in a niche industry.

During its nearly two decades of existence, Newsbytes News Network stories were syndicated to some 180 magazines, newspapers, newsletters, and online services worldwide. Among the largest online services were Compuserve, America Online, BIX, ZiffNet, The Information Access Co., Dow Jones News/Retrieval, PointCast, and other information providers located in the United States, Europe, Asia, Africa and Australia. A Toronto-based company called Clarinet prepared the wire feed for Unix systems that went directly to corporate information technologists. Weekly estimated readership reached 4.5 million.

In 1987, Wendy Woods Gorski teamed with Peter P. Vekinis, an entrepreneur at the time. Peter originated the Workwriter computer package, was owner of the Technology Channel, creator of the Picosat satellite system, and designer of a C language compiler for the Amstrad 6128personal computer system.

Peter and Wendy designed the content-specific format, created "push news" to clients (an unknown feature at the time). Peter devised a system where news would be delivered to the clients' remote printers, connected via modem so that breaking news would be delivered instantly.

The company also expanded distribution to CD-ROM subscriptions and email subscriptions. Nels Johnson, a San Francisco-based programmer, created software that allowed PC owners to process the news feed offline and display headlines or full stories. Wendy also created a weekly TV newscast for The Computer Show at a San Jose television channel. Woods also continued to be a correspondent for Computer Chronicles, a PBS program, from 1984-1990.

Peter left Newsbytes in 1990 to pursue other interests and sold his share of the company to Steve Gold, an early Newsbytes contributor and co-owner.

== Move to Minnesota ==
Wendy and husband Nick Gorski moved the company headquarters and family to Stillwater, Minnesota in the Minneapolis/St. Paul area in 1993. Newsbytes was operated out of the carriage house behind their Victorian home at 406 West Olive Street from 1993 through 2002.

In the mid-90s, Steve Laliberte, also living in Minnesota and the former director of McGraw-Hill’s competing BIX service, became a Newsbytes co-owner. He created Newsbytes News Network’s website, on the emerging Internet to make subscriptions available to the general public. Innovations included 15-minute delayed quotes for the stock price of publicly held companies via links in the stories, complete keyword search of archives, and additional news feeds from The Business Wire.

== Business Model ==
Newsbytes News Network’s financial success stemmed from events made possible by the computer revolution itself. Advantages over traditional print media were electronic distribution (no print costs), the speed of distribution (instantaneous), and a decentralized newsroom of correspondents who worked from their home offices worldwide. The company’s business model consisted of licensing the news stream, media partnerships (Ziff-Davis Publishing, McGraw Hill, USA Today, Dow Jones News and Retrieval, Reuters, America Online, Compuserve, Newsnet, Dialog, and Applelink), and online downloads. Through multiple media and channels, Newsbytes was distributed to a wide variety of media outlets. Newsbytes became an LLC in 1996

== Sale to the Washington Post ==
In 1997, Newsbytes News Network LLC was sold by partners Wendy Woods Gorski (editor-in-chief), Steve Gold (UK bureau chief), Joshua Schneck (marketing director) and Steve Laliberte (technology director) to The Washington Post Company for an undisclosed fee. Wendy served as editor-in-chief of the publication at the Washington Post Company's Post-Newsweek Interactive division until the company discontinued the news service for financial reasons on May 31, 2002, just one year before its 20-year anniversary. At the time, the Post said the closure was due to having too many websites. "We currently publish two technology Web sites for the Washington Post Company and we are consolidating our online tech coverage," said Washtech/Newsbytes Publisher Valerie Voci at the time.

Wendy said of the closure at the time that Newsbytes "was a long fun ride. I would like to think that we made a bit of the same history that we were writing about."

The 150,000-plus news story archive is still available on the Lexis-Nexis database service.

== Awards ==
Newsbytes coverage won the 1994 Dvorak Award for Outstanding Online News Service and won five annual Best Online Publication awards from the Computer Press Association in the 1980s and 1990s.
