= Don Nottingham =

American football player (born 1949)

No. 48, 36
- Position: Running back

Personal information
- Born: June 26, 1949 (age 77); Widen, West Virginia, U.S.
- Listed height: 5 ft 10 in (1.78 m)
- Listed weight: 210 lb (95 kg)

Career information
- High school: Windham school system Windham Ohio Ravenna (Ravenna, Ohio)
- College: Kent State
- NFL draft: 1971: 17th round, 441st overall pick

Career history
- Baltimore Colts (1971–1973); Miami Dolphins (1973–1977)

Career NFL statistics
- Rushing attempts: 611
- Rushing yards: 2,496
- Rushing touchdowns: 34
- Stats at Pro Football Reference

Donald Ray Nottingham (born June 26, 1949) is an American former professional football player who was a running back for the Baltimore Colts and Miami Dolphins of the National Football League (NFL). He was affectionately referred to as "the Human Bowling Ball" because of his short but robust frame. He played college football for the Kent State Golden Flashes.

== Early career and college ==
Don Nottingham first attended Windham school system in Windham Ohio then to Ravenna High School in Ravenna, Ohio, and played college football at nearby Kent State University. He was a three-year letterman, and captained the team his senior year. He finished his college career with 2,515 yards on 602 carries. He also made the first-team All-Mid-American Conference teams in 1969 and 1970. Nottingham's Golden Flashes teammates included future head coaches Gary Pinkel (Toledo, Missouri) and Nick Saban (Toledo, Michigan State, LSU, Alabama).

== Professional career ==
Nottingham was selected in the 17th round of the 1971 NFL draft by the Baltimore Colts, the second to last pick of the draft. He spent two full years in Baltimore before being traded midway through the 1973 NFL season to the Don Shula-led Miami Dolphins.

His Colts teammate, linebacker Mike Curtis, jokingly recalled of "the Human Bowling Ball" that he was "the guy who runs so low to the ground that the only way to bring him down is to hit him low — around the neck."

Nottingham was part of the Dolphins team that won Super Bowl VIII over the Minnesota Vikings 24–7. He gained the starting role after Larry Csonka left for the World Football League in 1975 and finished in the top ten of all running backs for rushing touchdowns during the 1974 and 1975 NFL seasons.

Nottingham broke his left shoulder blade in August 1978 and sat out the entire 1978 season on injured reserve, then retired in March 1979 to sell insurance. He finished his career with 2,496 yards and 34 touchdowns on 611 carries, as well as 67 catches for 502 yards.

== Career statistics ==
=== Regular season ===
			Rushing				Receiving
Season	Team	League	GP	Att	Yds	TD	Rec	Yds	TD
1971	Baltimore	NFL	14	95	388	5	15	88	0
1972	Baltimore	NFL	14	123	466	3	25	191	0
1973	Bal/Mia	NFL	14	52	252	1	3	26	0
1974	Miami	NFL	14	66	273	8	3	40	0
1975	Miami	NFL	14	168	718	12	9	66	0
1976	Miami	NFL	14	63	185	3	4	33	0
1977	Miami	NFL	14	44	214	2	8	58	0
Regular season totals			98	611	2496	34	67	502	0
