= McDonald & Co. =

U.S. investment firm

- Type: Public
- Traded as: NYSE: MDD
- Industry: Financial services
- Founded: 1924
- Founders: Bert McDonald; James Callahan
- Defunct: 2007
- Fate: Sold to UBS AG
- Successor: UBS AG
- Headquarters: McDonald Investment Center, Cleveland, Ohio, United States
- Area served: Upper Midwest

McDonald & Co. was a full-service investment firm based in Cleveland, Ohio, established in 1927. Internally, it was referred to as "McD" (mick-D). It was sold to hometown bank KeyCorp in 1998, but was eventually sold to the U.S. investment arm of Swiss banking giant UBS AG in 2007.

== History ==
It was formed in 1924 by Charles Bert "Bert" McDonald and James Callahan, who borrowed $50,000 to buy the Geo. W. York Co. The pair would rename the firm McDonald & Callahan. The firm would use several more names before settling on McDonald & Co. in 1944. In 1964, McD bought Field, Richards & Co.

McD was organized as a partnership until it went public on July 20, 1983. The IPO increased McD's capital from $6 million to $24 million, with 80% of the stock held by the former partners of the partnership.

In December 1990, McD acquired S. J. Wolfe & Co., a stock brokerage firm and an over-the-counter trading operation.

At the time of KeyCorp merger, McD was the leader in merger transactions in the Midwest during the past two years, according to the American Banker trade newspaper. It also had nearly 700 retail brokers, 160 investment bankers, and about 260 specialists in capital markets.

At the same time as the KeyCorp merger, McD was making a couple acquisitions of its own. In September 1998, McD completed the purchase of Rochester, New York–based brokerage firm Essex Capital Markets Inc. Essex had 55 brokers and 4 offices in Buffalo, Syracuse, Lockport, and Jamestown. It was also attempting to buy Raleigh, North Carolina–based full-service investment banking firm Trident Securities Inc. Accordingly, Key would buy Trident in a stock deal in April 1999 and it would be operated as a separate division of McD.

On January 1, 2001, McD bought The Wallach Company, a Denver, Colorado–based investment banking firm.

However, the firm began to decline in the waning years under KeyCorp. As such, a number of top brokers bolted the firm in the final 3 years before the UBS deal.

The attrition of brokers and assets was particularly harsh in 2005. In February, Todd and Donn Carmel, the sons of the former CEO Bill Carmel, also left the firm for Smith Barney (now known as Morgan Stanley Smith Barney). In March, Trident would be shuttered, according to the News & Observer (Raleigh, North Carolina). But the biggest blow was in April of that year, when superstars David Knall and Jeff Cohen took their 30-person team and roughly $3.5 billion in assets to rival Stifel Nicolaus. However, Mr. Knall was not without his own cloud of controversy. The U.S. Securities and Exchange Commission charged that he was involved in insider trading. Knall would settle with the SEC in December 2007 in exchange for a one-year suspension and agreed to pay $123,865 in fines and restitution. Nonetheless, as a result of the Knall group's departure in 2005, McD was forced to cut a deal with Stifel to dispose of a costly lease for the northside Indianapolis offices Knall had occupied. In November 2005, the Don and Howard Kaplan team and Scott Litwin in Cincinnati also moved to Stifel.

Another blow was the loss of the Bosart Group, which was based in the affluent Detroit suburb of Birmingham, Michigan, to Wachovia Securities (now known as Wells Fargo Advisors) in December 2005. The patriarch, Eugene H. "Trip" Bosart III, was not only a big producer, but also served on the board of directors of McD when it was independent firm. The loss of Bosarts was demoralizing.

Additionally, more brokers fled between the announcement and consummation of the UBS deal, including seven sizable Gradison producers in Cincinnati.

== Names ==
- McDonald & Callahan, McDonald & Company Investment Inc., McDonald Investments, McDonald Financial Group, Gradison McDonald Investments
- Gradison McDonald was used in the greater Cincinnati area. The Gradison name, which lasted for 80 years, was acquired in October 1991 for $22.63 million.
- Gradison & Co. was founded in 1925.
- In 2004, KeyCorp management decided to rebrand McD as "McDonald Financial Group," creating a functional unit (but a not legal entity) by combining KeyCorp's trust department and private banking with the brokerage operations.

== Business ==
McD operated a regional investment banking and securities brokerage business. It engaged in such activities as the origination, underwriting, distribution, trading and brokerage of fixed income and equity securities, and investment advisory and investment services.

Since 1991, the principal offices were located at 800 Superior Avenue in downtown Cleveland, known as the McDonald Investment Center. It operated in the northern United States, as well as Canada, United Kingdom and the Far East. The retail brokerage or private clients (individual customers) were primarily located in Ohio, Michigan, Indiana, and western New York.

In 1998, its last year as a stand-alone firm, commission and fees accounted for 40% revenues, investment income was 31%, trading income was 18%, and all other income was 11%.

== Management ==
Willard E. "Bill" Carmel was a partner at McD since 1968. He was the corporate secretary from June 7, 1983, to July 23, 1984, and was the firm's president from July 23, 1984, to April 1, 1989. He would later become managing partner from 1989 to 1990 as well as CEO from April 1, 1989, to January 1, 1994. Eventually, Carmel would be chairman of the board from April 1, 1989, to August 1, 1995.

Thomas M. McDonald ran the Private Client Group from June 1, 1997, until roughly 2003. He left to become the president and CEO of Wayne Hummer Investments in Chicago.

At the time of the KeyCorp merger, the chairman of the board of directors was Thomas M. O'Donnell, president and chief executive officer was William B. "Bill" Summers Jr., treasurer was Robert T. Clutterbuck, secretary was Thomas F. Mc Kee. Bill Summers became CEO since January 1, 1994. He began with the firm in 1971 as an intern.

Shortly after the merger, O'Donnell would retire and Summers would gain the chairman's title along with CEO. Summers would retain both titles for more than a year after the merger, and Clutterbuck would become president in 1998. Affectionately known as "Clutter" by friends and colleagues, Clutterbuck was an effective, hands-on manager, who also began with the firm as an intern on the muni bond desk within fixed income while he was in college. He joined the firm in June 1974 and in April 1977 was named the second youngest partner in firm history. Later, Summers would pass the CEO mantle to Clutterbuck in 2000 but would remain chairman. Although very popular with the rank and file, Clutterbuck's constant battles with the bank to preserve the McD culture made him no friends in Key Tower. Moreover, Clutterbuck refused to forgo his minimum annual bonus for 2001, despite the decision by the rest of Key's senior management to forsake bonuses following a difficult operating year. Thus, Clutterbuck received $1.289 million bonus pursuant to employment agreement signed as part of the merger, according to KeyCorp's 2002 proxy statement. This led to his quick demise.

Yet, since Clutterbuck's employment agreement extended until December 31, 2004, and it stipulated that he serve as the chairman and chief executive officer of Key Capital Partners and the chief executive officer of McDonald Investments Inc., Key needed a way to mollify him. In August 2002, Clutterbuck would get the newly created vice chairman moniker and transitioned the CEO title to Robert G. Jones, a lifelong banker. However, buried within the details as a subtle shift in control. Jones would report to KeyCorp Chairman and CEO Henry Meyer instead of Summers, who was still the Chairman of McD.

Yet, Jones surprised and impressed many McD employees in his brief two years as CEO. For instance, Jones spent considerable time learning the brokerage business and resisted major changes, particularly those that would rankle retail brokers. In the end, the well-regarded Jones was stuck in underfunded unit and had limited career upside at parent KeyCorp. Jones would eventually leave in September 2004 to become president and CEO of Old National Bank in Evansville, Indiana.

It took roughly three months before Key would tap Robert B. "Yank" Heisler Jr., a long-time Key banker, to replace Jones as CEO. In fact, Heisler would retain the title of chairman of KeyBank N.A. Both the delay in naming a replacement and the fact Heisler keeping his primary office down the street at Key Tower were harbingers of what would become of McD. He would be the last CEO of McD. Near that time, Salvatore A. "Sam" Messina, one of the principals of Essex, became the head of the Private Client Group.

Summers would remain as chairman until 2006.

=== Other executives ===
- Daniel F. Austin – was vice chairman, ran corporate and public finance – now outside director for Chess Financial Corp.
- Brian Brennan – was national sales manager for fixed income, former NFL player – now managing director debt capital markets for fixed income with KeyBank
- Thomas G. Clevidence – was director of human resources – director of human resources at Olympic Steel
- Robert Clutterbuck – was CEO – now owner at The Clutterbuck Funds, a hedge fund
- Paul H. Carleton – was managing director in charge of investment banking in the 1980s – founded Carleton, McCreary, Holmes & Co., where he held the title of senior managing director, a position he maintained through the firm's acquisition by KeyCorp in 1996. Currently, managing partner of Carleton McKenna & Company
- Ralph Della Ratta Jr. – ran investment banking – founded Western Reserve Partners
- Leonard J. DeRoma - Member of the Board of Directors and ran taxable fixed income pre- and post-acquisition by KeyBank. Had long Wall Street career running fixed income, securities finance, derivatives, and foreign exchange for large Wall Street firms. Hired to shore up McDonald management in upcoming merger. Currently founding partner and CFO of Invictus Group LLC
- Gerry Fallon - ran fixed income at KeyBank. After merger he ran derivatives, foreign exchange, and Treasury
- Mark A. Filippell – ran mergers & acquisitions department – now with Western Reserve Partners
- Patricia J. Jamieson – was CFO – now divisional CFO within KeyCorp for Key Commercial and Investment Bank, and National Consumer Finance
- Robert G. Jones – was CEO – now CEO of Old National Bank
- Thomas M. McDonald – president of the Private Client Group – founder of Thomas McDonald Partners
- Richard J. Nash – was chief market strategist – now portfolio manager with MAI Wealth Advisors
- Jack McGinty – was trader, Since 1950
- John O'Brien Jr. – was trader – now is senior vice president trader with MKM Partners
- James C. Redinger -ran the institutional equity division. Was employed by McDonald in 1971.
- Robert J. Stalla, Ph.D., CFA – was economist – created Stalla CFA Review Courses for Chartered Financial Analyst (CFA)exam, now a consultant with Becker Professional Educational
- Bradley E. Turner – was portfolio manager; started Portfolio Strategies Department – now chief investment officer for Chess Financial Corp.
- Nancy C. Benacci, CFA – was equity research analyst, insurance industry – now director of equity research, managing director at KeyBanc Capital Markets
- Rich Comstock – senior vice president; manager of retail fixed-income trading; manager of BusinessLink services – now SVP, financial advisor & portfolio manager with Stifel
