= Bill Bower =

U.S. Air Force colonel (1917–2011)

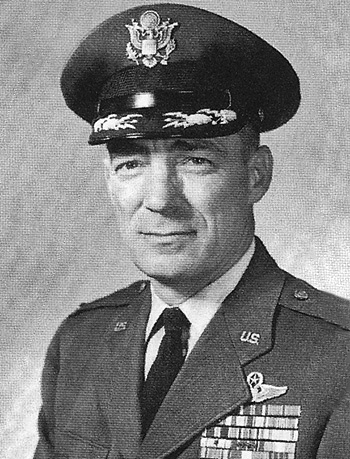
- Colonel William Marsh Bower
- Born: William Marsh Bower; February 13, 1917; Ravenna, Ohio, U.S.
- Died: January 10, 2011 (aged 93); Boulder, Colorado, U.S.
- Burial place: Arlington National Cemetery
- Military career
- Allegiance: United States
- Branch: United States Army Air Corps; United States Army Air Forces; United States Air Force
- Service years: 1940–1966
- Rank: Colonel
- Nickname: Bill
- Commands: 428th Bombardment Squadron; Dobbins Air Force Base
- Conflicts: World War II: Doolittle Raid
- Awards: Distinguished Flying Cross; Bronze Star Medal; Air Medals (2)

William Marsh Bower (February 13, 1917 – January 10, 2011) was an American aviator, U.S. Air Force Colonel and veteran of World War II. Bower was the last surviving pilot (e.g., aircraft commander) of the Doolittle Raid, the first air raid to target the Japanese home island of Honshu.

== Biography ==
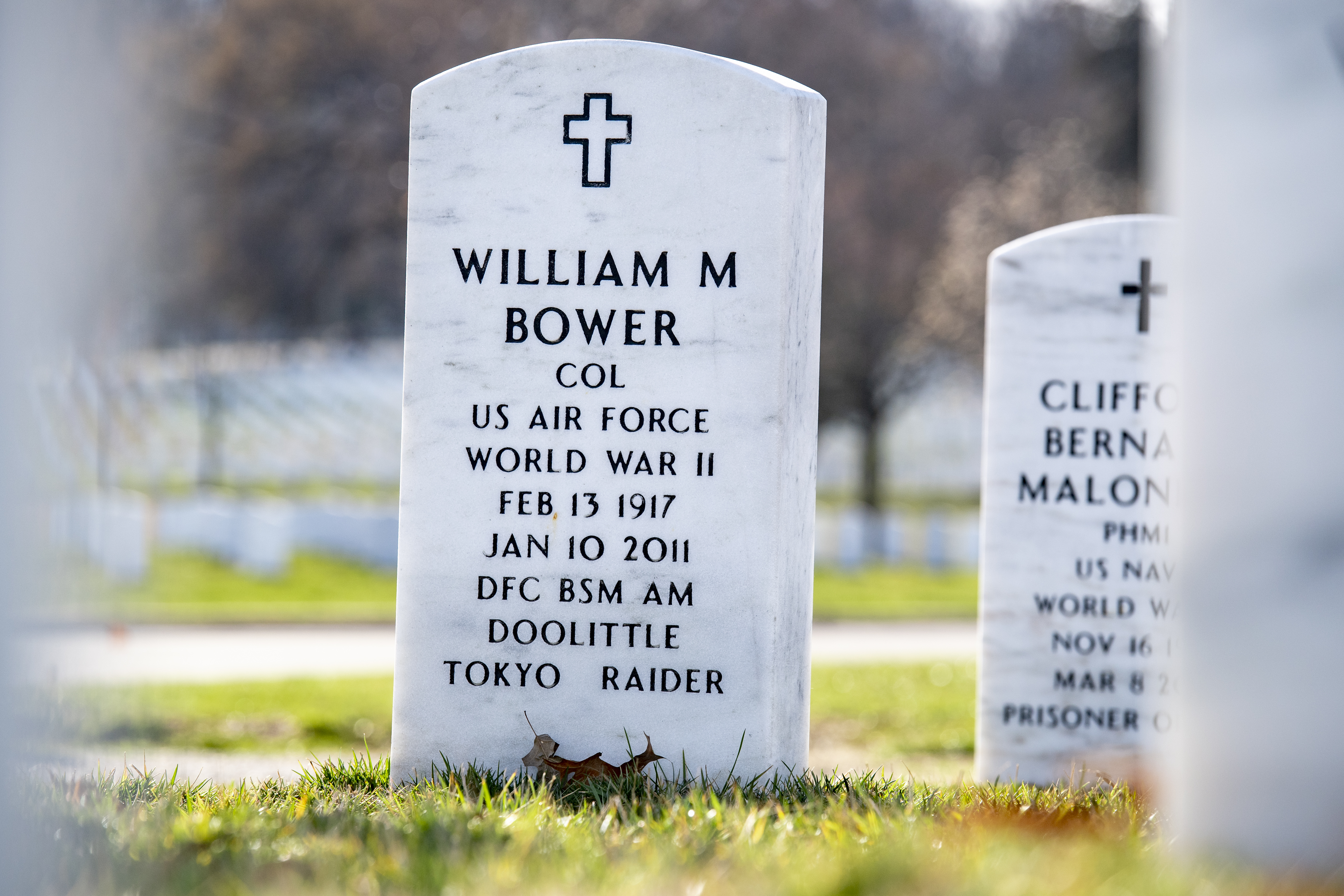
Grave at Arlington National Cemetery

A native of Ravenna, Ohio, Bower graduated from Ravenna High School in 1934. He attended Hiram College and Kent State University from 1934 until 1936. Bower then joined the Ohio National Guard's 107th Cavalry, based in Ravenna, from 1936 to 1938.

In 1940, Bower graduated from the U.S. Army Air Corps Flying School and was commissioned a second lieutenant in the U.S. Army Air Corps on October 4, 1940, with a rating of Army Aviator. In October 1940, Bower joined the 37th Bomb Squadron, based at Lowry Field in Denver, Colorado. He then transferred to the 17th Bombardment Group, headquartered at McChord Field, Washington, in June 1941.

In the months following the Japanese attack on Pearl Harbor, Bower volunteered for the first American aerial attack on Japan. The air raid, which came to be called the Doolittle Raid, after Lieutenant Colonel James "Jimmy" Doolittle, took place on April 18, 1942. Bower piloted one of the sixteen B-25B Mitchell medium bombers that took off from the USS Hornet to attack cities on Honshu.

Bower and his five-member crew bombed the city of Yokohama during the raid. They parachuted out of their B-25 over China during the night, which was his first jump from an airplane. They were taken in by Chinese villagers until rescue by the Americans. His mother, Kathryn Bower, was informed by Lt. Colonel Jimmy Doolittle that Bower had survived the attack approximately one month later. Eleven members of the Doolittle Raid were killed or captured. Bower and the other crew members were brought from China back to United States.

In June 1942, Bower and twenty-two other participants in the Doolittle Raid received the Distinguished Flying Cross during a reception held at the White House. The city of Ravenna declared July 3, 1942, as "Bill Bower Day." Bower married his wife, Lorraine (nee) Amman, in the lobby of the Lady Lafayette Hotel in Walterboro, South Carolina, on August 18, 1942. The couple had two sons and two daughters during their marriage.

Bower remained in the U.S. Army Air Forces throughout World War II, achieving the rank of colonel. He commanded the 428th Bombardment Squadron during the war and served in Africa, including the allied invasion of North Africa, and the European Theater, including Italy, until September 1945. He became an accident investigator following the end of World War II and transferred to the newly established U.S. Air Force in 1947. He also served as a commander of a U.S. Air Force transport organization in the Arctic and commanded Dobbins Air Force Base in Marietta, Georgia. He was awarded the Bronze Star Medal and two Air Medals during his career.

He moved to Boulder, Colorado, in 1966 with his wife and their four children. He lived in south Boulder, in the upper Table Mesa neighborhood, until his death on January 10, 2011, at the age of 93, after suffering from complications from a fall in June 2009. He was survived by two sons, two daughters and six grandchildren. His wife, Lorraine, predeceased him in 2004. He and his wife Lorraine are buried at Arlington National Cemetery.

The Colonel William Marsh Bower Center opened in the Portage County Regional Airport in Shalersville Township, north of Ravenna, in June 2013.

Bill Bower Park, a 1.7 acre green space with playground equipment and located in Bower's south Boulder neighborhood, was opened by the city in fall 2014.
