= Ravenna, Ohio =

- City
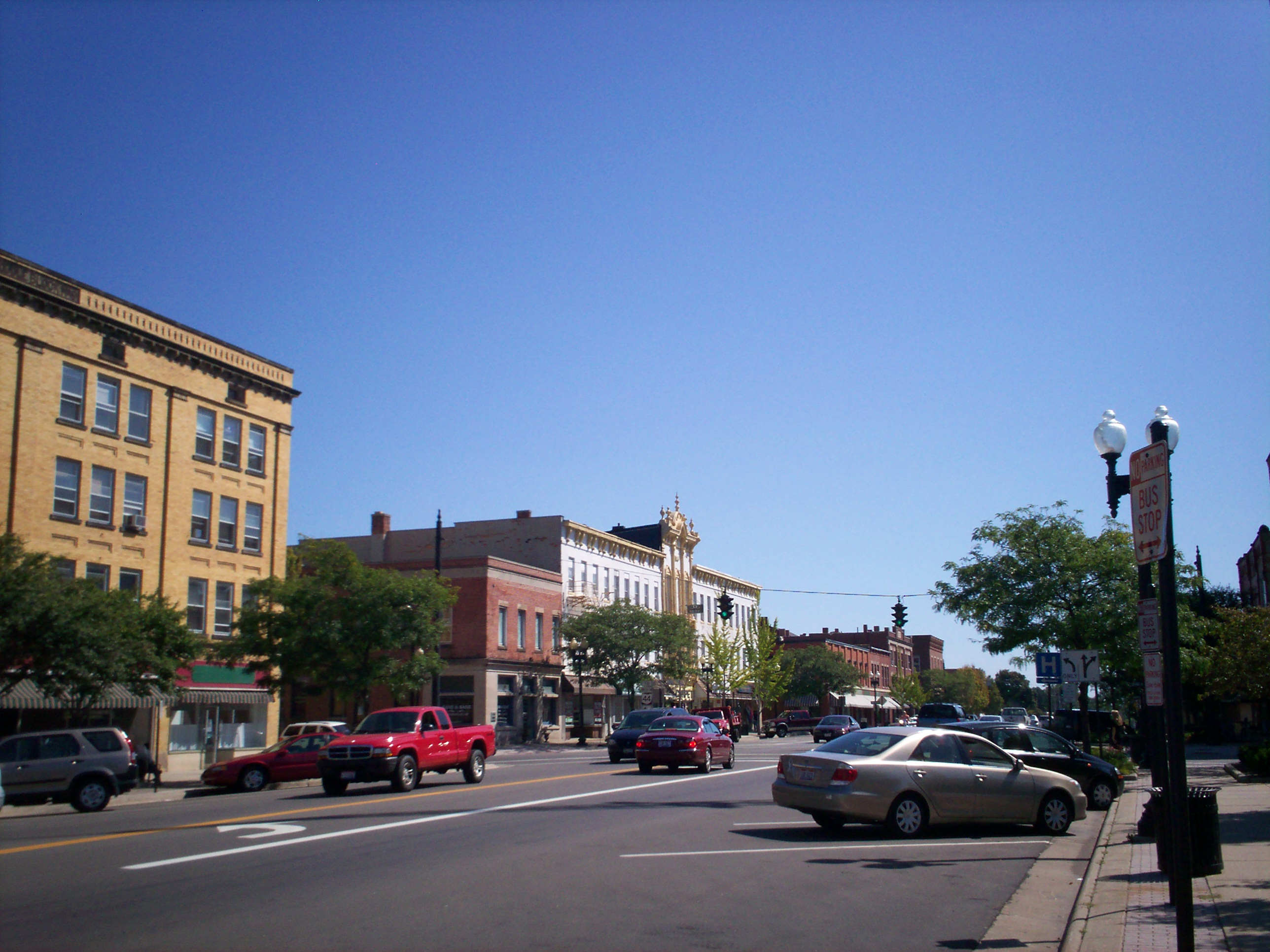
- Downtown Ravenna along Main Street in 2009

- Flag Logo
- Interactive map of Ravenna, Ohio
- Location within Ohio Location within the United States
- Coordinates: 41°09′31″N 81°14′36″W
- Country: United States
- State: Ohio
- County: Portage
- Founded: 1799
- Incorporated: 1853
- Founder: Benjamin Tappan
- Named for: Ravenna, Italy

Government
  - Type: Mayor–council

Area
  - Total: 5.68 sq mi (14.71 km^{2})
  - Land: 5.63 sq mi (14.59 km^{2})
  - Water: 0.046 sq mi (0.12 km^{2})
- Elevation: 1,112 ft (339 m)

Population (2020)
  - Total: 11,323
  - Density: 2,010.2/sq mi (776.14/km^{2})
- Demonym(s): Ravennese, Ravennan, Ravennate
- Time zone: UTC-5 (Eastern (EST))
  - Summer (DST): UTC-4 (EDT)
- ZIP code: 44266
- Area codes: 330, 234
- FIPS code: 39-65592
- GNIS feature ID: 2396324
- Website: www.ravennaoh.gov

Ravenna is a city in Portage County, Ohio, United States, and its county seat. The population was 11,323 at the 2020 census. It is located 15 miles (24 km) east of Akron. Formed from portions of Ravenna Township in the Connecticut Western Reserve, Ravenna was founded in 1799 and is named after the city of Ravenna, Italy. It is part of the Akron metropolitan area.

== History ==
Ravenna was founded by Benjamin Tappan, who arrived there on June 11, 1799, to lay claim in his father's name to land purchased in the Connecticut Western Reserve. Tappan did not stay in the area for long, however, but built a settlement of log cabins before returning to Connecticut during the summer of 1800.

Later in 1800, Tappan, newly married, returned to the area where the couple built a log cabin of their own. It was his new wife, Nancy Wright, who suggested that the settlement be named after the city of Ravenna, Italy. Nancy became a driving force for the new town. When plans were announced in 1806 for the formation of Portage County, she lobbied for Ravenna to be made the county seat, and it was selected in 1808. She also convinced other Connecticut families to move to the area. The Tappans, however, left Ravenna in 1809.

Ravenna was initially included in Franklin Township, which was part of Trumbull County at the time. The first mail route was established in 1802 and the first school opened in 1803. In 1810 the first county courthouse and log jail were built. This was later replaced with the first brick courthouse twenty years later in 1830, expanded with an addition in 1881. The current courthouse was built in 1961. The Congregational Church, established in 1822, was the first church to be founded in Ravenna. In 1824, the Methodist Church held its first meeting, which later formally organized in 1831. The Presbyterian and the Disciple of Christ churches were organized in 1830. In 1842, the Catholic Church in Ravenna was dedicated.

In 1831, the Clark Carriage Company, founded by W.D. Clark, first began to produce high-end hearses known for their elaborate workmanship and quality. Thirty years later, the company was purchased by Henry W. Riddle and Charles Merts in 1861, with Riddle being the salesman for the company and Merts running the factory. In 1891, Merts retired and sold his share of the company to Riddle, who, in turn, changed the name of the company to the Riddle Coach and Hearse. After the company began manufacturing motorized hearses, the name changed once again—this time to the Riddle Manufacturing Company. With the highly acclaimed reputation of the Riddle Hearse, two U.S. Presidents from Ohio, William McKinley and Warren G. Harding, would later make them their coach of choice for carrying their remains after their deaths.

In 1848, a glassworks was established, which is now commonly recognized as the first true industry in Ravenna. Rail service first arrived via the Cleveland and Pittsburgh Railroad in 1851. In 1877, the Quaker Oats Company was established in Ravenna with the familiar Quaker Oats logo patented in Ravenna in 1879.

On May 25, 1853, the Ohio Woman's Rights Association, founded in 1852 in Massillon, held its first statewide meeting in Ravenna. The attendees helped draft a petition to the Ohio General Assembly, requesting legislation that would grant women more rights.

On February 15, 1861, en route to his inauguration in Washington, DC, President-elect Abraham Lincoln traveled by train through Ravenna. He didn’t plan on speaking but, due to the enthusiastic supporters of the community and a stunning cannon salute, he stepped out of the train and addressed the crowd. A small plaque was placed at the site in 1985 to commemorate the event.

Telephones were first introduced in Ravenna in 1882. In 1898, Ravenna began paving its streets when East and West Main streets received new, paved surfaces. By 1909, nearly 50 passenger trains arrived in the town each day. In 1917, Portage County purchased White Hospital, which eventually became the present day University Hospitals Portage Medical Center.

In 1905, The A.C. Williams Co. was incorporated in Ravenna. Through the 1920s, the company was recognized as the largest cast-iron toy manufacturer in the world.

Since the 1970s, the city has held the Ravenna Balloon A-Fair. Usually held around mid-September, the event has attracted hot air balloonists and enthusiasts to locations such as Sunbeau Valley Farm in Ravenna Township, just west of the city limits. Besides the hot air balloons, there are also parades, cruise-ins, and live entertainment.

In the late 1990s, the downtown area received a $3 million facelift to restore and preserve the city’s architecture, history, and heritage.

== Geography ==
According to the United States Census Bureau, the city has a total area of 5.68 square miles (14.71 km^{2}), of which 5.63 square miles (14.58 km^{2}) is land and 0.05 square miles (0.13 km^{2}) is water.

== Demographics ==
Historical population
Census	Pop.	Note	%±
1830	306		—
1860	1,777		—
1870	2,188		23.1%
1880	3,255		48.8%
1890	3,417		5.0%
1900	4,003		17.1%
1910	5,310		32.7%
1920	7,219		36.0%
1930	8,019		11.1%
1940	8,538		6.5%
1950	9,857		15.4%
1960	10,918		10.8%
1970	11,780		7.9%
1980	11,987		1.8%
1990	12,069		0.7%
2000	11,771		−2.5%
2010	11,724		−0.4%
2020	11,323		−3.4%

=== 2020 census ===
As of the 2020 census, Ravenna had a population of 11,323. The median age was 41.3 years. 19.7% of residents were under the age of 18 and 19.1% of residents were 65 years of age or older. For every 100 females there were 93.2 males, and for every 100 females age 18 and over there were 89.5 males age 18 and over.

100.0% of residents lived in urban areas, while 0.0% lived in rural areas.

There were 5,138 households in Ravenna, of which 22.9% had children under the age of 18 living in them. Of all households, 32.5% were married-couple households, 22.9% were households with a male householder and no spouse or partner present, and 34.6% were households with a female householder and no spouse or partner present. About 39.3% of all households were made up of individuals and 16.0% had someone living alone who was 65 years of age or older.

There were 5,597 housing units, of which 8.2% were vacant. The homeowner vacancy rate was 2.2% and the rental vacancy rate was 7.9%.

Racial composition as of the 2020 census
Race	Number	Percent
White	9,361	82.7%
Black or African American	1,013	8.9%
American Indian and Alaska Native	47	0.4%
Asian	71	0.6%
Native Hawaiian and Other Pacific Islander	2	0.0%
Some other race	106	0.9%
Two or more races	723	6.4%
Hispanic or Latino (of any race)	243	2.1%

=== 2010 census ===
As of the census of 2010, there were 11,724 people, 5,055 households, and 2,860 families living in the city. The population density was 2,082.4 inhabitants per square mile (804.0/km^{2}). There were 5,566 housing units at an average density of 988.6 per square mile (381.7/km^{2}). The racial makeup of the city was 91.1% White, 5.6% African American, 0.2% Native American, 0.4% Asian, 0.3% from other races, and 2.3% from two or more races. Hispanic or Latino of any race were 1.4% of the population.

There were 5,055 households, of which 28.3% had children under the age of 18 living with them, 36.8% were married couples living together, 14.8% had a female householder with no husband present, 5.1% had a male householder with no wife present, and 43.4% were non-families. 35.4% of all households were made up of individuals, and 13.2% had someone living alone who was 65 years of age or older. The average household size was 2.28 and the average family size was 2.96.

The median age in the city was 37.9 years. 22.5% of residents were under the age of 18; 9.5% were between the ages of 18 and 24; 26.6% were from 25 to 44; 26.5% were from 45 to 64; and 14.9% were 65 years of age or older. The gender makeup of the city was 48.1% male and 51.9% female.

=== 2000 census ===
As of the census of 2000, there were 11,771 people, 4,980 households, and 2,997 families living in the city. The population density was 2,199.2 inhabitants per square mile (849.1/km^{2}). There were 5,313 housing units at an average density of 992.6 per square mile (383.2/km^{2}). The racial makeup of the city was 93.03% White, 4.42% Black, 0.25% American Indian, 0.39% Asian, 0.02% Pacific Islander, 0.23% from other races, and 1.67% from two or more races. Hispanic or Latino of any race were 0.91% of the population.

There were 4,980 households, out of which 28.3% had children under the age of 18 living with them, 43.0% were married couples living together, 12.8% had a female householder with no husband present, and 39.8% were non-families. 33.5% of all households were made up of individuals, and 13.5% had someone living alone who was 65 years of age or older. The average household size was 2.31 and the average family size was 2.95.

In the city the population was spread out, with 23.7% under the age of 18, 9.2% from 18 to 24, 30.0% from 25 to 44, 20.8% from 45 to 64, and 16.2% who were 65 years of age or older. The median age was 36 years. For every 100 females, there were 89.9 males. For every 100 females age 18 and over, there were 86.9 males.

The median income for a household in the city was $35,650, and the median income for a family was $46,090. Males had a median income of $33,574 versus $25,320 for females. The per capita income for the city was $17,862. About 6.0% of families and 10.3% of the population were below the poverty line, including 9.9% of those under age 18 and 11.1% of those age 65 or over.

== Government ==
Frank Seman was sworn in as mayor on January 1, 2016, succeeding Joseph Bica.

Prior to Bica, the mayor of Ravenna was Kevin Poland. Poland replaced long-time mayor Paul Jones who retired and moved to Florida after a scandal investigation regarding his practices as mayor. Ravenna Police Chief Randy McCoy initiated formal investigations by the county prosecutor after learning that the FBI had begun conducting a formal investigation of the former Mayor. The major focus of the city's investigation involved the Mayor's son, Paul Jones Jr., who was paid more than $274,900 over eight years for a questionable mowing contract.

In March 2007, Jones was sentenced to sixteen months in a federal prison for various fraud charges.

== Education ==
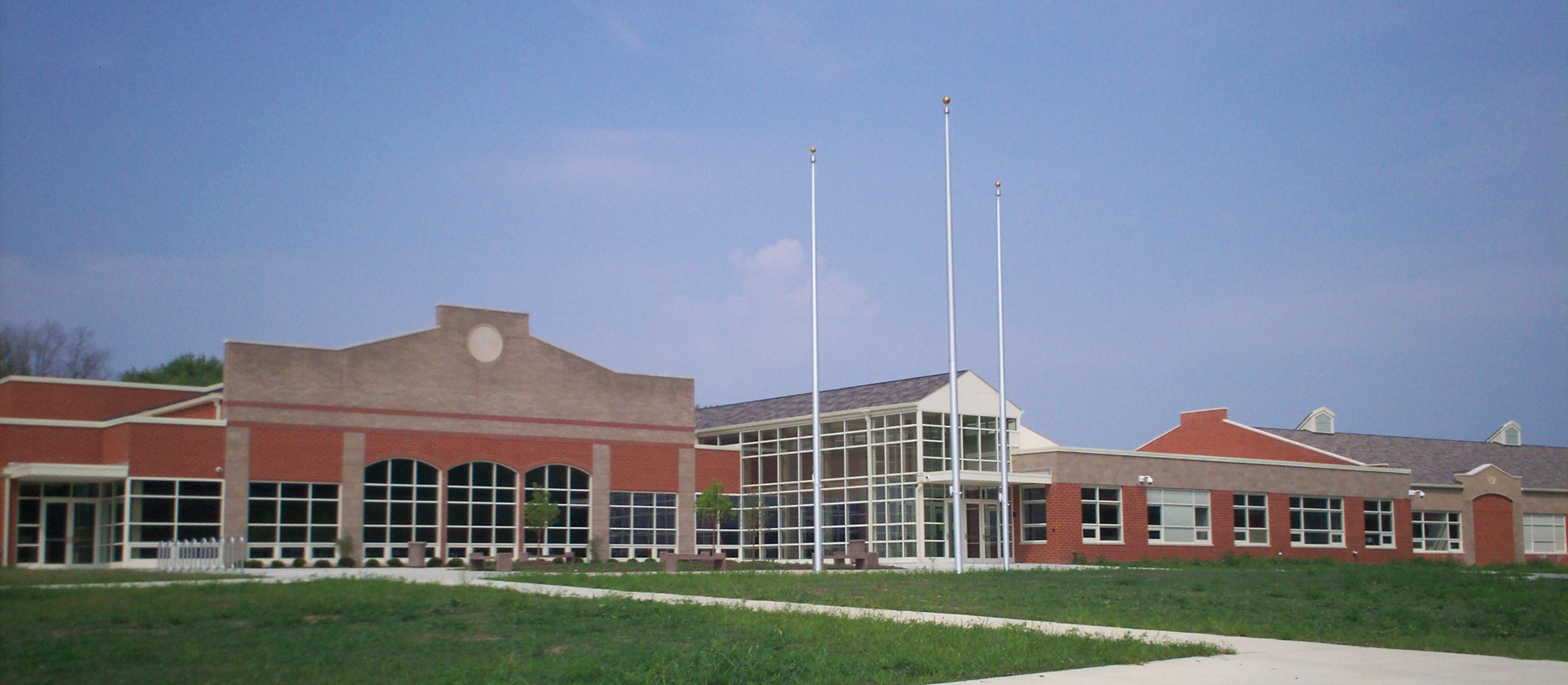
Ravenna High School

Elementary and secondary education for students in Ravenna and Ravenna Township is provided by the Ravenna School District, which includes Ravenna High School for grades 9–12 and Brown Middle School for grades 5–8. The district reorganized its elementary buildings for the 2020–21 school year, closing Carlin Elementary and grouping grade levels together. Previously, the district had operated four neighborhood elementary schools each with grades 1–5. Kindergarten students attend West Park Elementary, Willyard Elementary houses the district's 1st and 2nd graders, and West Main Elementary houses grades 3 and 4. The district's preschool program and child care center are located in the former Carlin Elementary School building.

Ravenna is also home to the Maplewood Career Center, a vocational school which serves high school-aged students from ten high schools in Portage and Summit counties and offers adult education programs. The Bio-Med Science Academy, a public STEM school for grades 2–12, has a campus in Ravenna at the former Fortis College location that houses the program's 5th and 6th graders. Grades 2–4 are housed at Bio-Med's Shalersville campus and grades 7–12 are located at the Rootstown campus.

A campus of Fortis College, a small, private for-profit school, was located in northern Ravenna near State Route 14. It closed at the end of 2018 due to declining enrollment.

== Infrastructure ==
The following highways pass through Ravenna:

- State Route 59
- State Route 44
- State Route 14
- State Route 88

Ravenna is located south of Interstate 80/Ohio Turnpike exit 193, and north of Interstate 76 exit 38.

== Notable people ==
- Chris Bangle; automobile designer
- Dana Beal; Youth International Party (Yippie movement) figure and marijuana activist
- Wally Bell; MLB umpire
- Bill Bower, last surviving pilot of the Doolittle Raid Recipient of the Air Medal
- Ralph Pomeroy Buckland; U.S. Representative from Ohio, brigadier general in the Union Army.
- David D. Busch; best-selling author
- Curt Cacioppo, classical pianist born in Ravenna
- Gerald Casale; founding member of the band Devo, was born in Ravenna
- William Rufus Day; U.S. Supreme Court justice
- Calvin Hampton; classical organist, raised in Ravenna
- Robert B. "Yank" Heisler; Key Bank chairman, Dean Kent State University College of Business Administration
- Al Hodge; actor in films such as Captain Video and The Green Hornet and producer of The Lone Ranger radio program
- Arthur E. Juve; B. F. Goodrich inventor known for applying elastomer technology in printing
- Maynard James Keenan; singer for Tool, A Perfect Circle, and Puscifer
- Marvin Kent; politician and businessman, namesake of the nearby city of Kent
- Peggy King; singer and television personality
- Frederick J. Loudin; Singer and leader of the Fisk Jubilee Singers, inventor and manufacturer
- Jessica Lea Mayfield; singer-songwriter
- Don Nottingham; pro football player
- Fela Sowande; Nigerian-born musician and composer who lived in Ravenna while on faculty at Kent State University
- Henry Adoniram Swift; third governor of Minnesota
- Jack Trice; college football player at Iowa State and namesake of the school's football stadium
- Erastus B. Tyler; Union general in the American Civil War
- Jeff West; pro football kicker
- Don M. Wilson III; former Chief Risk Officer at JP Morgan Chase Bank
