= Ravenna School District =

School district in Ohio, United States

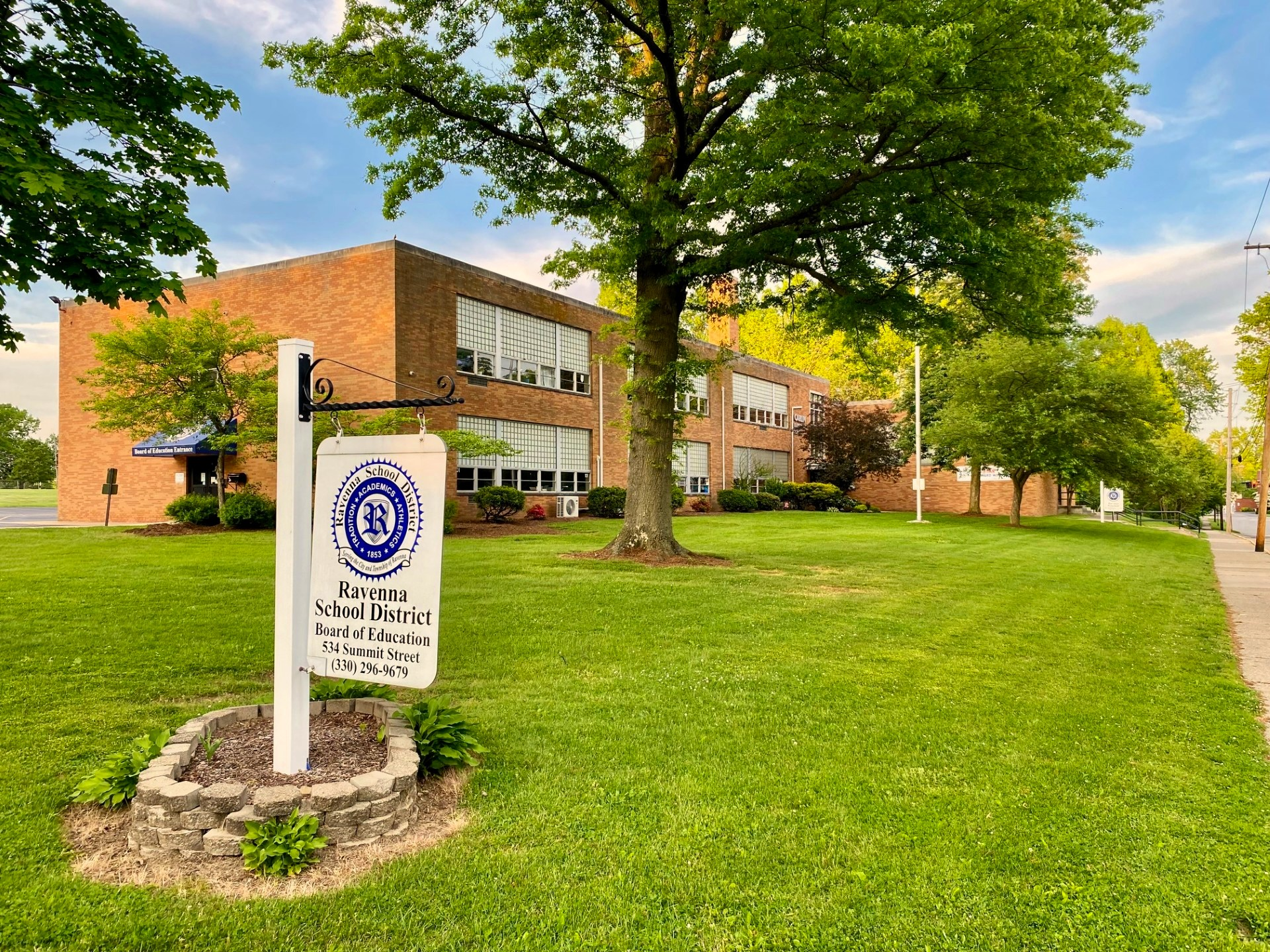

Address
- 534 Summit Street Ravenna, Ohio, 44266; United States

District information
- Type: Public
- Grades: PK–12
- Established: 1853; 173 years ago
- Superintendent: Laura Hebert
- Schools: 5
- NCES District ID: 3904468

Students and staff
- Students: 1,874 (2024–2025)
- Teachers: 131.85 (on an FTE basis) (2024–2025)
- Staff: 193.12 (on an FTE basis) (2024–2025)
- Student–teacher ratio: 14.21 (2024–2025)

Other information
- Website: www.ravennaschools.us

The Ravenna School District, formally the Ravenna City School District, is a public school district located in Ravenna, Ohio, United States. The district serves students in preschool through 12th grade living in Ravenna and Ravenna Township, and small portions of Shalersville and Charlestown townships.

== Schools ==
- Ravenna Junior/Senior High School, grades 7–12
- Brown Intermediate School, grades 3–6
- Willyard Elementary School, grades K–2
- Ravenna Preschool, preschool

Prior to 1997, students in grades K–5 attended one of five neighborhood elementary schools, grades 6–8 were at Brown Middle School, and grades 9–12 at Ravenna High School. A new organization was adopted in February 1997 and implemented at the beginning of the 1997–98 school year. The changes in 1997 moved all kindergarten students to West Park Elementary School, and all fifth and sixth grade students to Rausch Intermediate School, adjacent to Brown Middle School, which became a school for grades seven and eight. Students who had previously attended West Park were split between Carlin and West Main Elementary Schools. This organization stayed in place until 2008 when Rausch Intermediate closed, necessitating the return of students in grade five to their neighborhood elementary school and grade six to Brown Middle School. When Tappan Elementary closed in 2013, students were sent to one of the three remaining elementary schools with most being assigned to West Main.

The current district organization, which centralizes each grade level at a specific building rather than have neighborhood elementary schools, was first implemented beginning in the 2020–21 school year. Carlin Elementary School closed at the end of the 2019–20 school year, and all elementary buildings were repurposed. Kindergarten remained at West Park Elementary School, while students in 1st and 2nd grades were assigned to Willyard Elementary School and all students in 3rd and 4th grades assigned to West Main Elementary School. 5th graders were moved to Brown Middle School, while the Ravenna Preschool was moved to the former Carlin Elementary School, along with district offices.

The Ravenna Intervention School for Exceptional Students, RISE, was established at the former Rausch Intermediate School building in 2019, but was discontinued in 2022. West Park Elementary School was closed at the end of the 2024–25 school year and kindergartners were moved to Willyard Elementary School.

In January 2026 the Ravenna School District announced plans to close West Main Elementary School at the end of the 2025–26 school year, citing declining enrollment and financial issues. Beginning with the 2026–27 school year, students who were attending or would have enrolled at the school were moved to Brown Middle School, which was reorganized for grades 3 through 6 as Brown Intermediate School, while grades 7 and 8 were moved to Ravenna High School, which was renamed Ravenna Junior/Senior High School. Kindergartners through grade 2 remained at Willyard Elementary School. The district also began exploring the possibility of building an addition to Ravenna High School that would house students in grades K–6 and centralize all students except the preschool on a single campus.

== Former schools ==
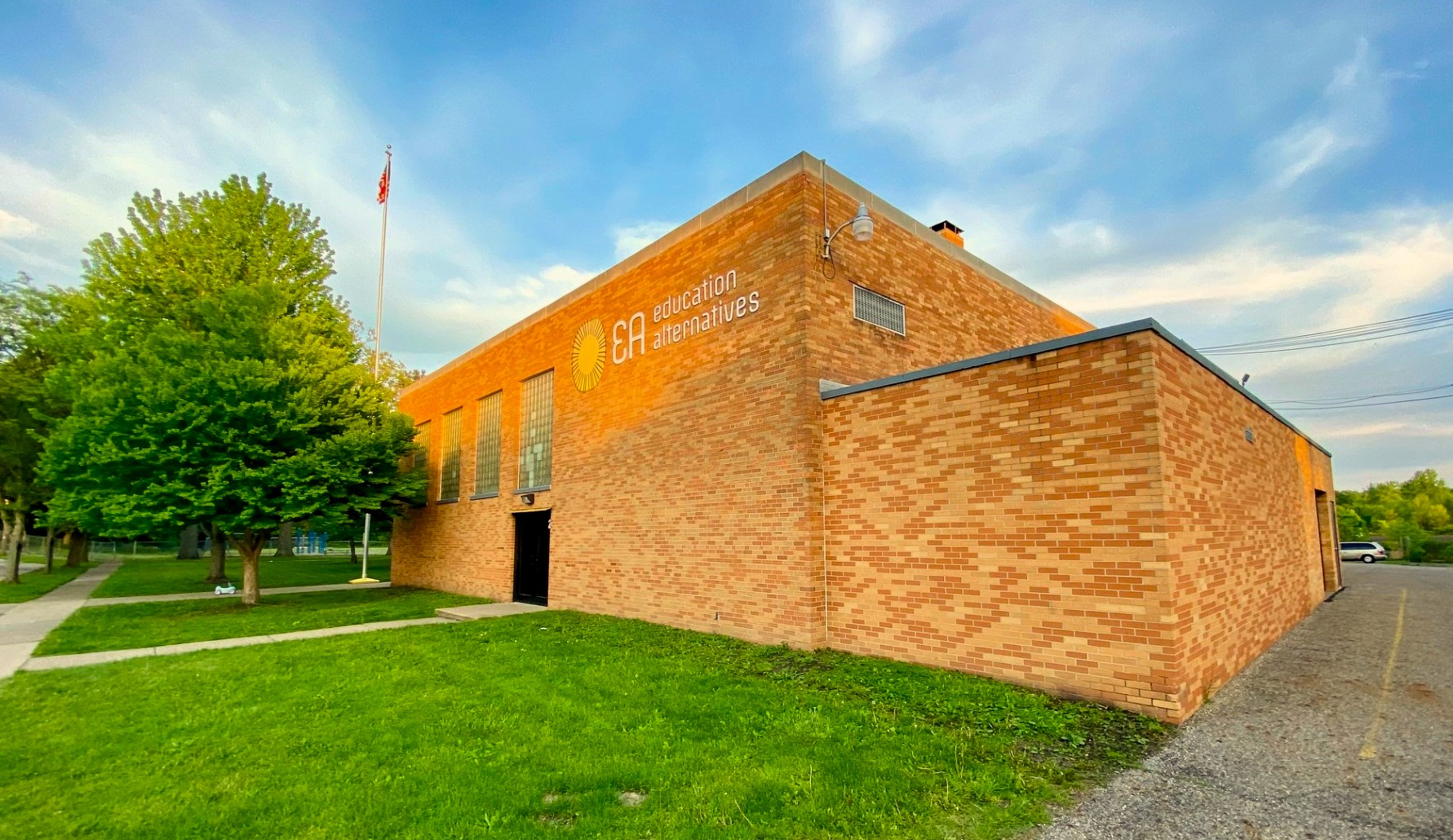
Former Tappan Elementary now Education Alternatives

- Carlin Elementary School, grades 1–5 (closed after the 2019–20 school year). Since 2020, the building serves as the district's preschool program and houses some of the central office staff.
- Rausch Intermediate School, grades 5 and 6 (closed after the 2007–08 school year). From 2019 to 2022, the building served as the home of the Ravenna Intervention School for Exceptional Students (RISE), a school for students in grades 5 through 12 with autism, learning disabilities, attention deficit hyperactivity disorder (ADHD), emotional disorders, and other conditions. The Rausch building, which includes the original 1915 Ravenna Township School, is vacant as of December 2025.
- Tappan Elementary School, grades 1–5 (closed after the 2012–13 school year). The building is leased by Education Alternatives.
- West Main Elementary School, grades 3–4 (closed after the 2025–26 school year).
- West Park Elementary School, kindergarten (closed after the 2024–25 school year). The building was sold to a realty group in September 2025.
