= Keith Schengili-Roberts =

Keith Schengili-Roberts is a long-time author on Internet technologies, beginning with his work for the magazines Toronto Computes! in the early 1990s and then The Computer Paper from the mid-1990s up until 2003. He also currently lectures on Information Architecture at the University of Toronto's iSchool. Previous to IXIASOFT, Keith was a DITA consultant for Mekon, working with teams at ARM, Schlumberger, eBay Deutschland and Infineon.

== Author ==
In 1994 he worked on Delrina's Cyberjack Web browser and on its accompanying Web site, one of the first commercial Web sites. His long-running series on HTML, Weaving Your Own Web Site was drawn from his professional experience, and ran monthly for almost just over 90 issues in The Computer Paper Publication. Many of the early issues in this series were pulled together to form the core of his first book The Advanced HTML Companion in 1997.

Since then several other books have followed. His interest in CSS began while writing his second book on HTML in 1998, when he realized that there were no good references on the subject. So he decided to write one.

== Musician ==
Between 1988 and 1991 Schengili-Roberts was in a Kingston, Ontario indie band called "Miscellaneous 'S'". Occasional one-off reunions have taken place since then.

== Bibliography ==
- Current Practices and Trends in Technical and Professional Communication ISBN 0950645990 (published 2017) Contributed a chapter to this book
- Core CSS, 2nd Edition ISBN 0-13-009278-9 (published 2004)
- Core CSS ISBN 0-13-083456-4 (published 2000)
- The Advanced HTML Companion, 2nd Edition (co-written with Kim Silk) ISBN 0-12-623542-2 (published 1998)
- The Advanced HTML Companion (Japanese Translation) ISBN 4-8337-4534-8 (published 1997)
- The Advanced HTML Companion ISBN 0-12-623540-6 (published 1997)
