= Deke McClelland =

Donald Hugh McClelland Jr., known as Deke McClelland (born 1962), is an American author and expert in Adobe products, most notably Photoshop, but also Illustrator, InDesign and Photoshop Elements.

== Bibliography ==
Year	Title	Notes	Publisher
1993–present	The Photoshop Bible	McClelland parted company with the book's present publishers (Wiley), but current versions of the book still carry his name.	IDG; Wiley
2005	Adobe Photoshop CS2 One-On-One		Deke Press / O'Reilly
2005	Adobe InDesign One-On-One		Deke Press / O'Reilly
2005	Photoshop Elements 4 One-On-One		Deke Press / O'Reilly

== Training videos ==
He has hosted over 80 video tutorials, totaling upwards of 2000 hours for different Adobe Applications (mainly Photoshop, InDesign and Illustrator)

Title	Format
Total Training for Adobe Photoshop 5	VHS
Total Training for Adobe Photoshop 6	VHS
Total Training for Adobe Photoshop 7	CD-ROM
Total Training for Adobe Photoshop CS	DVD-ROM
Total Training for Adobe Photoshop CS2	DVD-ROM
Photoshop CS2 Actions & Automation	DVD-ROM
Photoshop CS2 Mastering Camera Raw	DVD-ROM
Photoshop Elements 5 Essential Training	DVD-ROM
Photoshop CS2 Channels & Masks	DVD-ROM
Photoshop CS3 One-on-One: Beyond the Basics	DVD-ROM
Photoshop CS3 One-on-One: Advanced Techniques	DVD-ROM
Photoshop CS3 One-on-One: The Essentials	DVD-ROM
Illustrator CS3 One-on-One: The Essentials	ONLINE
Illustrator CS3 One-On-One: Beyond the Basics	ONLINE
Illustrator CS3 One-On-One: Advanced Techniques	ONLINE
Photoshop Top 40	ONLINE
Photoshop CS4 One-on-One: Fundamentals	DVD-ROM
Photoshop CS4 One-on-One: Advanced	DVD-ROM
Photoshop CS4 One-on-One: Mastery	DVD-ROM

Lynda.com has a full list of video tutorials hosted by McClelland.

== Awards ==
- The Benjamin Franklin Award for Best Computer Book (1989)
- Inducted into the Photoshop Hall of Fame (2002)

== Personal life ==
McClelland lives in Boulder, Colorado, with his two sons.
