= David D. Busch =

American photographer & author

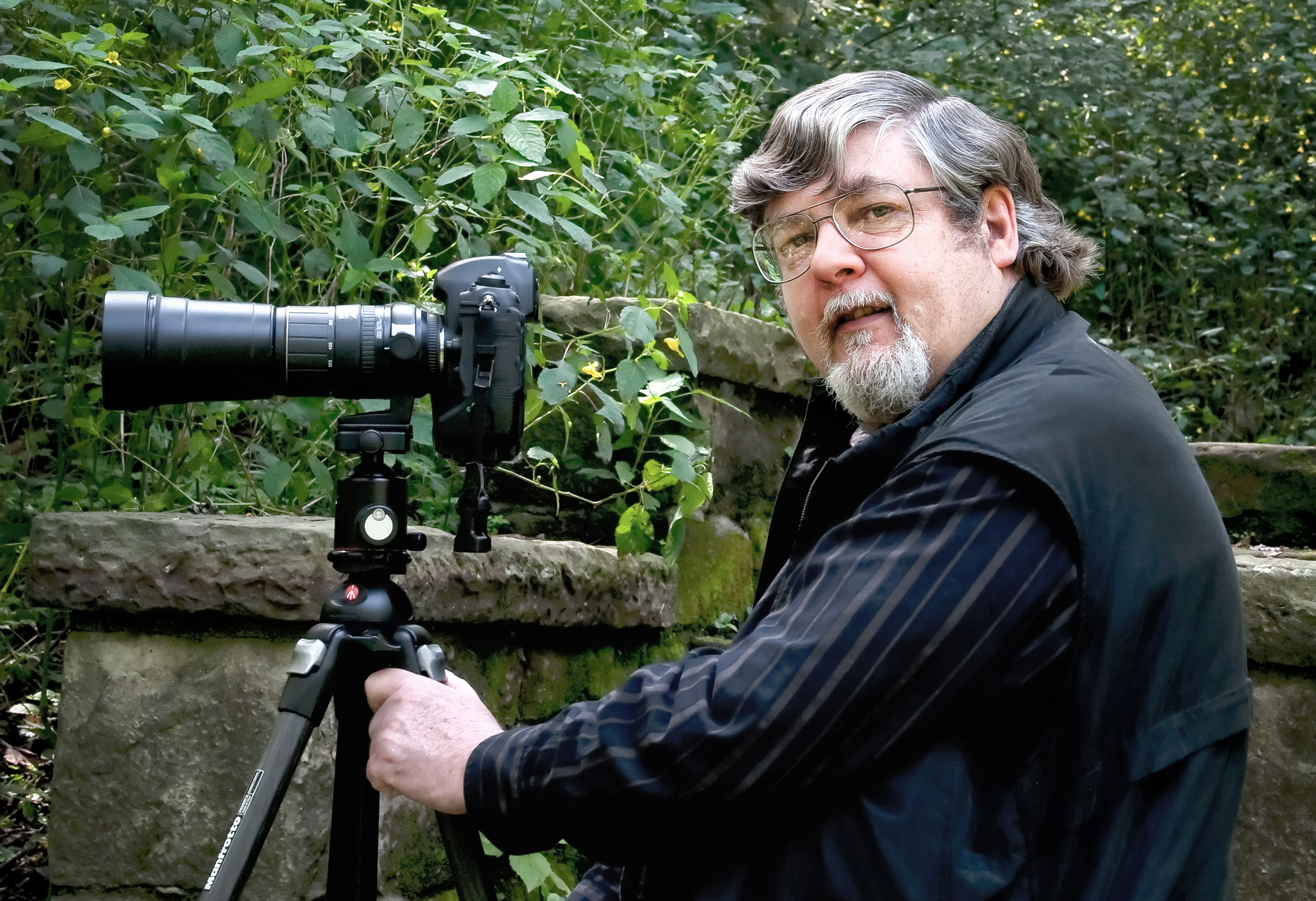
- Born: Ravenna, Ohio
- Education: Kent State University
- Occupations: Publisher, Laserfaire Press and Creative Director of David Busch Group
- Website: www.dbusch.com, www.laserfairepress.com, www.dslrguides.com

David D. Busch is a photographer and author and publisher of more than 300 books with a total of more than three million copies in print, and thousands of photography- and technology-related articles for Popular Photography, Rangefinder, Professional Photographer, Computer Shopper, and other magazines. He is best known for the classic imaging handbook Digital Photography All in One Desk Reference for Dummies, which, along with Mastering Digital Photography, was named by About.com as the top two of five recommended books for digital photography beginners. He is the main author and series editor of David Busch's Quick Snap Guides, David Busch's Pro Secrets, David Busch's Fast Track Guides, and David Busch's Guides to Digital SLR Photography, and founder/publisher of Laserfaire Press.

Busch began writing about photography, electronics and computers in the early 1970s, and for 20 years was a photojournalist who roamed the United States writing illustrated articles on imaging and technology. He was the author of the popular Kitchen Table International humor column in the early computer magazine 80 Microcomputing (also known as 80 Micro) from 1981 to 1983. In 1984, his first book, Sorry About The Explosion, based on the KTI columns, chronicled the advances and products of the fictional vaporware software company Kitchen Technology Inc., and won a Computer Press Association Award the following year for Best Fiction Book. In 1986, his book Secrets of MacWrite, MacPaint, and MacDraw was voted Best Product Specific Book, and Busch was asked to co-host the Computer Press Awards held at the Plaza Hotel in 1987. In the late 1980s and early 1990s, he turned from programming and application books to imaging technology, writing some of the first books devoted to scanners (The Complete Scanner Handbook, Dow-Jones Irwin, 1990) and digital Photography (Digital Photography, MIS Press, 1995.)

While working full-time as an author, Busch continued to write articles and monthly columns for magazines such HomePC, Macworld, Internet World, NetGuide, Windows Magazine, Windows Sources, and many other publications. He also reviewed digital cameras and printers for CNet Network and Computer Shopper Magazine. Today he is best known for photography books such as David Busch's Digital Photography Bucket List: 100 Great Digital Photos You Must Take Before You Die, featuring the work of members of the Cleveland Photographic Society, Digital Photography for Dummies Quick Reference, Digital SLR Cameras and Photography for Dummies, seventy-five Digital Field Guides for leading Nikon and Sony digital SLR camera models, and sixteen guidebooks for Canon dSLRs. Many of Busch's books, such as Digital SLR Pro Secrets and Digital Infrared Pro Secrets highlight often-quirky do-it-yourself projects, including equipment testing devices, camera hacks and conversions, filters, lighting equipment, and other gadgets.

Busch was born in Ravenna, Ohio, but lived in Rochester, N.Y. for four years. He has a B.A. in Public Relations - Journalism from Kent State University, and has worked as a newspaper and magazine journalist, PR consultant, sports photographer, sports information director, photojournalist, and studio photographer.

== Awards ==
- Computer Press Association Book Awards:
  - Best Fiction Book (1985): Sorry About The Explosion! (1985, Prentice Hall)
  - Best Product Specific Book (1986): Secrets of MacWrite, MacPaint, and MacDraw (1986, Little, Brown)
