= Don M. Wilson III =

Don M. Wilson III (born 1948) is an American banker with expertise in corporate banking, global capital markets, and risk management. He was appointed as the first chief risk officer at JPMorgan Chase & Co. in 2003 and retired in 2006. He began his career in the management training program at Chemical Bank in New York (a predecessor institution) in 1973 and later held senior executive positions in New York, Tokyo, and London.

In 2008, Bank of Montreal, Canada's first bank, founded in 1817, appointed Wilson to its board of directors, where he served for twelve years, including chair of the Risk Review Committee of the BMO Board for eight years.

A native of Ravenna, Ohio, he was inducted into the community's Ravenna Raven Hall of Fame in 1992. He graduated as valedictorian at Ravenna High School in 1966.

He is a retired vice chairman of the board of directors of Goodwill Industries of Greater New York and Northern New Jersey, Inc. and a member of the Council on Foreign Relations. and The Most Venerable Order of the Hospitallers of St. John of Jerusalem. He has served as a trustee for six years of St. Bernard's School, a boys' private school in Manhattan. He is former Trustee at the Brick Presbyterian Church in Manhattan. Wilson served both as chairman of Tuck Annual Giving at the Tuck School at Dartmouth College and as an overseer at Tuck School, each for more than ten years. Since 2005 Wilson has served as chair of Leadership Giving and chair of Reunion Giving for the Harvard University Class of 1970. He currently serves on the Committee on University Resources at Harvard University. For many years Wilson has served on the Museum & Archives Committee at the United States Golf Association, and he is Founding Trustee of the USGA Foundation. In 2016 Wilson was elected to the board of directors of the Global Risk Institute in Toronto, Canada.

Wilson has an AB cum laude from Harvard University in 1970 and an MBA from Tuck School at Dartmouth College in 1973. He was awarded the Albert H. Gordon ‘23 Award at Harvard University and the Overseers Medal at Tuck School at Dartmouth College. He also holds a Certificate of Theology and Ministry from Princeton Theological Seminary and a National Security Seminar Certificate from the Army War College at Carlisle, Pennsylvania.

Wilson has edited, introduced, and published three books on his hometown ("Ravenna---A Bicentennial Album of 19th Century Photographs" (1999); "Here at My Window: Poems by Bernice Douglass" (2001); and, "Greetings from Ravenna: Picture Postcards, 1905–1925" (2009)).

Wilson has also edited and/or published twenty four limited-edition golf history books from 2005–2023. Since 2020, Wilson has been the proprietor and publisher of Grant Books Ltd (www.grant books.co.uk) located in Pershore, England and founded in 1971.

Wilson and his wife Lynn were married in 1984. They have three adult children.
