= Calvin Hampton =

American musician

- Born: December 31, 1938
- Origin: United States
- Died: August 5, 1984 (aged 45)
- Occupations: Organist and Sacred music composer

(George) Calvin Hampton (December 31, 1938 – August 5, 1984) was a leading American organist and sacred music composer.

Hampton was born in Kittanning, Pennsylvania and raised in Ravenna, Ohio. He graduated from Oberlin Conservatory in 1960 and from Syracuse University in 1963.

From September 1963 through June 1983, he was organist and choirmaster at Calvary Episcopal Church in the Gramercy Park neighborhood of Manhattan. His “Fridays at Midnight” organ recital series, which ran from 1974 to 1983, was among the most well-known and popular organ recital series in American history.

Hampton also composed music for the church and the concert stage. In 1974, he composed music for Walter Leyden Brown's production of Herman Melville's Pierre, or the Ambiguities, which was produced at La MaMa Experimental Theatre Club in the East Village of Manhattan. Before Hampton's death, Erik Routley, an authority on church music, called Hampton "the greatest living composer of hymn tunes." His settings of the Episcopal liturgy are also used in Catholic churches, and his choral works are innovative and challenging pieces of sacred music.

Hampton also transcribed music from other sources for the organ. His versions of Modest Mussorgsky's Pictures at an Exhibition and César Franck's Symphony in D minor for organ are particularly noteworthy. Hampton's views on the proper design and function of the organ, particularly in the orchestral context, were controversial because they conflicted with neo-Baroque views.

Hampton eventually stopped working at the church to concentrate on composition and organ consulting. During this time, he consulted for several important classical organs in the United States. He contracted AIDS but remained active until the final few weeks of his life, composing the massive Alexander Variations for two pipe organs while almost completely bedridden in 1984. He died at the age of 45 near his parents’ home in Port Charlotte, Florida.
