= Robert B. "Yank" Heisler =

American banker (1949–2017)

Robert B. "Yank" Heisler Jr. (July 4, 1949 – April 11, 2017) was the retired chairman of KeyBank, the 12th largest bank in the United States by total assets, the retired chief executive officer of McDonald Financial Group, and was the dean of the Kent State University College of Business Administration and Graduate School of Management until 2011. The Kent State business school under Heisler's leadership was selected by The Princeton Review for its 2009 list of the top business education programs in the United States. In 2005, he was named to the Inside Business Hall of Fame.

== Early life and education ==
Heisler was raised in Ravenna, Ohio, roughly 40 miles southeast of Cleveland. He was an all-star athlete in golf, basketball, and football at Ravenna High School from 1962–1966, winning back-to-back State Championships in golf his junior and senior years. He was inducted for his athletic accomplishments into the Ravenna Raven Hall of Fame, which also recognized his later business leadership.

He graduated cum laude with a bachelor's degree in biochemistry from Harvard College in 1970 and earned his master's degree in business administration from Kent State University in 1974. He also attended Northwestern University's National Graduate Trust School, the University of Oklahoma's Commercial Lending School, Duke University's Fuqua School of Business' Bank Executive Management Program and Harvard Graduate Business School's Program for Management Development.

== Career ==
After graduating from Kent State with his MBA, Heisler went into banking with the former Goodyear Bank in Akron, Ohio. In October 1976, he became an assistant vice president of the Corporate Loan Review Division for Second National Bank in Ravenna, an affiliate of Society Bank (a predecessor of KeyBank). In less than two years, January 1978, he was elected president and chief executive officer of Second National Bank.

In September 1982, he was elected vice president and senior regional manager for Society National Bank. In January 1984, he was named president of the Akron District. He was elected executive vice president of the bank in August 1986 and deputy manager of the Retail Banking Group. In May 1990, he was elected senior executive vice president and named vice chairman of Society National Bank in January 1993.

In March 1994 when Society and KeyBank merged, Heisler was sent to Seattle, Washington, to lead seven state bank region in capital markets and commercial banking product lines. In June 1995, he was named president and chief executive officer of Society National Bank, which would later be renamed KeyBank National Association (N.A.) once the merger was fully integrated. Later he would also add the title of Chairman of KeyBank.

Heisler was named CEO of McDonald in December 2004, replacing Robert "Bob" Jones who left to become President and CEO of Old National Bank. However, Heisler would retain the title of chairman of KeyBank N.A. He would be the last CEO of McDonald, which was eventually sold to the U.S. investment arm of Swiss banking giant UBS AG in 2007. Heisler was instrumental in the negotiations with UBS.

In September 2008, Heisler was named dean of the College of Business at Kent State University. He was previously the interim vice president for business and finance for the university.

He was a member of the board of directors for FirstEnergy Corporation, an electric utility company based in Akron, Ohio, from 2006. He previously served on FirstEnergy board between 1998 and 2004.

== Community ==
Heisler was the chairman of Team NEO, a regional economic development organization in Northeast Ohio, from 2004 to 2008. He remains on Team NEO's advisory council.

He served on the Championship Committee for the NEC Invitational at Firestone Country Club, the Growth Association of Greater Cleveland, the Center for Families and Children, the Ronald McDonald House. He also serves as treasurer of the Musical Arts Association, and as a trustee on the boards of The Union Club, Business Volunteers Unlimited, Kent State University Foundation (chair), Ohio High School Athletic Association Foundation, and is president of Leadership Cleveland class of 1993.
