= Workwriter =

Workwriter was a word processor software written in C, in 1983 and 1984, by Peter P. Vekinis, similar in features and operation to dedicated word processors marketed by AES Data Inc.

The software was sold to Tandy Europe, subsidiary of Tandy Corporation (more than 4000 copies were shipped in French, English and German) for the Amstrad CPC 6128 personal computer under the CP/M operating system. Britain's PC World magazine published an article on Workwriter It was in the November 1984 issue. It was also made available for the IBM PC under MS-DOS and PC DOS operating systems and other similar computers.

Workwriter had a simple user interface and was a video-based word processor, in other words, users could type text wherever they wanted on the screen. This was unlike other word processors who displayed structured text on a screen (users could not move their cursor outside the text and type). The ability made Workwriter easy to use since the user was presented with a physical page metaphor. Pages were 80 characters by 99 lines long. Pages were strung together to create chapters and documents. The software offered columns, character-based graphics, justifications and multiple character sets. It supported many printers, including those with daisy wheels.

The software was further improved with additional features (such as built-in serial communications, pagination and index creation) and was finally sold and became the word processing part of legal software in Belgium. You can download a copy and see how it works here.
