= The Computer Paper =

Canadian magazine

- Editor: Douglas Alder (1988–1997)
- Former editors: Graeme Bennett, David Tanaka, Jeff Evans
- Categories: Computer magazines
- Frequency: Monthly
- Circulation: 365,000
- First issue: February 1988
- Final issue: November 2008
- Company: Canada Computer Paper Inc.
- Country: Canada
- Based in: Toronto
- Language: English
- Website: www.tcp.ca
- ISSN: 0840-3929

The Computer Paper (sometimes referred to as TCP, for a time HUB, and then HUB-The Computer Paper) was a monthly computer magazine that was published in Canada (both in print and online) from February 1988 until November 2008. The magazine was originally published by Canada Computer Paper Inc. It was purchased in 1997 by Hebdo Mag International of Paris, France, and then to Piccolo Publishing Ltd of Toronto in 2003. Publication ceased in November 2008 due to declining ad revenues.

== Overview ==
The Computer Paper which billed itself as "Canada's Computer Information Source", and "Canada's Largest Computer Monthly", provided reviews, previews of computer hardware and software for home users and information technology professionals. The intention was to provide a Canadian view of the rapidly changing computer marketplace. Articles were written by journalists and technology specialists in a wide range of fields. As the computer market changed, the publication was broadened to include coverage of printers, PDAs, digital cameras, video cameras, smart phones, personal music players and other consumer electronics. Each issue would have a focus article, usually featured on the cover of the magazine. Examples included Canadian accounting software, payroll programs, desktop publishing and telecommunications. Regular columns were devoted to specific topics such as shareware software. The Computer Paper also included wire stories from the Newsbytes News Network.

Similar in style to American regional magazines such as Computer Currents, Micro Times and Computer User, The Computer Paper was printed on newsprint on a monthly basis and was distributed free to readers as it was entirely advertising supported. At its peak The Computer Paper was distributed from six offices across Canada: Vancouver, Calgary, Winnipeg, Toronto, Ottawa and Montreal with a circulation of 365,000 copies a month in five separate, regional editions. Distribution was done largely through computer retail outlets, free street boxes and other high volume locations.

Commencing in January 1995, The Computer Paper launched TCP Labs, to provide benchmarking of computers, printers and other hardware. The goal was to provide Canadian purchasers with an unbiased overview of products available in the Canadian market. Winners of the hardware survey each month would be selected for an "Editor's Choice Award". The testing Lab was located in the Toronto offices of The Computer Paper. The first lab tests featured benchmark testing on a number of Canadian and internationally manufactured Pentium and 486 computers. The second lab featured laptops and color inkjet printers.

=== Competitors ===
Throughout the 1990s, The Computer Paper had competitors in most regional markets, including Our Computer Player in Vancouver, The Computer Post in Winnipeg, Toronto Computes! and later We Compute in Toronto and Monitor & M2 in Ottawa. The national distribution of The Computer Paper meant that most national level advertisers (IBM, Microsoft, Dell etc.) would select it over these other regional publications. According to an article in the Globe and Mail (June 1994), "Advertisers like the broad exposure. Ottawa software developer Corel Corp. says the paper is one of its 'priority' Canadian publications, as does IBM Canada Ltd. of Markham, Ont., which had 3 1/2 pages of ads in last month's issue."

=== Expansion ===
In addition to expanding from the BC market, across Canada, Canada Computer Paper Inc, owners of The Computer Paper, also purchased a number of competitive publications, as well as launching other titles based on these acquisitions. The BC Edition of The Computer Paper was launched in February 1988. The Alberta Edition was launched in June 1989, with the two Alberta partners being bought out in June 1990. In December 1990, a Prairie edition was launched in Winnipeg, Regina, and Saskatoon.

A Toronto edition launched in March 1992. In February 1994, Canada Computer Paper Inc., negotiated to purchase its major Toronto competitor Toronto Computes! from publisher David Carter of Context Publishing. In December 1994, Vancouver Computes! was launched from the editorial provided by Toronto Computes!. By owning two publications in both Toronto and Vancouver, Canada Computer Paper Inc., was able to effectively be bi-weekly in the two largest Canadian markets.

In February 1994, the Eastern Edition of The Computer Paper was launched for Ottawa, Montreal and a number of Atlantic cities. This was a zoned publication. It began with 75,000 circulation split three ways. In August 1994, in response to advertisers' requests, Montreal's circulation was increased to 50,000. Ottawa was also adjusted to 30,000 circulation.

In 1996, Our Computer Player was purchased in the Vancouver market and rebranded as Vancouver Computes!. A French-language version of the Computes! brand was launched in Montreal called Quebec Micro!. Also in 1996, Government Computer, a publication focused on purchasing of hardware and software by government and located in Ottawa, was purchased.

=== Editors and Writers ===
Editors, regular writers and contributors to The Computer Paper:

- Douglas Alder (Founder, Publisher/Editor-in-Chief)
- Kathryn Alexander Alder (Co-Publisher and Consulting Partner)
- Graeme Bennett (Managing Editor)
- Sean Carruthers (Test Lab Editor)
- Jeff Evans (Technical Editor) (Toronto)
- Megan Johnston (Editor)
- James MacFarlane
- Geoff Martin (Editor-in-Chief)
- Andrew Moore-Crispin (Editor-in-Chief)
- Dorian Nicholson
- Linda L. Richards
- Keith Schengili-Roberts
- David Tanaka (Editor-in-Chief)
- Geof Wheelwright
- Rod Lamirand

== Sample Issues ==
The Computer Paper Online Edition via the waybackmachine.org

- November 1996
- December 1996
- January 1997
- February 1997
- March 1997
- July 1997
- November 1997
- January 1998
- July 1998
- June 1999
- "The Computer Paper" sample PDFs on Issuu.com
- "The Computer Paper" full PDF issues on Archive.org
