= William M. Folger =

United States Navy admiral (1844–1928)

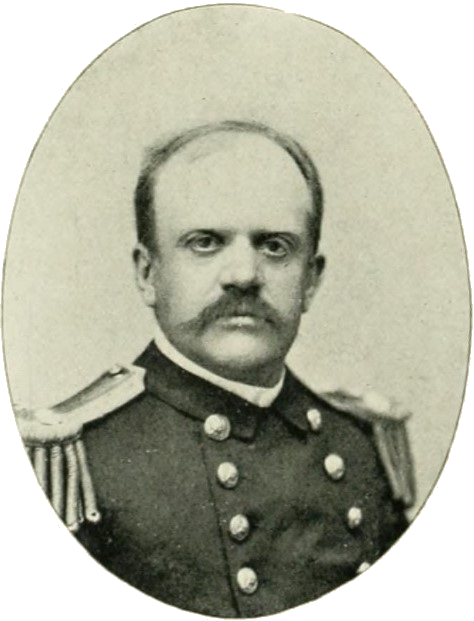
- Folger as a Navy commander circa 1892
- Born: 19 May 1844; Massillon, Ohio, U.S.
- Died: 22 July 1928 (aged 84); Cornish, New Hampshire, U.S.
- Burial place: Mount Auburn Cemetery, Cambridge and Watertown, Massachusetts
- Relatives: Mayhew Folger (1774–1828) (grandfather)
- Military career
- Allegiance: United States of America
- Branch: United States Navy
- Service years: 1864–1905
- Rank: Rear admiral
- Commands: USS Quinnebaug; Bureau of Ordnance; USS Yorktown; USS New Orleans; USS Kearsarge; Philippine Squadron, Asiatic Fleet; Cruiser Squadron, Asiatic Fleet; United States Asiatic Fleet
- Conflicts: American Civil War; Spanish–American War; Philippine–American War

Rear Admiral William Mayhew Folger (19 May 1844 – 22 July 1928) was an officer in the United States Navy. He served in the American Civil War without seeing action. He filled a wide range of roles, including Chief of the Bureau of Ordnance, over the following 30 years. He fought in the Spanish–American War as captain of the protected cruiser USS New Orleans. Folger served as a lighthouse inspector before becoming commander of the Philippine Squadron during the Philippine–American War, and was briefly Commander-in-Chief of the United States Asiatic Fleet. He retired in 1905 as a rear admiral.

== Naval career ==
=== Early career ===
Folger was born in Massillon, Ohio, on 19 May 1844, the son of Robert H. Folger, grandson of the famed whaling captain Mayhew Folger, and descendant of Peter Foulger and Mary Morrill Foulger. He was appointed a midshipman from Ohio on 21 September 1861, shortly after the April 1861 outbreak of the American Civil War. He entered the United States Naval Academy, which moved from Annapolis, Maryland, to Newport, Rhode Island, (Note: The Naval Academy was located at 141 Pelham St, Newport which is the current location of the Elks Lodge, across Bellevue Avenue from the Newport Art Museum.) for the duration of the war, as a member of the class of 1865. He graduated early from the academy, on 22 November 1864, because of the pressing need for officers in the greatly expanded wartime U.S. Navy, and reported for duty on 6 February 1865 aboard the receiving ship USS North Carolina at the New York Navy Yard in Brooklyn, New York. He then served on the training ship USS Sabine, (Note: Sabine had detached from blockade duty with the North Atlantic Blockading Squadron until ordered in August 1864 to Norfolk, Virginia as a training ship for Navy apprentices and landsmen.) where he remained through the end of the war in April 1865 and until 25 July 1865.

=== USS Hartford and USS Franklin ===
Folger served aboard the flagship of the Asiatic Squadron, the sloop-of-war USS Hartford, from 25 July 1865 to 6 August 1868, (Note: She had returned to New York on 13 December to enter the yards for maintenance and repairs to battle damage from her service on the Gulf Coast. At that time ships were decommissioned while in the shipyard. She was recommissioned in July 1865 to serve as flagship of a newly organized Asiatic Squadron until August 1868.) and while aboard was commissioned as an ensign on 1 November 1866 and promoted to master on 1 December 1866 and to lieutenant on 12 March 1868. After leaving Hartford, he had duty at the Norfolk Navy Yard in Portsmouth, Virginia, for a time in 1868 before reporting aboard the screw frigate USS Franklin, the flagship of the European Squadron, in October 1868. He was promoted to lieutenant commander on 27 April 1869 while aboard Franklin. He served on the staff of the European Squadron during 1872.

Folger had ordnance duty from 1873 to 1874, then took leave to travel in Europe from 1875 to 1876. He reported for duty aboard the screw sloop-of-war USS Marion in the European Squadron in 1877, then transferred to the staff of the U.S. Naval Academy for duty from 1877 to 1879. He was aboard the screw sloop-of-war USS Swatara in the Asiatic Squadron from 1879 to 1882, then served in the Bureau of Ordnance in 1882 before performing ordnance duty at Annapolis, Maryland, from 1882 to 1885. He was promoted to commander on 1 March 1885.

=== Commodore and captain ===
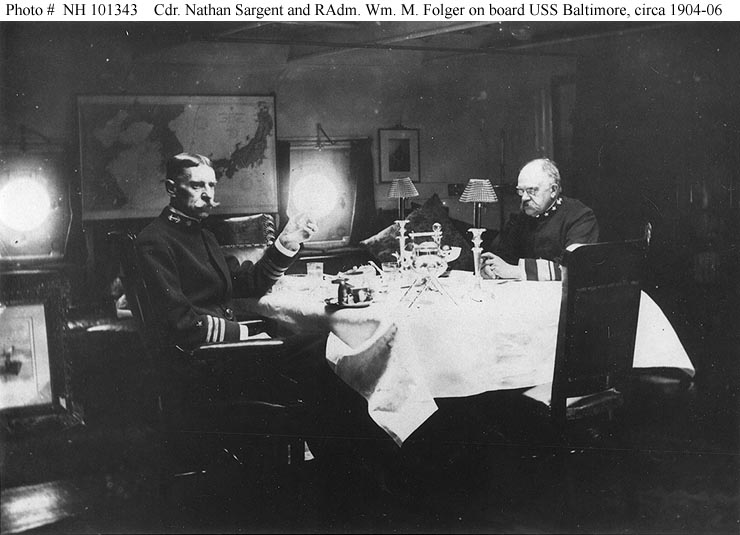
Folger (right) as a rear admiral in the flag cabin of the protected cruiser USS Baltimore while serving as Commander, Cruiser Squadron, United States Asiatic Fleet, c. 1904–1905. Baltimore's commanding officer, Commander Nathan Sergeant, is at left.

Folger returned to sea as the commanding officer of the screw corvette USS Quinnebaug in the European Squadron. He then was Inspector of Ordnance at the Washington Navy Yard in Washington, D.C., from 1888 to 1890, and from February 1890 to January 1893 was Chief of the Bureau of Ordnance with the temporary rank of commodore. He commanded the gunboat USS Yorktown in operations in the Bering Sea and in the Asiatic Squadron from 1894 to 1895. He was a lighthouse inspector from 1896 to 1897, and was promoted to captain on 6 February 1898.

=== Spanish–American War ===
At the outbreak of the Spanish–American War in April 1898, Folger took command of the protected cruiser USS New Orleans in the North Atlantic Squadron, leading her through the end of war in August 1898, seeing service in the Flying Squadron off Cuba and in bombardments of Santiago de Cuba on 6 and 16 June 1898. He detached from New Orleans in February 1899, and then was commander of the Philippine Squadron of the Asiatic Squadron from April to September 1899, during which time the squadron saw action in the Philippine–American War. He next was general inspector on the new battleship USS Kearsarge, still fitting out prior to commissioning, and became her first commanding officer when she was commissioned on 20 February 1900. He detached from Kearsarge in May 1901 and again became a lighthouse inspector, carrying out this duty in the Third District until late 1903 or early in 1904.

Folger became commander of the Philippine Squadron of the United States Asiatic Fleet in early 1904 and was soon promoted to rear admiral, on 1 June 1904. Later in 1904, he took command of the fleet's Cruiser Squadron. He served briefly as commander-in-Chief of the Asiatic Fleet from 23 March 1905 to 30 March 1905.

Folger retired from the Navy on 30 June 1905.

== Personal life ==
Folger was an Original Companion of the Military Order of the Loyal Legion of the United States. In 1898 he became a Veteran Companion of the Pennsylvania Commandery of the Military Order of Foreign Wars.

Folger House, his home of many years in Cornish, New Hampshire, is on the National Register of Historic Places in the United States.

== Death ==
Folger died in Cornish on the evening of Sunday, 22 July 1928, after an illness of three weeks. He is buried at Mount Auburn Cemetery in Cambridge and Watertown, Massachusetts.

== Military offices ==
Military offices
Preceded by Yates Stirling	Commander-in-Chief, United States Asiatic Fleet; 23 March 1905 – 30 March 1905	Succeeded by Charles J. Train
