= Tuslaw High School =

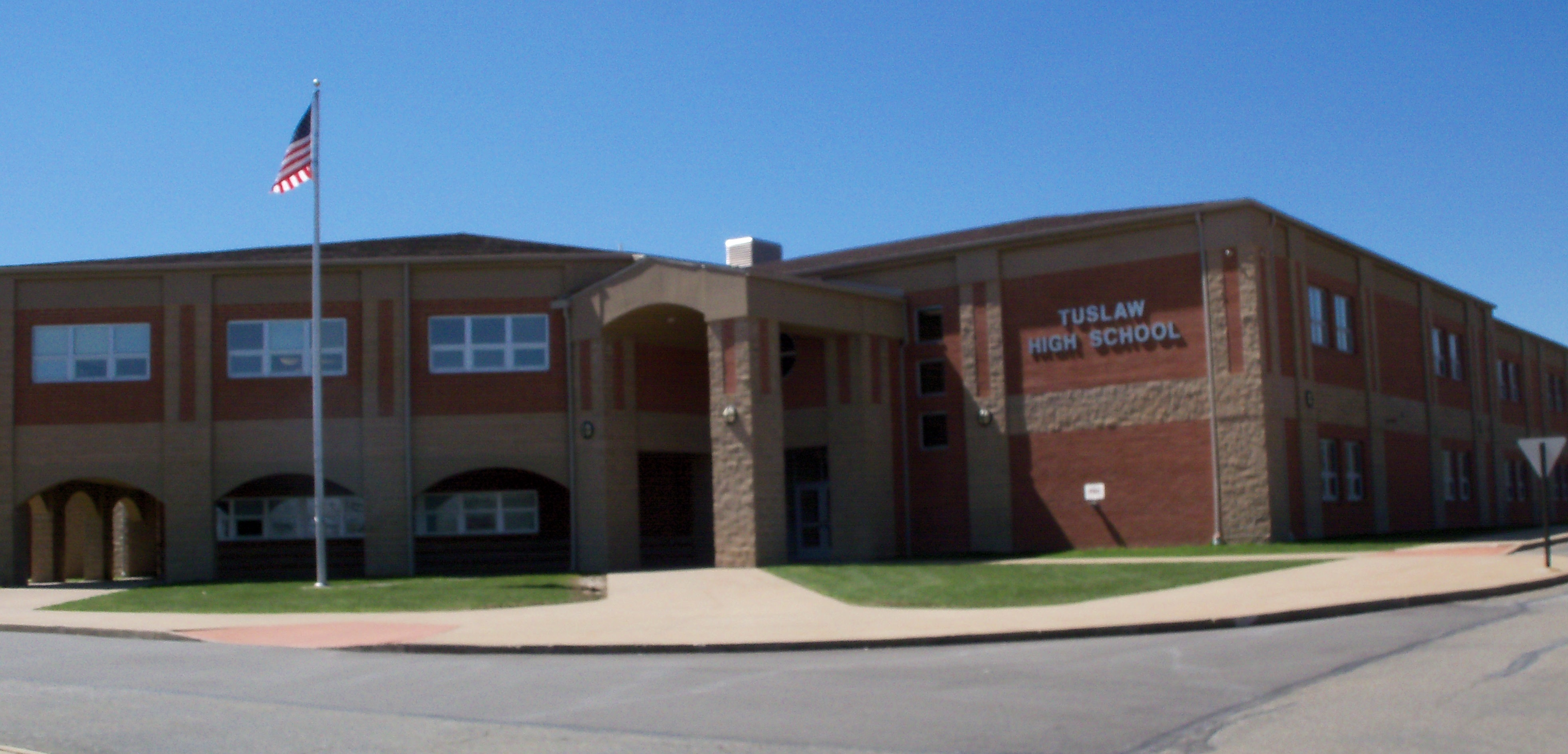

Location
- 1835 Manchester Avenue NW; Massillon, Ohio 44647; United States; 40°48′29″N 81°36′07″W

Information
- School type: Public
- Motto: "We are lifelong learners serving lifelong learners."
- School district: Tuslaw Local School District
- Superintendent: Adam McKenzie
- NCES School ID: 390499503776
- Principal: Jamie Dubsky
- Faculty: 21.10
- Grades: 9–12
- Enrollment: 368 (2024–25)
- Student to teacher ratio: 17.44
- Colors: Blue, white, and red
- Athletics conference: Principals Athletic Conference
- Team name: Mustangs
- Rival: Fairless Falcons
- Website: www.tuslawschools.org

Tuslaw High School (THS) is a public high school located in Tuscarawas Township, Ohio, near the city of Massillon, and serves all high school students in the Tuslaw Local School District. Tuslaw High School is a member of the Stark County Area Vocational School District allowing its high school students to attend the R.G. Drage Vocational Center in Massillon. The school's athletic teams are known as the Mustangs and the school colors are blue and white with red trim.

The original high school was built in 1960 with 9th through 11th grades attending. Prior to that, district high school students attended Northwest High School near Canal Fulton or Washington High School in Massillon. Voters passed a levy in 2002 to construct a new high school next to the original school, converting the old high school into a middle school.

== Notable alumni ==
- Ryan Travis, college football player
