= Travis Ryan =

Travis Ryan may refer to:

- Travis Ryan (musician) (born 1983), American Christian musician
- Travis Ryan, lead vocalist of American band Cattle Decapitation

== See also ==
- Ryan Travis (born 1989), American football fullback
