= Kendal, Ohio =

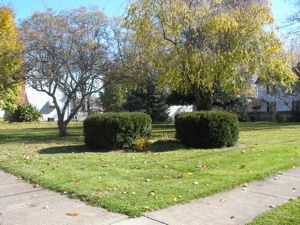
Kendal's original burying ground was partially developed into residential lots. Some bodies were removed to other cemeteries and others were not. The area left undisturbed is now known as Memorial Park.

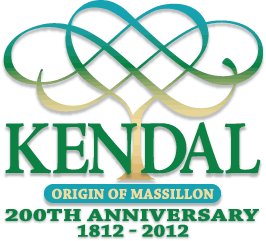
Kendal's 200th anniversary was celebrated in 2012

The plat for the town of Kendal, in Stark County, Ohio was entered on April 20, 1812. It was named by its founder, Thomas Rotch (1767–1823), after the town of Kendal, in Cumbria, England. Kendal was absorbed into the town of Massillon, Ohio in 1853.

== History ==
Thomas and Charity Rotch migrated to Ohio from Hartford, Connecticut in 1811, bringing with them over 400 head of merino sheep. Thomas intended to create a manufacturing town with a woolen factory as a primary industry. They settled in the western part of Stark County near the Tuscarawas River and along a stream known as Sippo Creek. The Rotches were both from respected Massachusetts Quaker lineage and several New England families who followed them to their new settlement.

On April 20, 1812, Thomas Rotch entered a plat for the town of Kendal. He named it in honor of a town of the same name in England's Lake District for its significance to the Society of Friends and its renowned textile industry. It was oriented in the cardinal directions (due north, south, east, and west) and made up of 102 lots and two greens. In April 1813, United States Postmaster General Gideon Granger, granted a post office to Kendal, with Rotch as the postmaster. In 1815, Rotch expanded the town with an addition of 45 lots. Between the years 1813 and 1823, Kendal grew to include a sawmill, woolen factory, pottery, general store, a brickyard, tannery, grist mill, powder mill, blacksmith shop, and Quaker Meeting House.

Among Kendal's Quaker residents were a former ship captain Mayhew Folger and family. Folger's sister, Anna, and her husband Thomas Coffin also intended to settle in Kendal. The Coffins were the parents of Lucretia Coffin Mott. Thomas Coffin visited Kendal in the fall of 1812, and in partnership with Mayhew Folger, signed contracts with a local resident to plant 50 acres of wheat. Coffin returned to his home in Philadelphia and died in 1815 before making the move to Kendal.

=== Friendly Association for Mutual Interest at Kendal ===
Thomas Rotch died in September 1823 and Charity died less than a year later. In June 1826, the Rotches' executor, Arvine Wales (1785–1854), arranged for the sale of the following property to an Owenite society known as the Friendly Association for Mutual Interest:

"2103 acres of land and 50 lots in the town of Kendal which included a sawmill, woolen factory and one unimproved mill seat of 7 feet fall, a good brick house, buildings for a pottery establishment, one two-story house in Kendal more 150 acres improved near 100 more grubbed and one good frame house and barn, two cabin houses, one small frame house"

The trustees for the group, also known as the Kendal Community, signed a three-year mortgage for $20,000, for which they paid a $5,950 deposit. Ultimately weakened by debt and discord, the group disbanded in 1829 and its assets in Kendal were sold.

=== Absorption into Massillon ===
Plans for the Ohio and Erie Canal encouraged investors to establish the town of Massillon in 1826 - immediately southwest of Kendal, along the proposed canal route and Tuscarawas River. Massillon grew quickly, and the post office was transferred there in 1829. In 1853, Kendal was absorbed into Massillon as part of its village incorporation.
