= Dear Mother and All =

Dear Mother and All is a play written by American playwright Sandra Perlman. It is based on letters between 18-year-old American Charles Vernon Brown, his family, friends, and other members of his hometown of Massillon, Ohio, dating from his enlistment in the United States Marine Corps in March 1918 during World War I to the return of his body from France in 1921. The play was produced through a grant from the Ohio Arts Council/Ohio Humanities Council Joint Program in 1988 through a commission from the Massillon Museum and was first performed at the Lincoln Theater in Massillon in 1989.

== Synopsis ==
The play takes place between March 1918 and January 1921 and is based on actual letters written by 18-year old Charles Vernon Brown, members of the immediate and extended Brown family, and other friends and acquaintances from the Northeast Ohio city of Massillon. When US President Woodrow Wilson declared war on Germany in 1918 during World War I, Charles Vernon Brown was an 18-year-old high school graduate. He and his friend Chester Potts joined the United States Marine Corps on April 21, 1918 and, after completing training at Marine Corps Recruit Depot Parris Island and Marine Corps Base Quantico, were assigned to France.

The family and friends he left behind wrote to him throughout his brief military life. The title of the play comes from how he would address each of his letters home: "Dear Mother and all". Charles Vernon's mother Lena Brown was the chief correspondent for the letters, which was typical for many families. Charles's father, also named Charles, never wrote his son and appeared to never fully recover from his departure. The Brown family also had three daughters: Dorothy, Ethel, and Helen.

Charles Vernon saw action in the Battle of Saint-Mihiel in mid September 1918. He was wounded October 4, 1918 in the Forest of Argonne during the Meuse-Argonne Offensive. He died from his wounds on October 24. Because of the length of time it took to send and receive letters, Lena Brown received the letter from her son letting her know he was wounded but alive around the date he actually died. She became increasingly anxious as time passed on without any update on his condition, and did not receive the telegram of his death until November 19, eight days after the Armistice. Charles was initially buried in France.

Lena held out hope that their son had, in fact, not been killed when a photo of the grave in France showed the name of "Charles B. Brown" instead of "Charles V. Brown". Three months later, however, uncle Mortimer Duffield, a doctor with the American Expeditionary Forces, was able to confirm that the grave was that of Charles V. Brown when the Browns' home address was listed as the address for dead soldier in question. Charles's body was returned to Massillon on January 12, 1921 and his funeral was held in his home and at the Wesley Methodist Church on January 13.

== Publication and performances ==
Dear Mother and All was commissioned by the Massillon Museum in 1988 and is based on their collection of letters related to Charles Vernon Brown. The collection includes over 200 letters written by over 60 people covering a period of approximately three years. The play was funded by a $9,000 grant from the Ohio Arts Council and Ohio Humanities Council and written by Sandra Perlman of Kent, Ohio. Dear Mother and All debuted in Massillon July 28–30, 1989 at the Lions Lincoln Theater. It was selected as a second-place entry in the first Playwright's Forum at Youngstown State University in 1993 and performed at the university's Spotlight Theater. A monologue from the play was published by Meriwether Publishing in 2001 as part of their Audition Monologs for Student Actors II collection. In December 2013, it was performed in a staged reading at the Erdmann–Zucchero (EZ) Black Box Theatre at Kent State University.

The show is divided into two acts with 31 total scenes and a performance time of approximately 120 minutes. Action takes place at the Brown home in Massillon and wherever Charles Vernon is writing from at the time. The cast has 22 roles, 11 male and 11 female. While it is not a musical, period background music is suggested as an element, and the script is written to accommodate music.
