= Stanley Macomber =

Stanley Macomber (November 26, 1887 – May 15, 1967) was an American inventor. He designed and patented the open web joist floor system, and founded the Massillon Steel Joist Company of Massillon, Ohio, and the Macomber Steel Company of Canton, Ohio.

Macomber was born in Ida Grove, Iowa, and was educated at the Annapolis Naval Preparatory Academy and Iowa State College. He was inducted into the National Inventors Hall of Fame in 2011.
