= Mayhew Folger =

American whaler

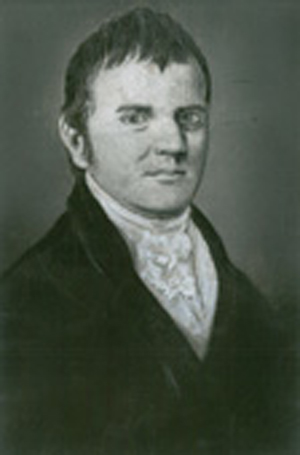
Painting of Mayhew Folger. Original in the collection of the Massillon Museum, Massillon, Ohio.

Mayhew Folger (March 9, 1774 – September 1, 1828) was an American whaler who captained the sealing ship Topaz that rediscovered the Pitcairn Islands in 1808, whilst one of HMS Bounty's mutineers was still living.

== Early life and family ==
Mayhew was born on March 12, 1774, in Nantucket, Massachusetts, the second child of William Folger and Ruth Coffin. Mayhew was a member of the Folger whaling family of Nantucket, who were prominent Quakers. He was the great-great-great grandson of Peter Foulger and Mary Morrill Foulger and, through them, is the first cousin, three times removed, of Benjamin Franklin.

He married his second cousin, Mary Joy, on March 7, 1798, on Nantucket. Mayhew was the uncle of Lucretia Coffin Mott, daughter of his sister, Anna Folger, and Thomas Coffin. Folger's grandson, William Mayhew Folger (1844-1928), became a United States Navy rear admiral.

== Rediscovery of the Pitcairn Islands ==
Mayhew Folger captained the ship Topaz that left Boston on April 5, 1807, hunting for seals. They rediscovered the Pitcairn Islands on February 6, 1808. At that time, only one of the original HMS Bounty mutineers, Alexander Smith, whose real name was John Adams, was still alive. Topaz remained at the island for only ten hours.

== The Bounty's Chronometer ==
Captain Folger was given the Bounty's azimuth compass and Larcum Kendall K2 marine chronometer by Adams. The K2 was the third precision marine chronometer made after the H4, designed by John Harrison. The chronometer was taken by the Spanish governor at Juan Fernandez Island. The chronometer was later purchased by a Spaniard named Castillo. When he died, his family conveyed it to Captain Herbert of HMS Calliope, who had it conveyed to the British Museum around 1840. The chronometer is now in Greenwich, London.

== Accounts of the rediscovery ==
The discovery was reported by Folger to the Royal Navy in 1808, a report of which reached the British Admiralty on May 14, 1809, which was then published in the Quarterly Review in 1810. Captain Folger also related an account of the discovery to a friend, Captain Amasa Delano, who published it in his book, A Narrative of Voyages and Travels in 1817; the narrative is also included in the book Pitcairn's Island, written by Charles Nordoff and James Hall.

== Later years ==
Folger and his family migrated to Kendal, Ohio, in 1813. He was a principal member of the Kendal Preparative Meeting of the Society of Friends (or Quakers), the first religious society organized west of Canton in Stark County. Their Monthly Meeting was held at Marlboro, Quarterly Meeting at Salem, and Yearly Meeting at Mount Pleasant, Jefferson County. It is supposed that all of these Meetings existed as early as 1813. Other principal members of the Kendal Preparative Meeting were Isaac Bowman, Richard Williams, Zaccheus Stanton, Charles Coffin, Thomas Coffin (a brother-in-law of Mayhew Folger), Mathew Macy (a brother-in-law of Thomas Coffin), Micajah Macy, Thomas Rotch, Joseph Hobson, and Jonathan Michener. The influence of this Quaker meeting strongly impacted the community and its later participation in the underground railroad network.

Folger became the first postmaster of neighboring Massillon, Ohio, when the post office was created there in 1828. He died September 1, 1828, in Massillon.

== See also ==
- History of the Pitcairn Islands
- A quote about the Folger family from Herman Melville is in the entry for Mary Morrill.
