= Tuslaw Local School District =

School district in Ohio, United States

Address
- 1835 Manchester Avenue Northwest Massillon, Ohio, 44647; United States

District information
- Type: Public
- Grades: KG–12
- Schools: 3
- NCES District ID: 3904995

Students and staff
- Students: 1,282 (2025–2026)
- Teachers: 65.70 (on an FTE basis) (2025–2026)
- Staff: 226.98 (on an FTE basis) (2025–2026)
- Student–teacher ratio: 19.51 (2025–2026)

Other information
- Website: www.tuslawschools.org

Tuslaw Local Schools is a public school district located in Stark County, Ohio, United States and serves most of Tuscarawas Township, the southern half of Lawrence Township, and western portions of the City of Massillon.

== History ==
The school district was formed in 1965, consolidating four rural districts Moffit, Beech Grove, North Lawrence, and Newman. Prior to the district's formation, students in these outlying areas would attend high school in Massillon. The Tuslaw School District was named for the two townships in which the district resides. Tuslaw High School was constructed one mile north of then US 30 Lincoln Highway (currently SR-172) along SR-93 in Tuscarawas, Township. The district maintained the original four district buildings as K-8, with high school students attending Tuslaw High School. The district was reconfigured over time as the district enrollment grew.

Voters passed a levy in 2002 to construct a new high school next to the original building, converting the old high school into a middle school. A new central elementary school was constructed in 2010 across from the new high school on SR-93, replacing the district's four small aging elementary school buildings.
