= Spring Hill Historic Home =

Historic site of Underground Railroad

- U.S. National Register of Historic Places
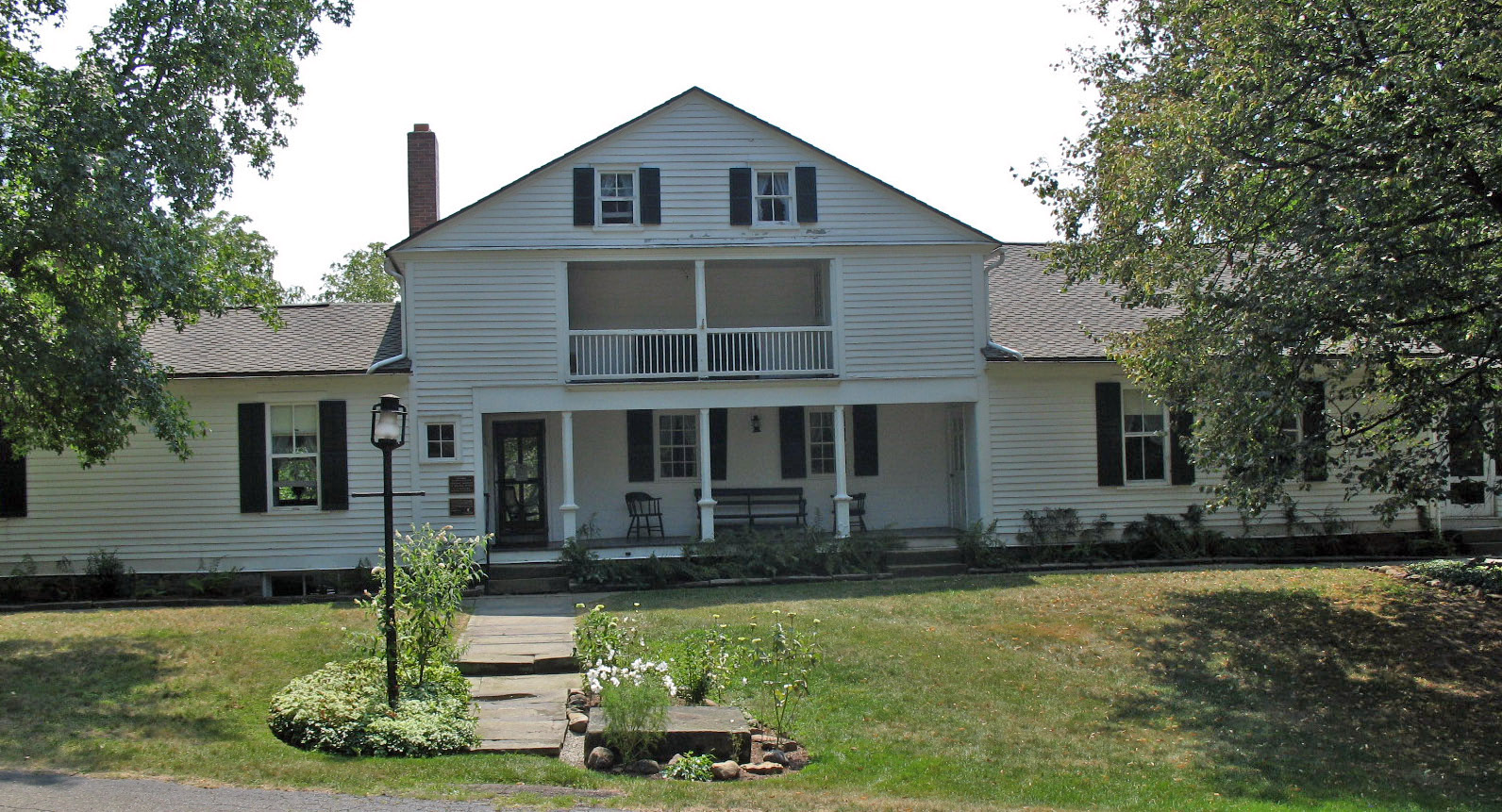
- An image of the main home at Spring Hill.

- Location within Ohio Location within the United States
- Interactive map showing the location for Spring Hill Historic Home
- Location: 1401 Springhill Lane NE Massillon, Ohio 44646
- Coordinates: 40°48′44″N 81°30′22″W
- Built: 1821-1824
- Architect: Jehial Fox
- NRHP reference No.: 72001045
- Added to NRHP: April 14, 1972

Spring Hill is a historic home museum in Massillon, Ohio. The estate was settled and started by Thomas and Charity Rotch, and it was eventually owned by the Wales family for three generations. Spring Hill is recognized on the National Park Service Underground Railroad Network to Freedom. The estate encompasses the main house and several outbuildings, including a smokehouse, spring house, milk house, and wool house

== History ==
=== Background ===
Thomas and Charity Rotch, originally from New Bedford, Massachusetts, traveled westward in January 1811, looking for a place to settle and create a homestead. The Rotches moved westward at the suggestion of Dr. Benjamin Rush. Charity Rotch had frequent fevers and was looking for a milder climate. Thomas Rotch, a Quaker, involved in the wool industry, needed a location where his sheep could graze and where the wool could be easily transported. Upon meeting friendly Quakers in the town of Steubenville, Ohio, the Rotches were given good reports of the area around Sippo Creek. Thomas decided to move his family to this area for fresh water and the cleared land around the creek. Along the way, Thomas Rotch met Arvine Wales, who would become a dear friend to the family. He would eventually purchase Spring Hill after the passing of both Thomas and Charity Rotch. The family would remain at Spring Hill until 1966, when the estate was turned into a museum.

Upon settling in the area, Thomas and Charity Rotch started laying out the homestead and named it Kendal, after a textile center in England. Rotch laid out streets and squares, recreating a collection of homes and businesses that resembled a New England town. Many of those early settlers who settled down in the new village of Kendal were fellow Quakers. The town was officially founded on April 20, 1812. By 1817, the town of Kendal was growing, with over 100 plats of land being settled. Being a community of mostly Quakers, the area was also staunchly abolitionist. Routes and stops on the Underground Railroad went through Kendal as early as 1817. Between 1821 and 1865, no slaves were ever caught while being kept safe at Spring Hill.

=== Construction of Spring Hill ===
Spring Hill was built between 1821 and 1824 by architect Jehial Fox. The main house at Spring Hill is 80 feet long. Jehial Fox built the homestead with various materials, such as stone, brick, and oak planks. Some of the oak planks are large, with some pieces being as large as 28 feet long. The house initially used a Franklin stove. This fireplace was updated in 1831 by Arvine Wales, who converted the stove into a fireplace. Arvine Wales also made most of the changes to the original estate. Some of his additional changes included adding a western wing to the house. The Wales family also added a small bathroom to a bedroom on the second floor. Also, by adding a wall to the parlor on the first floor, the Wales family could create another bathroom. Finally, by changing the walls around the kitchen and the dining room, a breakfast room and a kitchen on the first floor could be created. Initially, the kitchen was downstairs, and either staff or family used a dumb waiter to transport food up and down. However, this was removed and is no longer seen. In 1920, a second edition was added to the western wing of the house by adding a screened-in porch. This addition was the last major renovation that would take place at Spring Hill as a family residence.

=== The Staircase ===
The Spring Hill home is primarily known for its secret staircase, a feature that allowed escaped slaves using the Underground Railroad to safely pass through the area on their route. Fox placed this staircase at the center of the house, probably initially intended for use by domestic staff. With the move of the kitchen, however, the staircase was no longer used by waitstaff. However, this staircase was used by runaway slaves to hide in as early as 1821. Escaped slaves took this staircase down to the basement, where they safely hid before continuing on their journey.

After the deaths of Thomas Rotch in 1823 and Charity Rotch in 1824, the Wales family continued harboring and protecting runaway slaves.

=== Outbuildings ===
Spring Hill was built to be an operational homestead. Many service buildings were built on-site to be used, and many of them have been restored. The service buildings include a carriage house, smokehouse, dog kennel, spring house, milk house, grain barn, and wool house. One of the larger outbuildings, the carriage house, has a room above it where hired farmhands could stay while working at Spring Hill. These buildings were used to support Spring Hill and the local Kendal community.
