= Massillon, Ohio =

- City
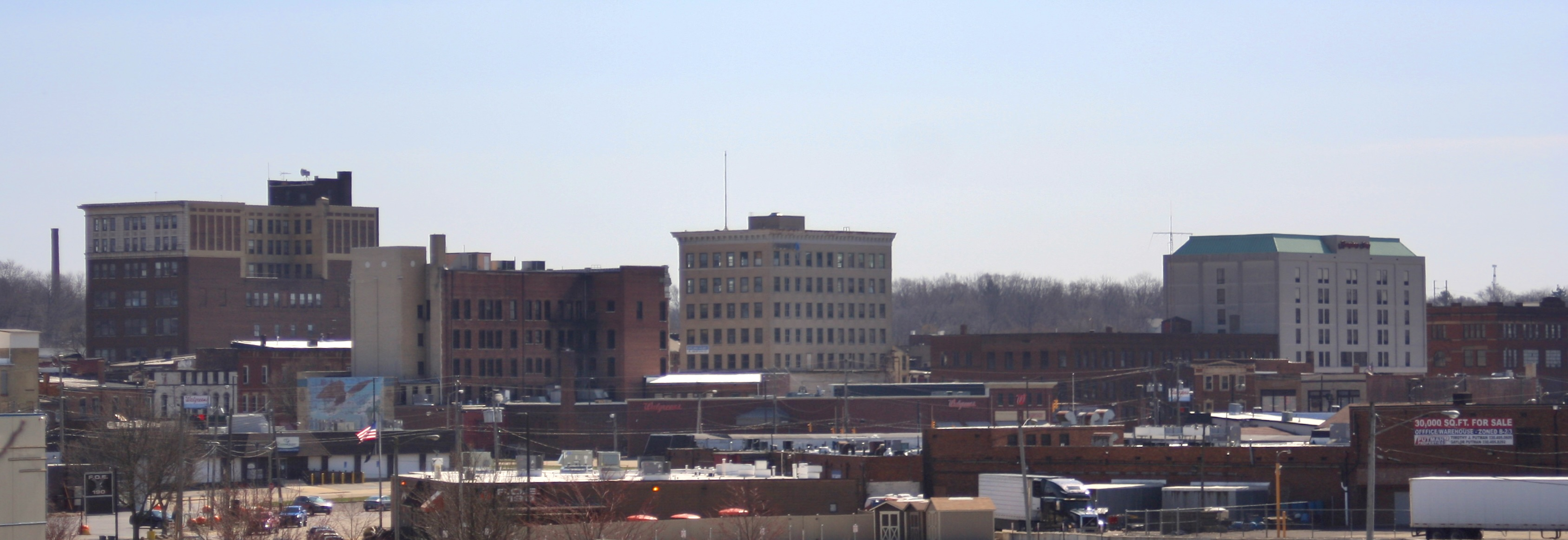
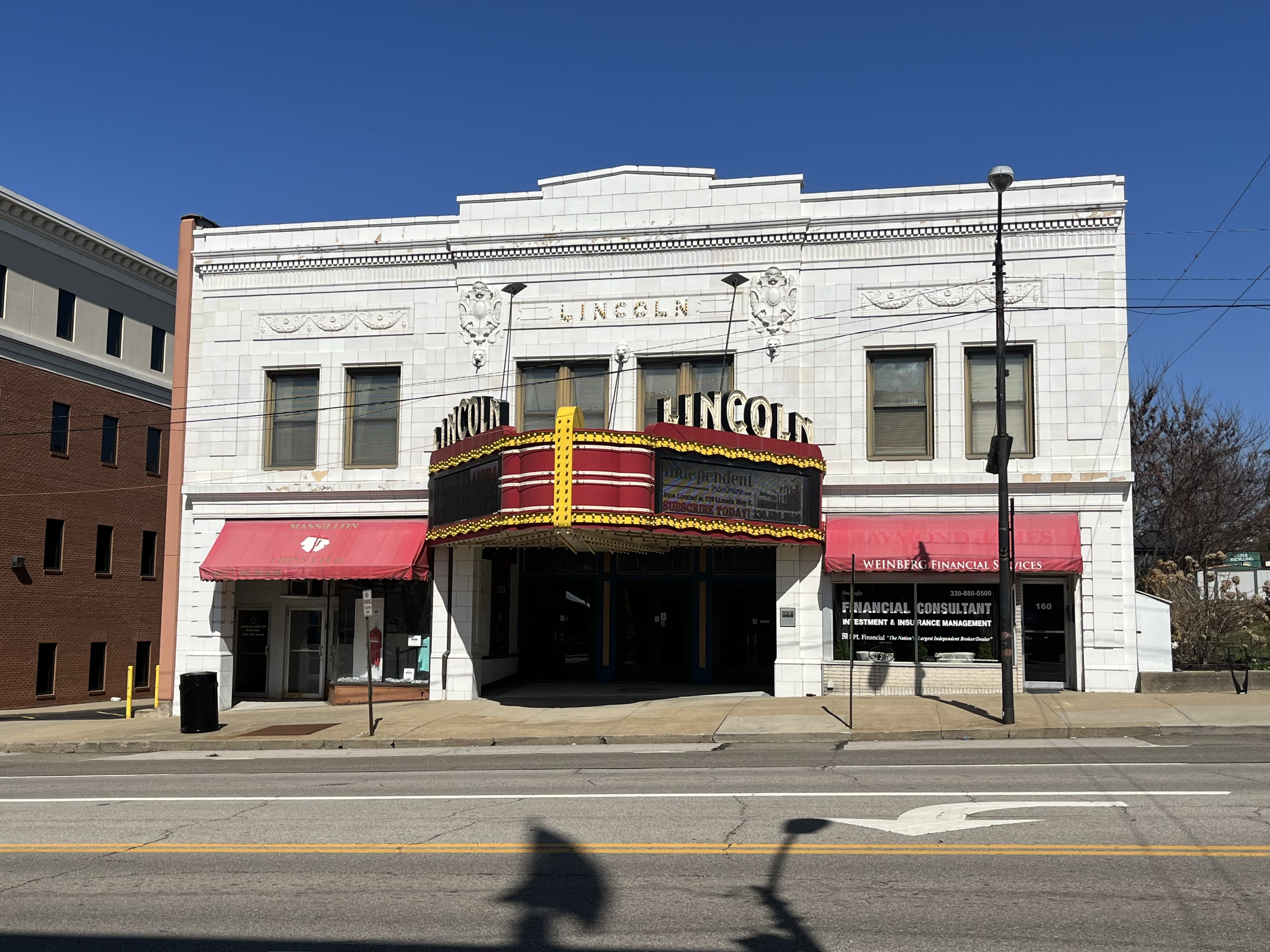
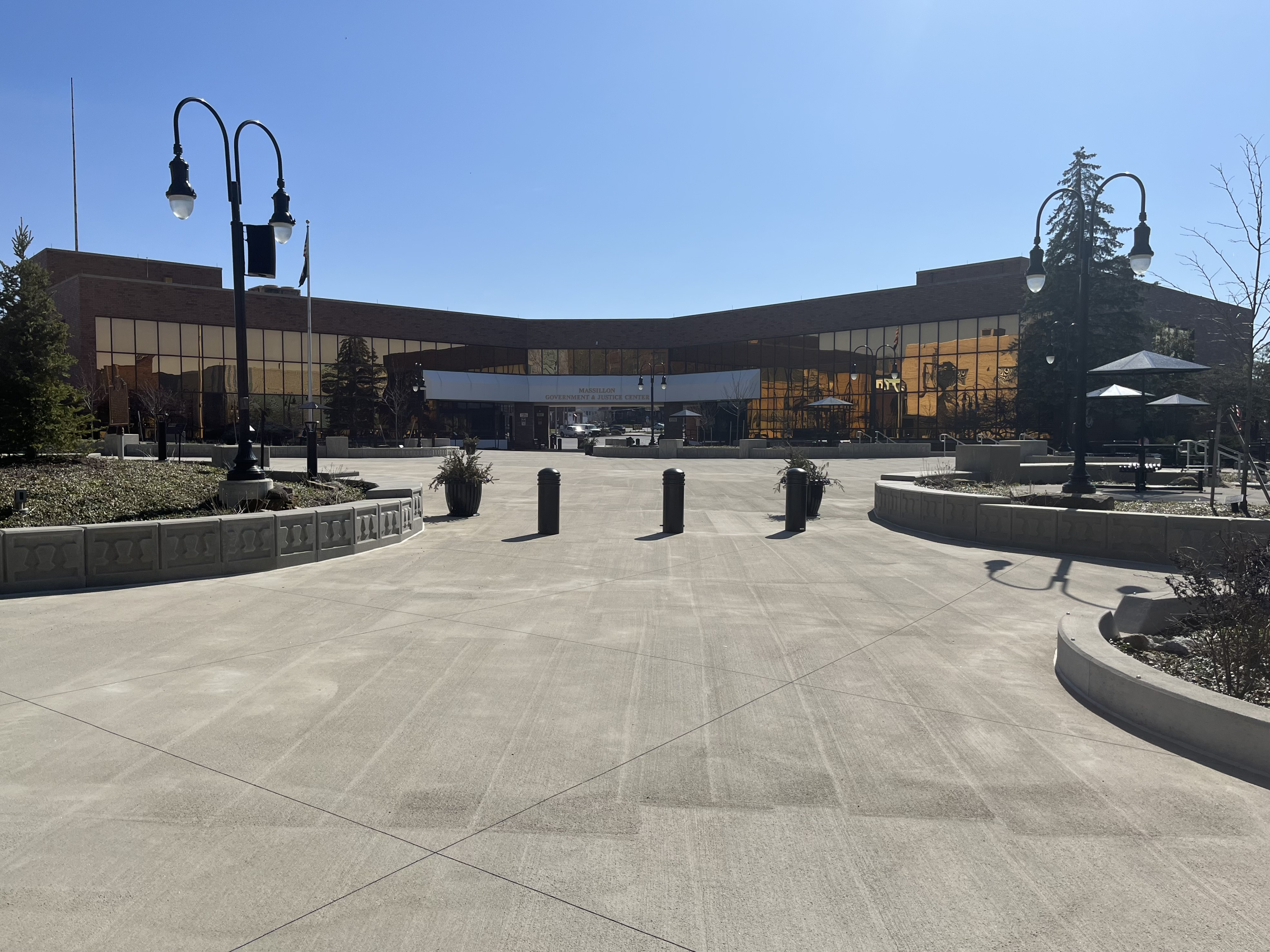
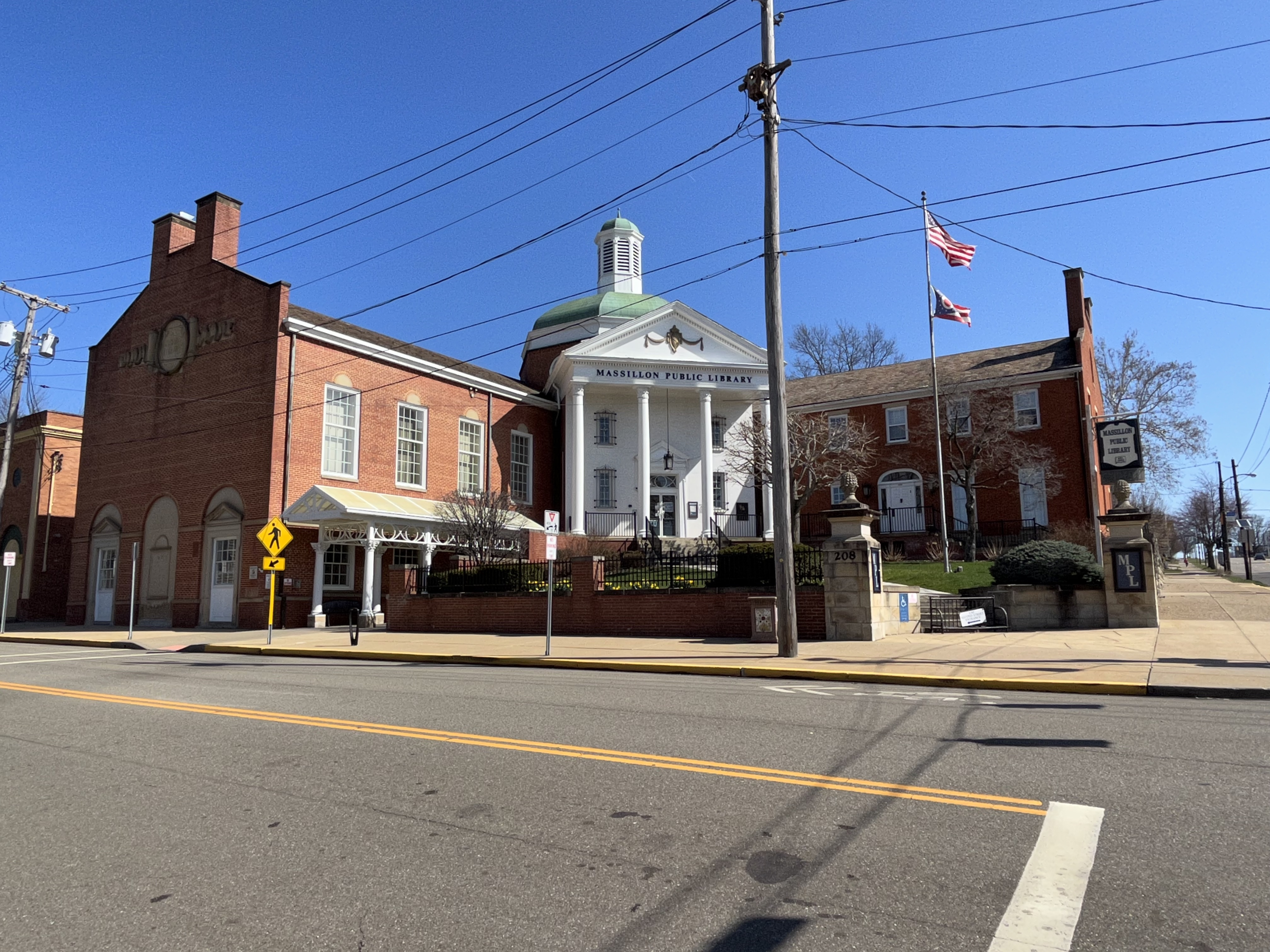
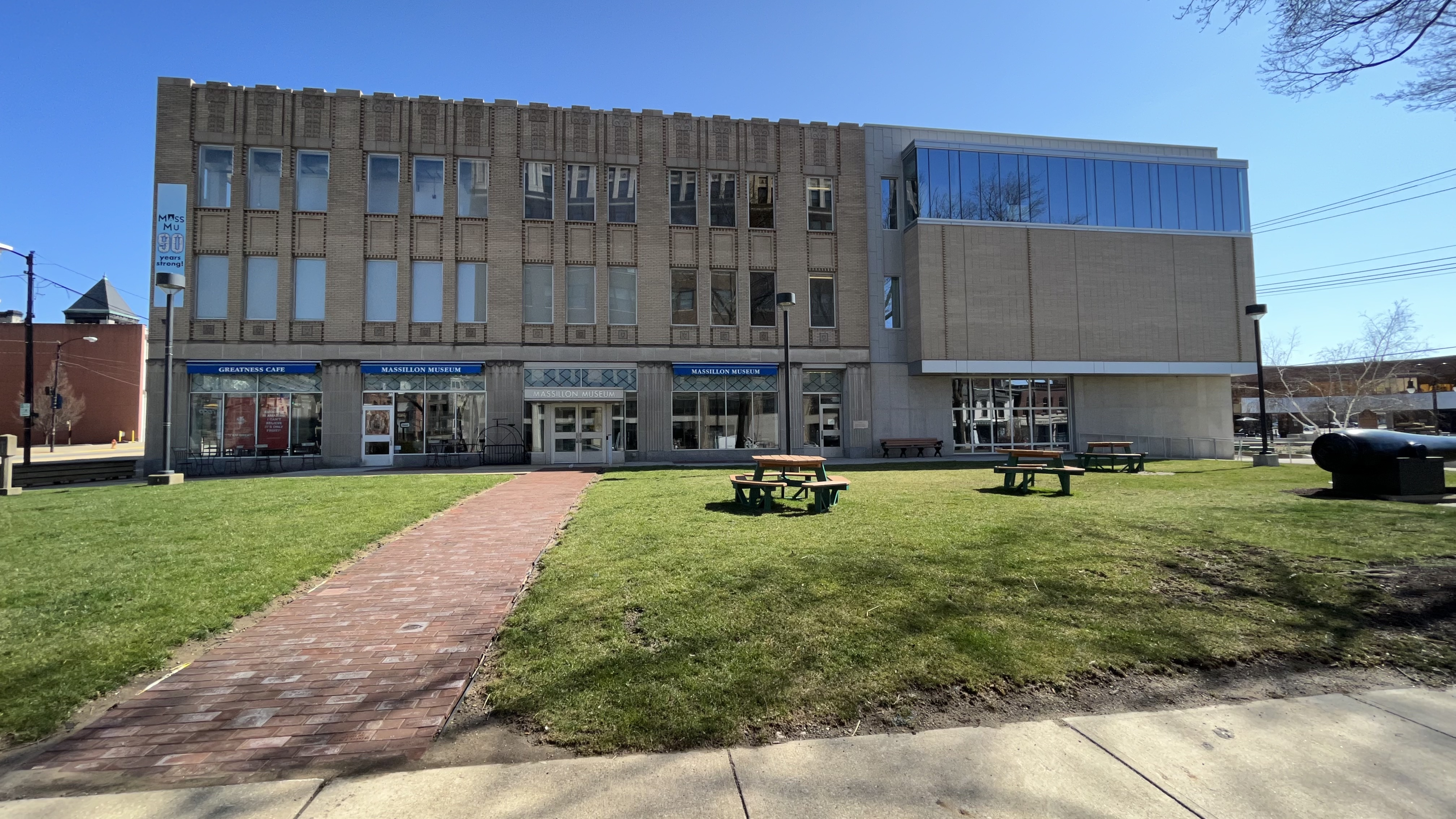
- Downtown Massillon Lions Lincoln Theatre Massillon Government & Justice Center Massillon Public Library Massillon Museum

- Seal
- Nickname: Tiger Town
- Motto: City of Champions
- Interactive map of Massillon, Ohio
- Location within Ohio Location within the United States
- Coordinates: 40°47′08″N 81°31′31″W
- Country: United States
- State: Ohio
- County: Stark
- Incorporated: 1868

Government
  - Type: Mayor-Council

Area
  - Total: 19.15 sq mi (49.60 km^{2})
  - Land: 18.97 sq mi (49.13 km^{2})
  - Water: 0.18 sq mi (0.47 km^{2})
- Elevation: 984 ft (300 m)

Population (2020)
  - Total: 32,146
  - Density: 1,694.7/sq mi (654.32/km^{2})
- Time zone: UTC-5 (Eastern (EST))
  - Summer (DST): UTC-4 (EDT)
- ZIP codes: 44646-44648
- Area code: 330
- FIPS code: 39-48244
- GNIS feature ID: 1086982
- Website: massillonohio.gov

Massillon (/ˈmæsɪlən/ MASS-ih-lən) is a city in western Stark County, Ohio, United States, along the Tuscarawas River. The population was 32,146 at the 2020 census. Massillon is a principal city of the Canton–Massillon metropolitan area, which includes all of Stark and Carroll counties and had a population of 401,574 in 2020.

Founded in the early 19th century and incorporated in 1853, the city developed as an industrial center due to its location on the Ohio and Erie Canal and later railroad access. Steel and machinery manufacturing played a significant role in the city's economic growth. Massillon is located approximately 8 miles (13 km) west of Canton, 20 miles (32 km) south of Akron, and 50 miles (80 km) south of Cleveland.

== History ==
=== 19th century ===
Ohio and Erie Canal in Massillon at the turn of the century

The original settlement of Kendal was founded in 1812 by Thomas Rotch, a Quaker originally of New Bedford, Massachusetts, and Hartford, Connecticut. James Duncan of New Hampshire first settled in Kendal before recording the plot for Massillon on December 6, 1826. Duncan, known as the city's founder, named the town after Jean-Baptiste Massillon, a French Catholic bishop, at the request of his wife. The town plat was established along the east bank of the Tuscarawas River, which was the surveyed route for the Ohio and Erie Canal being constructed to connect Lake Erie with the Ohio River. The canal section spanning from Cleveland to Massillon was completed in 1828. Among the leading merchants were the Wellman brothers Hiram and Marshall. Marshall Wellman was the grandfather of the American author Jack London. Massillon quickly became a major port town along the canal route, known as the Port of Massillon, following the canal's completion in the 1832. The first telegraph lines would reach Massillon in 1847, and the Ohio & Pennsylvania Railroad would extend its rails to Massillon in 1852. Massillon incorporated as a village in 1853. In 1868, Massillon incorporated as a city when the populated reached 5,000.

The Ohio Women's Convention met at Massillon on May 27, 1852. The president of the convention was Hannah Tracy Cutler. The meeting was held in Massillon Baptist Chapel. Attendees voted to establish the Ohio Women's Rights Association (OWRA), which held its first meeting the following year in Ravenna, Ohio.

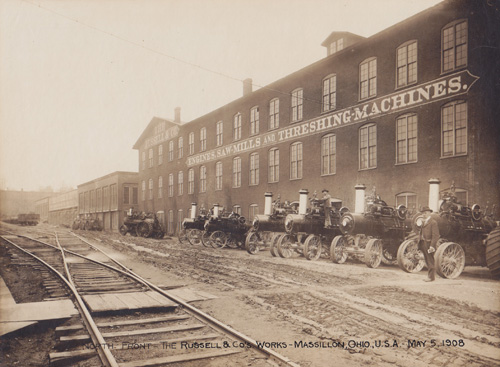
Russell & Company Works (1908)

The C. M. Russell & Company, formed in 1848 by Charles. M. Russell and his brothers, Nahum Russell and Clement Russell, manufactured threshing machines and other agricultural implements in Massillon. The company began producing train cars in 1852 and incorporated in 1864 as Russell & Company Inc. In 1884, Russell & Company began producing its famed steam traction engines and quickly became one of the largest producers of industrial and agricultural equipment. A merger with the Griscom-Spencer company in 1912 created the Griscom-Russell Company. Griscom-Russell produced heat exchangers for the United States Navy during World War II. The company closed in 1962.

The Massillon Iron Bridge Company was founded by Joseph Davenport in 1869 after moving to Massillon from Boston to work at the C. M. Russell & Company. Davenport also invented and built the first locomotive "cowcatcher" and cab in Massillon. The company incorporated in 1887 as The Massillon Bridge Company. The Massillon Bridge Company designed and built steel truss bridges up through the mid-1900s, many of which stand today.

Massillon State Hospital in early 1900s

The Massillon State Hospital for the Insane opened in 1898 on 240 acres of land given to the state of Ohio for the purpose of constructing the hospital. The hospital was established by Ohio governor William McKinley. By 1950 there were 3,100 patients in the hospital. Today it is known as Heartland Behavioral Healthcare.

=== 20th century ===
The Forest City Motor Company was founded in Cleveland in 1906 but relocated to Massillon that same year. Forest City produced approximately 1,000 of their Jewel automobiles in Massillon between 1906 and 1909. The name of the company was changed to the Jewel Motor Car Company but the company eventually ceased production in 1909.

Although steelmaking and fabrication is found throughout its history, some say Massillon's steel age didn't start until 1909, when the first sheet of steel was rolled at the Massillon Rolling Mill Company. Massillon Rolling merged into the Central Steel Company in 1914, and lit its first open hearth furnace in 1915. Central Steel eventually became known as the Central Alloy Steel Company. In April 1930, Central Alloy merged with Republic Steel, becoming the third largest steel company in the world, with its Massillon operations employing nearly one-half of the city's workforce by 1959. This included other Massillon divisions like Massillon Union Drawn Steel and its stainless steel division Enduro Stainless. In 1984 Republic Steel was purchased by LTV Steel. Enduro closed in 1985, and it and other stainless plants went through several ownership changes over the following 15 years. The main Republic facilities on the southwest side of Massillon closed by 2002.

Stanley Macomber designed the open-web steel joist in 1921 while working for Massillon's Central Steel Company. Macomber left Central Steel and founded the Massillon Steel Joist Co. in 1923. His open-web steel joist, patented in 1924, was known as the Massillon Steel Joist. Macomber's invention was a revolutionary assembly of steel joists with a top slab used to support of floors, ceilings and roofs. The basis of Macomber's steel joist design is still used today. Stanley Macomber was inducted into the Inventors Hall of Fame in 2011.

Lincoln Highway (US-30) looking east into downtown Massillon, 1966

Lincoln Highway, the first U.S. highway to run from coast to coast, was envisioned in 1913 and followed Main Street through the center of Massillon. Main Street was eventually renamed Lincoln Way in recognition of the new highway. In 1928, the federal government renamed Lincoln Highway to U.S. 30. A controlled access freeway was constructed in 1971, bypassing U.S. 30 around to the city's most southern part. The old Lincoln Highway that runs through Massillon and Canton was reassigned as State Route 172.

Massillon was a site where one of the most tragic instances of anti-union violence in the history of the United States occurred, during the Little Steel strike of 1937. The Steel Workers Organizing Committee began an attempt to organize workers at Republic Steel in the spring of 1937, following the unionizing of workers at the country's two largest steel companies US Steel and Jones & Laughlin Steel. In retaliation, Republic Steel expelled over 1000 union supporters at plants in Canton and Massillon. On May 26, the union eventually called for all workers at Republic Steel, Youngstown Sheet and Tube, and Inland Steel (together known as Little Steel) to strike in response to the treatment of workers in Massillon and Canton. On the night of July 11, 1937, a car failed to dim its headlights as it approached a police barricade near a picket line at one of the Massillon plants. City police assumed the worst and without warning opened fire with rifles and shotguns. Police then used this infraction to raid a peaceful crowd that was gathered in front of the union headquarters. Police pumped tear gas canisters and opened fire into the fleeing crowd. Joined by National Guardsmen, the police destroyed the union hall and arrested every suspected unionist they could find. Three men were killed and hundreds were injured during this incident.

Ohio Historical Marker #18–76 was erected in 2004 in front of the Massillon City Hall in memory of the Little Steel Strike of 1937.

Jacob S. Coxey, Sr., sometimes known as General Coxey of Massillon, was an American politician who ran for elective office several times in Ohio. He twice led Coxey's Army, in 1894 and 1914, consisting of a group of unemployed men that he led on marches from Massillon to Washington, D.C., to present a "Petition in Boots" demanding that the Congress allocate funds to create jobs for the unemployed. Although his march failed, Coxey's Army was an early attempt to arouse political interest in an issue that grew in importance until the Social Security Act of 1935 encouraged the establishment of state unemployment insurance programs. Jacob Coxey was elected mayor of Massillon in 1931 and served one year.

== Geography ==
Massillon is located along the Tuscarawas River. The city's incorporated area primarily resides in the western half of Perry Township, with portions extending north into Jackson Township, west into Tuscarawas Township, and south into Bethlehem Township. The village of Navarre borders the city to the south.

According to the United States Census Bureau, the city has a total area of 18.76 square miles (48.59 km^{2}), of which 18.58 square miles (48.12 km^{2}) is land and 0.18 square miles (0.47 km^{2}) is water.

The following residential neighborhoods are located in and around the city: Amherst Heights, Belmont, C.H.A.R.M, Charity Rotch, Chestnut Hills, Clearview, Colonial Hills, Columbia Heights, East Brookfield, Elms Acres, Greenwood Acres, Kendall Heights, Lawndale, Mayflower Village, Moffitt Heights, New England, Oak Ridge, Perry Heights, Raynell, Sippo Heights, University Village, Walnut Hills, Wellman, West Brookfield, West Park, St. Andrews Golf Estates and Westadaro

== Demographics ==
Historical population
Census	Pop.	Note	%±
1840	1,422		—
1860	3,819		—
1870	5,185		35.8%
1880	6,836		31.8%
1890	10,092		47.6%
1900	11,944		18.4%
1910	10,092		−15.5%
1920	17,428		72.7%
1930	26,400		51.5%
1940	26,644		0.9%
1950	29,594		11.1%
1960	31,236		5.5%
1970	32,539		4.2%
1980	30,557		−6.1%
1990	31,007		1.5%
2000	31,325		1.0%
2010	32,149		2.6%
2020	32,146		0.0%

=== 2020 census ===
As of the 2020 census, Massillon had a population of 32,146. The median age was 41.5 years. 21.3% of residents were under the age of 18 and 20.2% of residents were 65 years of age or older. For every 100 females there were 95.0 males, and for every 100 females age 18 and over there were 91.9 males.

99.6% of residents lived in urban areas, while 0.4% lived in rural areas.

There were 13,625 households in Massillon, of which 26.1% had children under the age of 18 living in them. Of all households, 38.2% were married-couple households, 20.4% were households with a male householder and no spouse or partner present, and 31.8% were households with a female householder and no spouse or partner present. About 33.3% of all households were made up of individuals and 15.0% had someone living alone who was 65 years of age or older.

There were 14,777 housing units, of which 7.8% were vacant. The homeowner vacancy rate was 1.7% and the rental vacancy rate was 7.6%.

Racial composition as of the 2020 census
Race	Number	Percent
White	26,654	82.9%
Black or African American	2,531	7.9%
American Indian and Alaska Native	140	0.4%
Asian	126	0.4%
Native Hawaiian and Other Pacific Islander	8	0.0%
Some other race	480	1.5%
Two or more races	2,207	6.9%
Hispanic or Latino (of any race)	1,146	3.6%

=== 2010 census ===
As of the census of 2010, there were 32,149 people, 13,140 households, and 8,268 families residing in the city. The population density was 1,730.3 inhabitants per square mile (668.1/km^{2}). There were 14,497 housing units at an average density of 780.2 per square mile (301.2/km^{2}). The racial makeup of the city was 87.4% White, 8.8% African American, 0.3% Native American, 0.4% Asian, 0.5% from other races, and 2.6% from two or more races. Hispanic or Latino residents of any race were 2.0% of the population.

There were 13,140 households, of which 29.6% had children under the age of 18 living with them, 42.9% were married couples living together, 14.9% had a female householder with no husband present, 5.1% had a male householder with no wife present, and 37.1% were non-families. 31.1% of all households were made up of individuals, and 13% had someone living alone who was 65 years of age or older. The average household size was 2.37 and the average family size was 2.95.

The median age in the city was 40.1 years. 22.9% of residents were under the age of 18; 8.2% were between the ages of 18 and 24; 24.9% were from 25 to 44; 27.1% were from 45 to 64; and 16.7% were 65 years of age or older. The gender makeup of the city was 48.5% male and 51.5% female.

=== 2000 census ===
As of the census of 2000, there were 31,325 people, 12,677 households, and 8,328 families residing in the city. The population density was 1,870.3 people per square mile (722.1 people/km^{2}). There were 13,567 housing units at an average density of 810.0 per square mile (312.7/km^{2}). The racial makeup of the city was 88.18% White, 9.39% African American, 1.60% from two races or more, 0.96% Hispanic or Latino, 0.34% from other races, 0.25% Asian, and 0.23% Native American.

There were 12,677 households, out of which 29.8% had children under the age of 18 living with them, 47.8% were married couples living together, 13.8% had a female householder with no husband present, and 34.3% were non-families. 29.6% of all households were made up of individuals, and 13.6% had someone living alone who was 65 years of age or older. The average household size was 2.40 and the average family size was 2.96.

In the city the population was spread out, with 25.3% under the age of 18, 7.9% from 18 to 24, 28.1% from 25 to 44, 22.5% from 45 to 64, and 16.1% who were 65 years of age or older. The median age was 38 years. For every 100 females, there were 92.6 males. For every 100 females age 18 and over, there were 85.5 males.

The median income for a household in the city was $32,734, and the median income for a family was $41,058. Males had a median income of $32,021 versus $22,327 for females. The per capita income for the city was $17,633. About 8.3% of families and 10.7% of the population were below the poverty line, including 15.5% of those under age 18 and 7.4% of those age 65 or over.

=== Religion ===
Massilion is home to St. Mary's Catholic Church. It held the US shrine to St. Dymphna until, on August 4, 2015, a fire broke out in the church, ultimately destroying a baptistery and the shrine. The structure of the building survived, but heavy smoke caused much destruction. After closing for cleaning and restoration, St. Mary's reopened on December 25, 2016.

== Economy ==
While no longer home to the large steel plants of the 20th century, the following businesses are headquartered or otherwise prominent in the city:

- Ameri Cold Logistics
- Aqua Ohio (incorporated 1926 as the Massillon Water Service Company)
- A.R.E.
- Campbell Oil (Headquarters)
- Crown Cork & Seal
- Fresh Mark Inc. (Headquarters)
- Greif Brothers
- The Health Plan
- Heinz Frozen Food Co.
- Massillon Cable TV, founded 1965
- Midwestern Industries (Headquarters)
- NFM Welding (Headquarters)
- People's Cartage
- Republic Steel
- R.W. Screw
- Shearer's Foods (manufacturing and headquarters)
- Sugardale (pork products)
- Tower Industries
- King Machine and Tool Company (Est. 1979)

Massillon has a central business district along Lincoln Way stretching from approximately State Route 21 to Wales Road. There are a few shopping areas, notably Towne Plaza, Amherst Shopping Center, Mayflower Shopping Center, Massillon Marketplace and Meadows Plaza.

== Arts and culture ==
=== Museums ===
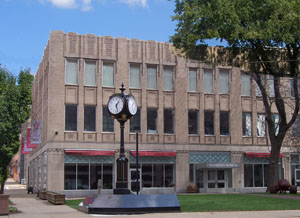
Massillon Museum

The Massillon Museum was established in 1933 in order to preserve the city's rich history. The museum was accredited in 1972 by the American Alliance of Museums and is currently located downtown in the historic Gensemer Brothers Dry Goods building. The museum's collection encompasses approximately 100,000 objects in 94 categories, 60,000 photographs, and 18,000 archival and reference documents. The Immel Circus is one of the museum's most interesting collections. The 100-square foot miniature circus contains 2,620 pieces: thirty-six elephants, 186 horses, 102 assorted animals, ninety-one wagons, seven tents, and 2,207 people. Most of the pieces were hand-carved by Dr. Robert Immel of Massillon using tools from his dental practice.

Spring Hill Historic Home is the home of Thomas and Charity Rotch, the founders of Kendal, Ohio (the precursor to Massillon). In 1973, the home of the Rotch-Wales families was turned into a historic home and opened to the public. Today, they focus on the Underground Railroad work that Thomas and Charity did while living in the house. The house is a member of the Ohio Friends of Freedom Society, and became a site on the National Park Service's Network to Freedom in 2006. Perhaps one of the most exciting parts of their Underground Railroad history is a letter written by George Duncan, a freedom seeker who was still on the run, to Thomas and Charity. George trusted the Rotches to help reunite him with his companion Edy, who was waiting for safer passage before escaping herself. George's letter is one of only a few written by a formerly enslaved person while they were still on the run.

The Ohio Military Museum is operated by the Ohio Society Of Military History and is home to thousands of artifacts and tributes to the men and women of Ohio who served in the armed forces. The museum moved to the MAPS Air Museum in 2016.

=== Lions Lincoln Theatre ===
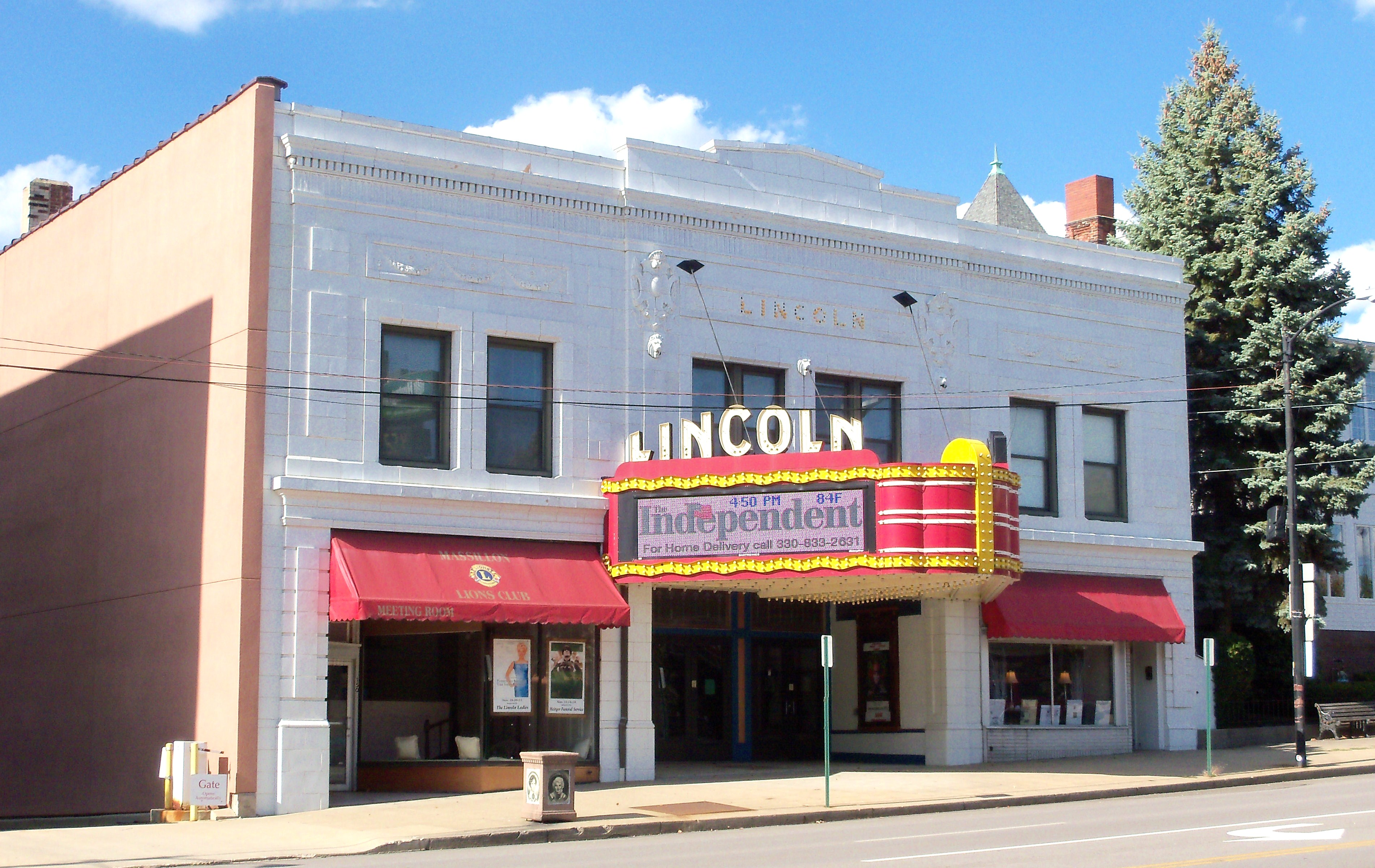
Lions Lincoln Theatre

The 1915 landmark movie theatre, designed by Guy Tilden, was saved from demolition by the local Lions International club in 1982. The theatre is thought to be one of the oldest purpose-built movie houses in the country still in operation. One of the theatre's two arc-lamp 35mm projectors was replaced by a digital projector in 2013. Today the theatre hosts community events, and screens classic and second-run movies on weekends. The stage also hosts live theatre. In 1989, the play Dear Mother and All, a World War I play based on letters of Massillon native Charles Vernon Brown and his friends and family, debuted at the theatre.

== Parks and recreation ==
The City of Massillon Parks & Recreation Department operates a recreation center, senior center, and 35 parks and open spaces. Massillon's municipal golf course, The Legends of Massillon, opened in 1995. The city maintains the Stark County section of the Sippo Valley Bike & Hike Trail, leading trail users to Dalton in Wayne County. The Ohio and Erie Canal Towpath Trail also passes through the city.

== Football ==
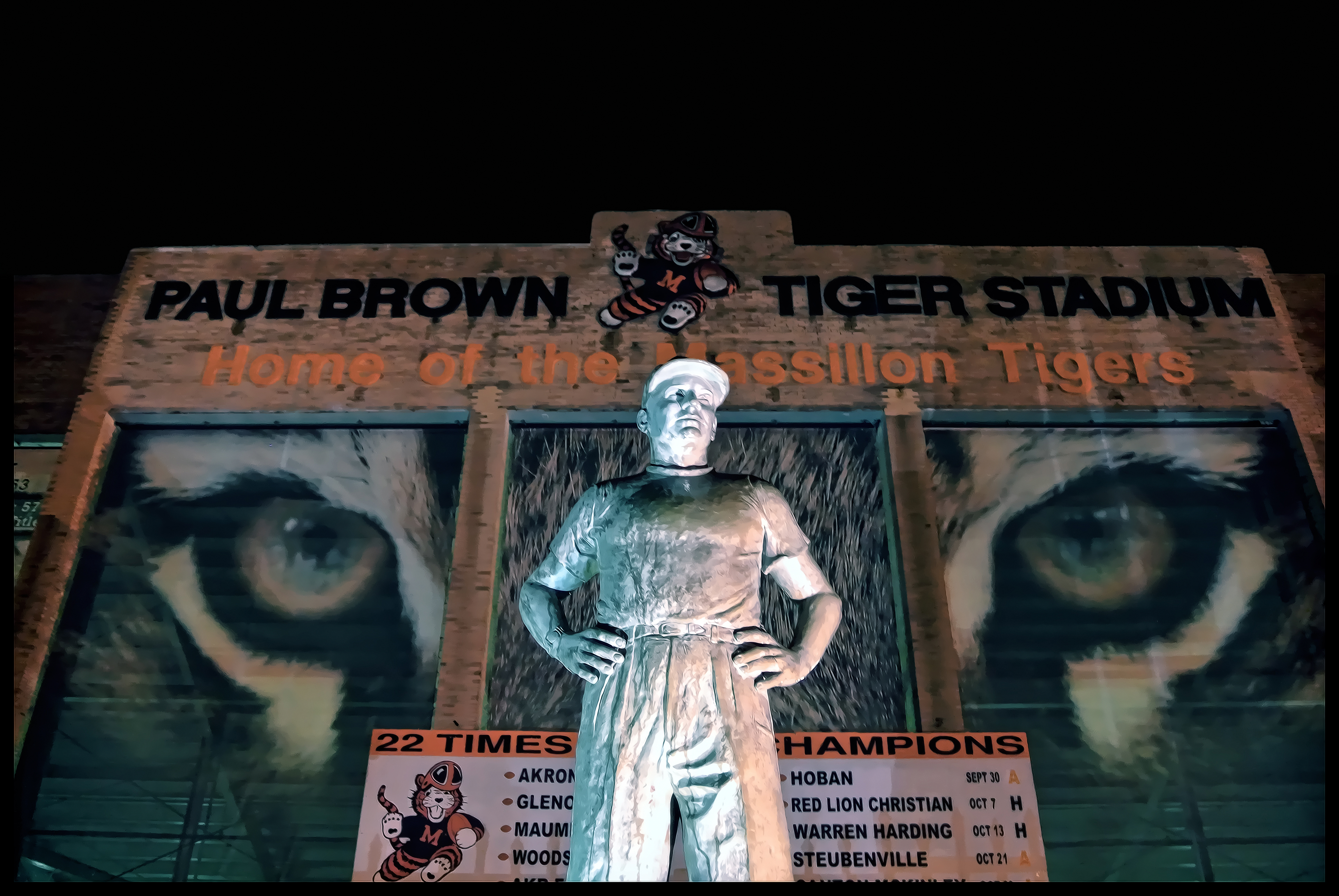
Statue of professional football player, coach, and team owner Paul Brown in front of Paul Brown Tiger Stadium

Football has long been one of the most prominent contributions to the culture of Massillon. In 2008, it was nominated as a finalist in ESPN's "Titletown U.S.A." contest, where a rally was held at Paul Brown Tiger Stadium and filmed by ESPN for SportsCenter. Massillon finished fourth in the voting behind Valdosta, Georgia; Parkersburg, West Virginia; and Green Bay, Wisconsin.

Massillon is most notably associated with the Massillon Washington High School football team, the Tigers. Distinguished Massillon alumni include former collegiate and professional coach Paul Brown, and former NFL All-Pro linebacker Chris Spielman. The Tigers are historically one of the winningest high school football teams in the United States, second only to Valdosta High School in Valdosta, Georgia. Along with the Canton McKinley High School Bulldogs, the Tigers represent one half of what many consider to be the greatest high school football rivalry in the nation. Both Massillon and their fierce rivalry with Canton were subjects of the 2001 documentary film Go Tigers!.

The construction of Paul Brown Tiger Stadium in Massillon was completed in 1939 through the Works Progress Administration program. The stadium currently holds 16,884 people and is named after former Tiger player and head coach Paul Brown. Besides being the regular season home of the Massillon Tiger Football team, the stadium hosts numerous Ohio High School Athletic Association state football playoff games as well as divisional championship games. The stadium also hosts the annual Pro Football Hall of Fame drum and bugle corps competition. The stadium is marked with a historical marker dedicated to Paul Brown and his contribution to the sport

Professionally, the Massillon Tigers and Canton Bulldogs had a rivalry from 1903 to 1906 and 1915 to 1919. This rivalry predates both the NFL and the aforementioned rivalry between the Massillon and Canton high schools which continue to use the nicknames of these early professional teams.

== Government ==
Massillon is governed by an elected mayor–council government. There are seven council positions representing the city's six wards and three at-large council positions. As of 2026, the mayor of Massillon is Jamie Slutz. The Massillon municipal court system serves all residents in western Stark County.

== Education ==
=== Public schools ===
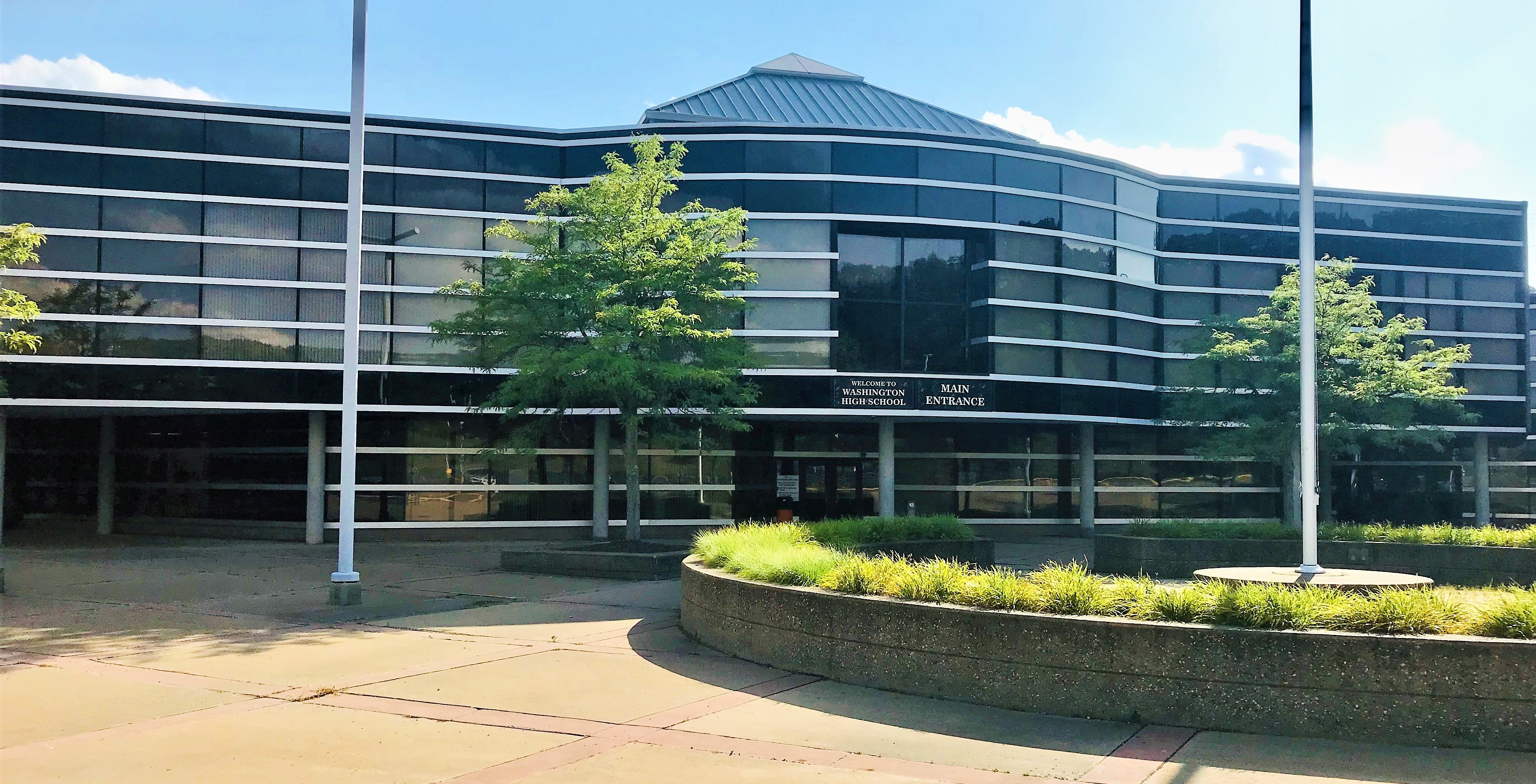
Massillon Washington High School

The city is served by the following public school districts:

- Massillon City School District
- Jackson Local School District
- Perry Local School District
- Tuslaw Local School District

Additionally, the R. G. Drage Career Technical Center of the Stark County Area Vocational School District is located in Massillon and serves all students in the Massillon/Western Stark County area.

=== Private schools ===
There are three private schools located in Massillon. Massillon Christian School, operated by the Massillon Baptist Temple, has students in grades kindergarten through 12. There are also two parochial elementary schools, both of which are affiliated with the Holy Cross Academy system and the Roman Catholic Diocese of Youngstown: St. Barbara School, for grades kindergarten through eight, and St. Mary School, for preschool through eighth grade.

== Transportation ==
Massillon is served by the following state and federal highways: US Route 30, US Route 62, Ohio State Route 21, Ohio State Route 172, Ohio State Route 241, Ohio State Route 236, and Ohio State Route 93. Interstate 77 bypasses the city to the east and is accessible via interchanges on US-30, SR-21, SR-241, and SR-172.

Stark Area Regional Transit Authority (SARTA) has a transit center downtown and provides public transit bus service within the city, including service to Canton, the Akron-Canton Regional Airport, and the Amtrak station located in nearby Alliance. Fidelity US Coach Tours provides charter bus service from the city.

Akron–Canton Airport is 10 miles (16 km) north of the city and provides daily commercial passenger and air freight service.

Amtrak offers daily service on its Capitol Limited to Chicago and Washington, D.C. from a regional passenger station in Alliance, Ohio. Passenger rail service by Penn Central within the city was ended in 1971. Norfolk Southern, Wheeling-Lake Erie, and the R. J. Corman railroads provide freight service in Massillon.

== Media ==
Massillon is part of the Cleveland–Akron–Canton media market. The Independent is the local newspaper serving the city of Massillon and western Stark County. WTIG AM 990 is located in Massillon and serves the local Massillon/Western Stark County area. Massillon Cable TV provides local access television for Massillon as well as portions of Bethlehem, Jackson, Perry, and Tuscarawas townships.

Washington High School has a Media Arts and Communications Career-Technical Education program, WHS-TV. The students are tasked to record most events at the high school including all varsity football games (home and away), all boys varsity home basketball games, produce their own "talk shows" to interview the head football coach, head basketball coach, head baseball coach and head band director and direct, produce and star in their own high school news channel that airs to the student body and on their social media platforms three days a week called Accent.

== Notable people ==
- Bill Berry and his family moved to Massillon in 1971
- John Blackburn, wrote the lyrics of "Moonlight in Vermont"
- Mike Brown, owner of Cincinnati Bengals
- Paul Brown, professional football player and coach
- Matt Campbell, head football coach, Penn State University
- David Canary, actor
- Andrew Chafin, MLB pitcher for multiple teams throughout his career
- Gareon Conley, NFL cornerback for the Oakland Raiders in 2017
- Jacob S. Coxey, Sr., politician and activist
- Shawn Crable, All-American football player at the University of Michigan
- Joseph Davenport, founder of the Massillon Bridge Company, inventor of the locomotive cab and cow catcher
- Jan DeGaetani, mezzo-soprano
- Dillon Dingler, college (Ohio State University) and professional baseball player (Detroit Tigers).
- Caroline McCullough Everhard, suffragist
- Mayhew Folger, ship captain and uncle of Lucretia Mott
- Bob Fothergill, professional baseball player (primarily for the Detroit Tigers)
- Lillian Gish, actress
- Rod Graber, professional baseball player (Cleveland Indians)
- Bobby Grier, first African-American to play in a college football bowl game (the 1956 Sugar Bowl)
- Jessicka Havok, pro wrestler
- Tommy Henrich, professional baseball player (New York Yankees, 1937–1950)
- Mike Hershberger, professional baseball player (Chicago White Sox, Kansas City/Oakland Athletics, and the Milwaukee Brewers)
- Jim Houston, member of College Football Hall of Fame and Pro Bowl linebacker for the Cleveland Browns
- Lin Houston, an All-American professional football player (played for Paul Brown in Massillon, at Ohio State and Cleveland Browns)
- Carlin Isles, a rugby union player and Olympian who plays for the United States national rugby sevens team
- Don James, Hall of fame college football coach
- George V. Kelley, recipient, Medal of Honor
- Bobby Knight (1940–2023), college basketball coach of Indiana's 1976, 1981 and 1987 national champions
- Mark Kozelek, singer/songwriter
- Matt Lanter, actor and model
- James Lawson, civil rights activist
- Lori Lightfoot, former Mayor of Chicago and President of the Chicago Police Board
- Stanley Macomber, inventor of the open-web steel joist
- Kameron Michaels, famous Drag performer
- Ed Molinski, member of College Football Hall of Fame
- Richard Myers, filmmaker
- Kyle Nicolas, Major League Baseball pitcher
- Jack Oliver, geophysicist, led team that proved continental drift theory, or plate tectonics as it was more correctly termed
- Cy Rigler, Major League Baseball umpire in 10 World Series and MLB's first All-Star Game
- John Ruch, member of the Wisconsin State Assembly
- Robert R. Scott, machinist's mate first class aboard the USS California (BB-44) posthumously awarded the Medal of Honor for heroism during the Japanese attack on Pearl Harbor.
- Warren Shanabrook, Major League Baseball player
- Devin Smith, wide receiver for the New York Jets of the National Football League and Ohio State University
- Joe Sparma, college football player (Ohio State University) and professional baseball player (Detroit Tigers)
- Chris Spielman, 1987 Lombardi Award winner at Ohio State and two-time All-Pro NFL linebacker
- Rick Spielman, general manager of the Minnesota Vikings professional football team
- Stalley, rapper
- Harry Stuhldreher, three-time All-American quarterback at Notre Dame, one of the Four Horsemen of Notre Dame
- Patrick Sweany, blues-rock musician
- Jeff Timmons, founder/member of pop group, 98 Degrees
- Ryan Travis, Tuslaw High School graduate signed as an undrafted free agent by the Seattle Seahawks
- Bob Vogel, football player
- John Wager, professional football player
- Tom Weiskopf, professional golfer, winner of 1973 British Open
- Stanfield Wells, Massillon's first All-American football player, selected in 1910
- Alex Wood, college and NFL football coach
- James Young, White House physician (John F. Kennedy and Lyndon B. Johnson)
