= Ryan Travis =

American football player (born 1989)

Profile
- Position: Fullback

Personal information
- Born: January 18, 1989 (age 37); Massillon, Ohio
- Listed height: 6 ft 2 in (1.88 m)
- Listed weight: 242 lb (110 kg)

Career information
- High school: Tuslaw High School
- College: West Liberty
- NFL draft: 2011: undrafted

Career history
- Seattle Seahawks (2011)*; Kansas City Command (2012)*
- * Offseason or practice squad member only

Awards and highlights
- 2× Consensus first-team Division II All-America (2009–2010)
- Stats at Pro Football Reference

Ryan Travis (born January 18, 1989) is an American football fullback. He played college football at West Liberty University, where he was a consensus first-team Division II All-American in both 2009 and 2010. He led Division II in receptions in his senior year, while also tying the Division II season record for touchdowns by a tight end. He finished his college career as the fifth leading all-time Division II receiver. Undrafted in the 2011 NFL draft, Travis played with the Seattle Seahawks in the 2011 preseason before being waived.

== Early life ==
Travis was a 6 ft 2 in (1.88 m), 185-pound (84 kg) sophomore at Tuslaw High School when he caught 41 passes. He grew to 6 ft 3 in (1.91 m) and 205 pounds (93 kg), and switched positions to running back where he finished with 1,321 yards and 27 touchdowns for the 9-2 Mustangs. He was named first team All-Ohio and was league player of the year.

In 2011, the Tuslaw Local Board of Education was considering a proposal by Tuslaw High football coach Nate Held to retire Travis' number—44.

== College career ==
Travis played H-back for West Liberty. He caught 104 passes for 1,250 yards and 14 touchdowns and was a consensus first-team NCAA Division II All-American a junior. In his senior year, Travis caught an NCAA-best 126 passes for 1,402 yards, and he led Division II with 140.2 receiving yards a game. His 15 touchdowns tied the Division II single-season mark for tight ends. He was the only college football player that season—all divisions—to catch at least 10 passes in every game. Travis' 126 catches and 12.6 catches per game rank second in NCAA Division II history. He was named consensus first-team NCAA Division II All-America for the second consecutive year.

Travis ended his career with 285 receptions, the fifth-highest total in NCAA Division II history. "He was a mismatch for linebackers because he could run around them," said West Liberty head coach Roger Walalae. "And he was a mismatch for cornerbacks who came up because he just ran them over."

== Professional career ==
Travis was undrafted in the 2011 NFL draft. He signed as a free agent with the Seattle Seahawks. Travis was listed as the second-string fullback behind Michael Robinson. He was waived on August 29, 2011.
