= Stark County Area Vocational School District =

School district in Ohio

Coordinates: 40°46′02″N 81°28′44″W

Stark County Area Vocational School District is a school district located in Stark County, Ohio, United States. It operates the R.G. Drage Career Center located in Massillon, Ohio.
