= Little Bucks =

Retail chain in Georgia, United States

Around 2004, Little Bucks was a short-lived local retail chain of superstore-like dollar stores around metro Atlanta, and nearby areas of Georgia, United States. Founded in 2002, its seven stores began opening in late 2003, and closed in late February 2005 after going bankrupt.

The name derived from the fact that instead of selling items for a full dollar, it sold everything for 99 cents. The store mascot was an anthropomorphic coin of ambiguous denomination, wearing a cowboy hat and cowboy boots. "Little Buck," as he was called, is short for little buckaroo (slang for cowboy), in turn a pun on the dollar being called a "buck" in common usage, and 99 cents being a smaller amount than a full dollar.

Unlike other variety stores, each had a produce section, selling fresh fruits and vegetables like a grocery store, generally one or two pounds (occasionally three for bananas) for 99¢. Each also sold bread, and even Georgia Lottery tickets, taking the extra penny from its own profit margin.

== Locations ==
Within metro Atlanta:

- Marietta/Eastlake: Roswell Road (Georgia 120), former supermarket, now Dollar Tree and former second location in same center of Seasonal Concepts
- Marietta/Smyrna: Marietta Plaza, Terrell Mill Road at Cobb Parkway, between Value City and HomeGoods, former Treasure Island building (later Home Depot's first store, paired with a Zayre)
- Roswell, Roswell Town Center at Holcomb Bridge Road (opposite Georgia 92) and Alpharetta Highway (Georgia 9)
- Stone Mountain, 5567 Memorial Drive

Outside metro Atlanta:

- Warner Robins, City Crossing Retail Center
- Gainesville, Washington Square Shopping Center
- unknown location

The corporate office was at 611 Interchange Drive in southwest Atlanta, north of Interstate 20, south of Charlie Brown Field (Fulton County Airport), and immediately west of the intersection of Fulton Industrial Boulevard (Georgia 70) and Georgia 139.

== Officers and investors ==
- Glenda Hatchett, star of Judge Hatchett, was listed as company director for 2004
- Michael Coles, CEO of Caribou Coffee, an investor
- Jay Davis, chairman/CEO of National Distributing, the largest shareholder
- Ronald M. Brill, former executive at The Home Depot, another shareholder
- others

The failure may have cost its investors five million dollars or more. It also faced a lawsuit by a vendor alleging it owed 300,000 dollars for merchandise.
