= Bob Nardelli =

American businessman (born 1948)

- Born: May 17, 1948 (age 78)
- Education: B.S. Western Illinois University, MBA University of Louisville
- Occupation: Businessman
- Known for: CEO of The Home Depot, Chrysler, Freedom Group
- Spouse: Susan L. Schmulbach
- Children: 4

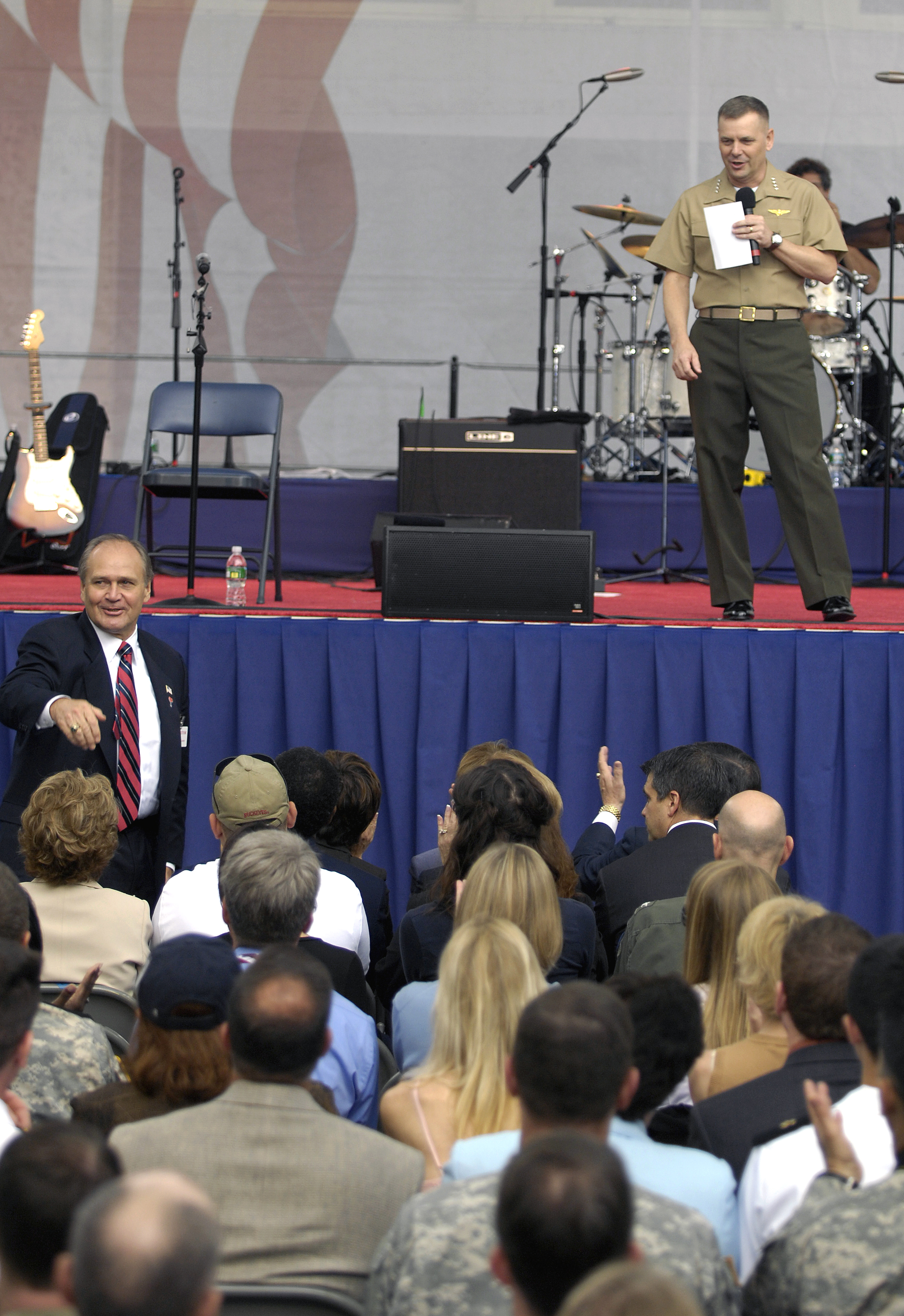
Bob Nardelli being introduced by General James Cartwright at an America Supports You event.

Robert Louis "Bob" Nardelli (born May 17, 1948) is an American businessman who was the CEO of Freedom Group from September 2010 to March 2012. Prior to that role, Nardelli was chairman and CEO of Chrysler from August 2007 to April 2009 and CEO of The Home Depot from December 2000 to January 2007. Before joining The Home Depot, Nardelli spent most of his career at General Electric and had risen to become one of the top three executives competing to succeed Jack Welch.

== Early life ==
Born in Old Forge, Lackawanna County, Pennsylvania, Nardelli attended Rockford Auburn High School in Rockford, Illinois and received his Bachelor of Science in business from Western Illinois University in Macomb, where he was a member of the Tau Kappa Epsilon fraternity. Nardelli also earned an MBA from the University of Louisville. He is married to Susan L. Schmulbach with four children and attends Roman Catholic church.

== Career ==
=== General Electric ===
He joined General Electric in 1971 as an entry-level manufacturing engineer. From 1988 to 1991, Nardelli was an executive for a division of the construction equipment maker, J. I. Case Company, which was then part of Tenneco.

By 1995, he had risen to president and CEO of GE Power Systems, also having the title of GE senior vice president. Nardelli was often known as "Little Jack", after his mentor Jack Welch, whom Nardelli had ambitions to succeed as CEO of GE. When Jack Welch retired as chairman and CEO of GE, a lengthy and well-publicized succession planning saga ensued. Nardelli competed with James McNerney and Jeff Immelt to succeed Welch. With Immelt winning the three-way race, Nardelli and McNerney left GE (as was Welch's plan). About ten minutes after Welch let him go, Nardelli received a job offer from Ken Langone, who at the time was on the board of directors of both GE and The Home Depot.

=== The Home Depot ===
Nardelli became CEO of The Home Depot in December 2000 despite having no retail experience. Using the Six Sigma management strategy used at GE, he dramatically overhauled the company and replaced its entrepreneurial culture of innovative product design with one focused on relentless cost-cutting. He changed the decentralized management structure by eliminating and consolidating division executives. He also installed processes and streamlined operations, most notably implementing a computerized automated inventory system and centralizing supply orders at the headquarters.

Nardelli was credited with doubling the sales of the chain and improving its competitive position. Revenue increased from $45.74 billion in 2000 to $81.51 billion in 2005, while net earnings after tax rose from $2.58 billion to $5.84 billion. During Nardelli's tenure, The Home Depot stock was essentially steady while competitor Lowe's stock doubled, which along with his $240 million compensation eventually earned the ire of investors. His blunt, critical and autocratic management style turned off employees and the public. Nardelli was notably criticized for cutting back on knowledgeable full-time employees with experience in the trades and replacing them with part-time help with little relevant experience. This move reduced costs, but hurt customer service at a time when Lowe's was making inroads nationwide. While the board of directors strongly stood by him for most of his tenure, questions about his leadership mounted in 2006, and in an ominous portent of the near future, he was the only director present at the annual meeting. At that meeting, he only allowed shareholders to speak for one minute each. Nardelli and the board reached a mutual agreement for Nardelli to resign on January 3, 2007; his severance package was estimated at $210 million. He was succeeded by The Home Depot vice chairman and executive vice president, Frank Blake. Blake had been Nardelli's deputy at both GE Power Systems and Home Depot.

During his tenure at The Home Depot, Nardelli met President George W. Bush at the White House in 2002 and was appointed to Bush's Council on Service and Civic Participation (although he is no longer a member). Nardelli also hosted a garden reception/fundraiser for Bush at his Atlanta home on May 20, 2004.

=== Coca-Cola ===
While CEO of Home Depot, Nardelli had a single term on the board of directors of Coca-Cola from 2002 to 2005.

=== Chrysler ===
On August 5, 2007, he became chairman and CEO of Chrysler, which had recently been taken private by private equity firm, Cerberus Capital Management. His annual salary at Chrysler was $1, with other compensation not publicly disclosed. (It's rumored that the terms were that he wouldn't be paid unless Chrysler succeeded. If they did succeed, he would be paid a salary along the lines of $30 million.)

On February 17, 2008, before his first Daytona 500 race as Chrysler CEO, Nardelli guaranteed that Dodge would win the race for the first time since 2002, and that he would award a $1 million bonus to the Dodge team that did it. Ryan Newman, the driver of the No. 12 Alltel Dodge, fulfilled this promise, and his car owner Roger Penske collected the $1 million bounty.

On December 4, 2008, in an appearance on CNN's The Situation Room with Wolf Blitzer, Nardelli was asked, "So what do you say about the argument that the Japanese, the Germans, Koreans make better cars than the Americans?" He responded, "We spent about half a billion dollars in the first several months. Our warranty costs are down 29%. It's an interesting comparison because in the hearing today, going around the panel, the majority of the Senators said that citing specific vehicles that they own that they've got 60-, 70-, 80,000 miles. The comment was you guys are making them too good and therefore, we're not buying vehicles and we're contributing to your problem. That was from the Senators on the committee today."

On March 17, 2009, Nardelli said that Chrysler Financial would require a second round of loans. On April 21, 2009, it was alleged by an unnamed "federal watchdog agency" that a $750 million loan from the government was turned down, on the grounds that it would have required that executive compensation be capped. According to contemporary media coverage "as part of the economic stimulus package, Congress approved compensation limits, and the Treasury is working on clarifying what the firms must do to comply with the rules. In other words, the executives were asked to sign the waivers without knowing what specific limits the Treasury might set." On April 30, 2009, Chrysler filed for Chapter 11 bankruptcy. The same day, Nardelli announced that he would leave the company as soon as the bankruptcy was over and his replacement was announced—later determined to be Sergio Marchionne—who would likely face a pay cap.

=== Advisory work ===
Nardelli became CEO of the Freedom Group in September 2010 as the North Carolina–based gun maker searched for a permanent CEO. In March 2012, he stepped down as CEO of the Freedom Group, and as the head of the operations and advisory business of Cerberus Capital Management LP. He is now operating XLR-8 LLC, an investment and advisory firm.

Business positions
Preceded by Arthur Blank	CEO of The Home Depot; 2000–2007	Succeeded by Frank Blake
Preceded by Thomas W. LaSorda	CEO of Chrysler; 2007–2009	Succeeded by Sergio Marchionne
