= Inequitable conduct =

Deceptive submission of information relating to United States patents

In United States patent law, inequitable conduct is a breach of the applicant's duty of candor and good faith during patent prosecution or similar proceedings by misrepresenting or omitting material information with the specific intent to deceive the United States Patent and Trademark Office. A claim of inequitable conduct is a defense to allegations of patent infringement. Even in an instance when a valid patent suffers infringement, a court ruling on an allegation of infringement may exercise its power of equitable discretion not to enforce the patent if the patentee (the patent owner) has engaged in inequitable conduct.

== Duty of candor ==
The U.S. Patent and Trademark Office's Rule 56 explains that patents are "affected with a public interest. The public interest is best served, and the most effective patent examination occurs when, at the time an application is being examined, the Office is aware of and evaluates the teachings of all information material to patentability." Accordingly, each individual person "associated with the filing and prosecution of a patent application has a duty of candor and good faith in dealing with the Office, which includes a duty to disclose to the Office all information known to that individual to be material to patentability."

== Specifics ==
Inequitable conduct occurs when a patent applicant misrepresents or omits material information with the specific intent to deceive the United States Patent and Trademark Office. In other words, the elements of inequitable conduct are materiality and deceptive intent. Deceptive intent may be inferred from indirect or circumstantial evidence but not from materiality.

Information is material if "the PTO would not have allowed a claim had it been aware of the undisclosed prior art" or if "affirmative egregious misconduct" has happened. See Therasense, Inc. v. Becton. In response to Therasense, the USPTO rewrote its definition of materiality to say that information is material if

(1) It establishes, by itself or in combination with other information, a prima facie case of unpatentability of a claim; or
(2) It refutes, or is inconsistent with, a position the applicant takes in:

(i) Opposing an argument of unpatentability relied on by the Office, or
(ii) Asserting an argument of patentability.

The misrepresentation or omission can include:

(a) failure to submit material prior art known by the applicant;
(b) failure to explain references in a foreign language or submit pre-existing full or partial translations of the references;
(c) misstatements of fact, including misstatements in affidavits concerning patentability; and
(d) mis-description of inventorship (authorship).

The party asking the court to decline to enforce the patent, usually the alleged infringer, bears the burden of proving inequitable conduct to the court. The moving party must show by clear and convincing evidence that the patentee intentionally withheld or misrepresented information, and that the information was material. Proven inequitable conduct in any claim can expose the entire patent to unenforceability.

On appeal, a finding of inequitable conduct is reviewed under the standard of abuse of discretion.

== History ==
The unclean hands cases of Keystone Driller v. General Excavator, Hazel-Atlas v. Hartford, and Precision v. Automotive formed the basis for the doctrine of inequitable conduct that developed and evolved over time.

=== Keystone case ===
In the 1933 Keystone case, the patentee manufactured and suppressed evidence in a patent application and its subsequent defense in two different infringement actions: the patentee paid the prior art user to perjure himself by signing a false affidavit that his use was an abandoned experiment, and bought the prior art user's agreement to keep secret the prior use details and to suppress that evidence. Unsurprisingly, the patentee also did not disclose those facts to the PTO or to co-litigants in the infringement actions. The defendants in the second action discovered and presented evidence of the malfeasance, and while the trial court refused dismissal on that ground, on appeal the Sixth Circuit reversed the trial court and remanded for dismissal, and the Supreme Court affirmed.

=== Hazel-Atlas case ===
In the 1944 Hazel-Atlas case, a patentee's attorneys also manufactured and suppressed evidence in support of a patent application by hiring an expert to publish an article in a trade journal under his own name praising the invention as a remarkable advance in the art. After the patent was approved and issued on that basis, the patentee brought an infringement action against Hazel-Atlas but was unsuccessful in the trial court, so the patentee then appealed the matter to the Third Circuit where the patentee introduced the procured trade journal article. That appellate court reversed the trial court and ruled for the patentee, after which Hazel-Atlas settled on the infringement claim, and the patentee then paid the expert more money. The patentee's lies were discovered, however, in US v. Hartford-Empire, whereupon Hazel-Atlas petitioned the Third Circuit to reconsider its prior decision, and although it refused, the Supreme Court didn't and reversed, vacating the appellate court's decision and the judgment against Hazel-Atlas, and reinstating the trial court's original judgment dismissing the patentee's case.

=== Precision case ===
In the 1945 Precision case, the patentee suppressed evidence of perjury before the PTO and attempted to enforce the perjury-tainted patent. In the application to the PTO the patentee claimed false dates of conception, disclosure, drawing, description, and reduction to practice, and then testified to the veracity of the same lies in an interference proceeding. The competing patentee discovered the truth, but procured rights to the patent by private settlement, complicit in the scheme, and then sought to enforce the patent against others. In a later enforcement action, a trial court learned of the facts and ruled against the patentee based on the patentee having unclean hands, but the Seventh Circuit appellate court reversed, and on further appeal, the Supreme Court reversed, reinstating the trial court's decision.

== Landmark court cases ==
=== McKesson case ===
In the 2007 case McKesson v. Bridge Medical, the Federal Circuit Court of Appeals found inequitable conduct because a patent attorney failed to provide to patent examiners information from an office action in a related case. McKesson is a cautionary tale for patent applicants: be overly inclusive with patent submissions to ensure no omission will jeopardize a patent.

=== Exergen case ===
However, a subsequent CAFC decision seems to directly contradict the standard used in McKesson. In the 2009 case Exergen Corp. v. Wal-Mart Stores Inc. and S.A.A.T. Systems, SAAT attempted to defend with a claim of inequitable conduct, alleging Exergen was aware of two earlier patents that it did not cite to the examiner during prosecution. The district court denied SAAT's motion for inequitable conduct as a defense, however, holding that SAAT's allegations were not specific enough to meet the particularity requirement of FRCP 9(b). The Federal Circuit Court of Appeals upheld this ruling, and ruled that such allegations must specify who engaged in inequitable conduct, what precisely that person knowingly withheld or misstated to the PTO, and how the omission or misstatement affected the patentability of individual claims. The court opined that inequitable conduct is not a "magic incantation to be asserted against every patentee" by a "mere showing that art or information having some degree of materiality was not disclosed".

=== Therasense case ===
In a further development, in the 2011 case of Therasense, Inc. v. Becton, Dickinson and Co, the same Federal Circuit Court of Appeals sitting en banc limited this defense to (a) occasions when patent-holders' acts are related directly to the patent, and (b) when it can be proved that patent holders engaged in deceitful intent. One commentator remarked that this change has led to a "virtual alignment of inequitable conduct and Walker Process fraud that was accomplished by Therasense." Under the new standard, the Court of Appeals found no inequitable conduct in Powell v. Home Depot USA, Inc..

== See also ==
- Patent misuse
- Legal ethics
