= Aikenhead's Hardware =

Canadian hardware store chain

- Industry: Service
- Predecessor: Ridout's Hardware Store
- Founded: 1830
- Founder: Joseph Ridout; James T.E. Aikenhead; Alexander Crombie
- Defunct: 1994
- Fate: acquired by The Home Depot and became its Canadian unit
- Successor: Home Depot Canada
- Headquarters: Ontario, Toronto, Canada
- Number of locations: 5
- Area served: Canada
- Key people: Joseph Ridout; James T.E. Aikenhead; J. Wilfred Aikenhead; Thomas E. Aikenhead; Alexander Crombie
- Products: Hardware
- Owner: Aikenheads family 1901-1971; Molsons 1971-1994
- Parent: Aikenhead Hardware Company 1893-1901; Aikenhead Hardware Limited 1901-1971; Molsons 1971-1994; The Home Depot 1994-Present

Aikenhead's Hardware was a chain of Canadian hardware stores located in Greater Toronto, Southern Ontario and northern Ontario. The original store was founded in Toronto in 1830 as "Ridout's Hardware Store" by Joseph Ridout and was located on the corner of King Street and Yonge Street.

In 1868, two employees, James Aikenhead and Alexander Crombie, became partners in the company and renamed it "Ridout, Aikenhead, & Crombie". It became Aikenhead's in 1893, when Aikenhead bought out Ridout and Crombie.

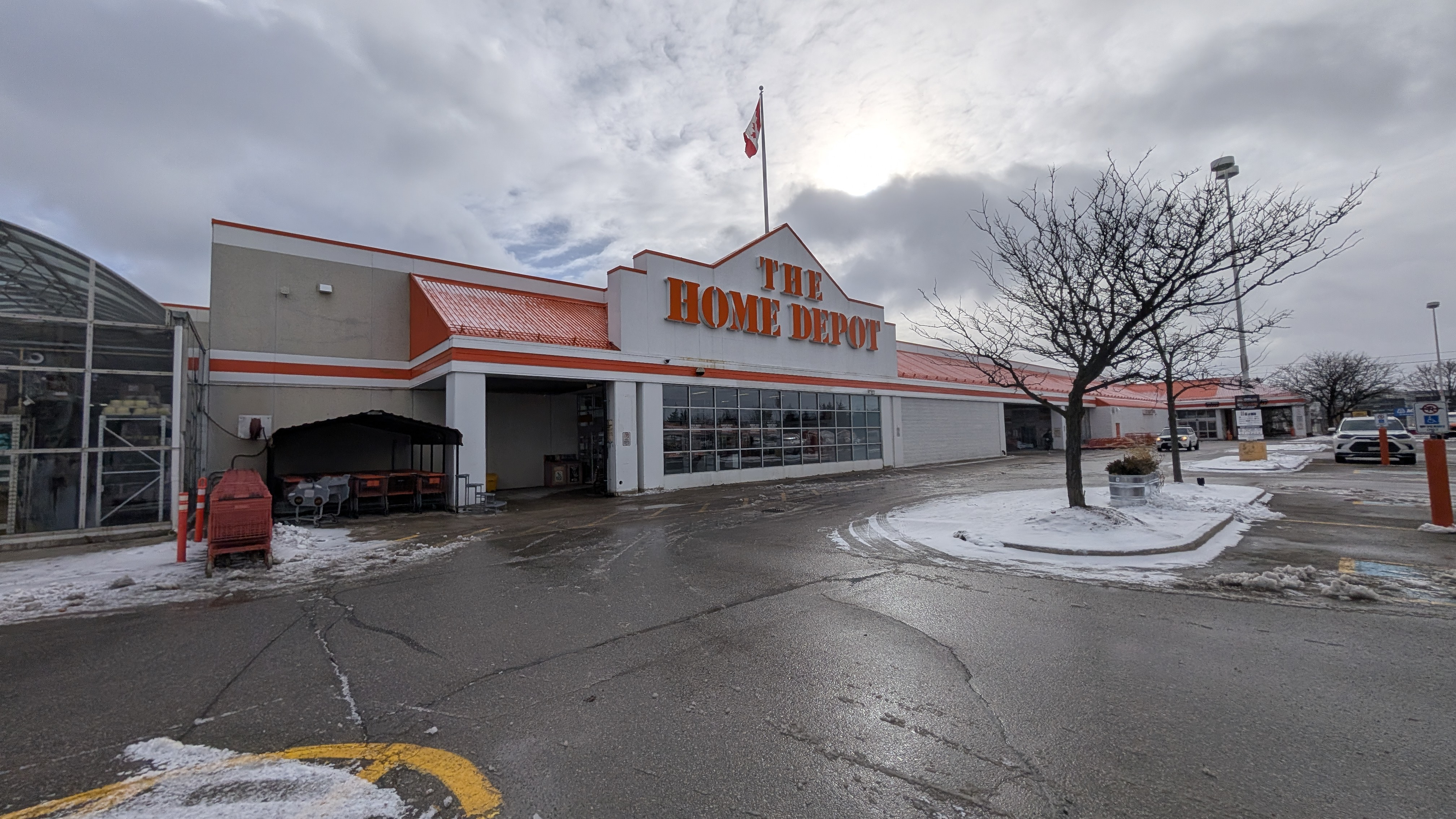
Former Aikenhead's Hardware store in Kitchener, Ontario

In 1971 the Aikenhead family sold their chain to Molson, which later started a warehouse in 1991 to head off American chain The Home Depot. Molson sold their 75% stake to Home Depot in 1994, and it became the Canadian unit. (Molson exited the hardware business with the sale of Beaver Lumber in 1999 to Home Hardware. Molson had acquired a year after the purchase of Aikenhead's.)
