= Chem-Dry =

American cleaning franchise chain

- Company type: Private
- Founded: 1977; 49 years ago
- Number of locations: 1683 (2024)
- Parent: BELFOR Franchise Group
- Website: chemdry.com

Chem-Dry (the name stands for CHEMISTRY-DRY) is an American carpet cleaning and upholstery cleaning franchise chain with main offices in Logan, Utah, and Nashville, Tennessee.

== History ==
Founded in 1977, Chem-Dry was originally based in California. The company began franchising in 1978, and as of 2024, has over 1,683 locations worldwide.

In the early 1970s, Robert Harris worked as a carpet cleaner to pay for law school at Brigham Young University. Unimpressed by the long drying times and harsh chemicals used in the industry-standard steam cleaning methods of the time, he began researching alternative cleaning formulas. During a flight, he spilled salad dressing on his silk tie, and a flight attendant cleaned it using club soda. Harris realized that the same carbonized solution could be applied to carpets.

In 2006, Chem-Dry was acquired by The Home Depot.

In 2011, The Home Depot sold Harris Research Inc. (HRI), the parent company of Chem-Dry, to Baird Capital Partners. The acquisition also included N-Hance, a cabinet and floor refinishing franchise that had over 200 locations at the time. In March 2018, HRI acquired Delta Restoration Services (formerly Delta Disaster Services), expanding its portfolio to include property restoration.

In 2019, BELFOR Franchise Group acquired HRI and added Chem-Dry and N-Hance to their franchise umbrella that includes 14 service-based brands.

Chem-Dry was ranked No. 188 on Entrepreneur magazine’s 2025 Franchise 500 list.
