= Ted Decker =

American businessman (born 1963)

- Born: Edward Decker; 1963 (age 62–63); Fairview Township, Erie County, Pennsylvania
- Education: College of William and Mary (BA); Carnegie Mellon University (MBA)
- Occupation: president of The Home Depot, Inc.
- Children: 2

Edward "Ted" Decker (born 1963) is an American businessman who, since 2022 has been president of the world's largest home improvement company, The Home Depot. He became the chairman of the company in 2022. From 2022 until 2026, he was also the CEO of Home Depot.

== Early life ==
Edward Decker grew up in Fairview Township, Erie County, Pennsylvania, and attended Fairview High School there. In his high school years, he began managing landscaping and gardening for both residential and commercial customers, after having mowed and helped landscape his family's lawn from the age of eight. During summers as an undergraduate student, he worked sealcoating driveways in Erie.

Decker graduated from the College of William and Mary in 1985 with a BA in English and from Carnegie Mellon University in 1993 with an MBA.

== Career ==
Prior to working for The Home Depot, Decker worked in Australia and Pittsburgh for PNC and worked in business development and finance positions at Kimberly-Clark and their property Scott Paper Company, moving to England and Atlanta for the latter positions. At Home Depot, Decker held multiple executive positions following his hiring in 2000, including managing their store and online merchandising, and as director of business valuation. In October 2020, Decker became president and chief operating officer at Home Depot.

Decker was announced as the new CEO and president at Home Depot in January 2022 after 22 years with the company. Decker's appointment to the position coincided with renewed demand for home improvement materials following a lull spurred by the COVID-19 pandemic. Decker took the position in March that year. As CEO, Decker announced Home Depot's record earnings and sales quarter, the company partially citing a global rise in inflation, though Decker also pointed to the rise in "DIY" home projects as bolstering spending.

In August 2022, the board of Home Depot announced that it had elected Decker to assume the position of chairman on October 1 that year, replacing the retiring Craig Menear, who Decker had previously replaced as CEO and company president.

In March 2025, Decker joined the Colonial Williamsburg Foundation's board of trustees. In the announcement that Decker joined the board, chairman Carly Fiorina pointed to his membership as particularly valued in the build up to the United States Semiquincentennial in 2026.

In November 2026, Decker stepped down as CEO of the Home Depot following his return from a period of medical leave.

== Personal life ==
Decker and his wife Cathy (née Creekmore) have two adult daughters. Decker met his wife while both were attending William & Mary; the two were married in the campus's Wren Chapel.

Decker has donated at least $5,800 to the 2024 re-election campaigns of Democratic U.S. Senator Joe Manchin of West Virginia.
