= Craig Menear =

American business executive (born 1958)

- Born: c. 1958; Flint, Michigan, U.S.
- Education: Michigan State University (BA)
- Known for: Chairman and former CEO of The Home Depot

Craig Menear (born c. 1958) is an American business executive. He serves as the chairman and is the former chief executive officer of The Home Depot.

== Early life ==
Menear was born c. 1958 in Flint, Michigan. His father worked as a tool and die maker for General Motors.

Menear was educated at the Flint Central High School, graduating in 1975. He graduated from Michigan State University's Eli Broad College of Business in 1979.

== Career ==
Menear began his career at several retailers. His first post-grad job was at Montgomery Ward, a department store chain. He previously worked for Builders Emporium and was a distribution manager for IKEA prior to working for Home Depot.

Menear joined Home Depot in 1997. He became executive vice president of merchandising in 2007. Succeeding Frank Blake in these roles, Menear has served as its chief executive officer since November 2014, and as its chairman since February 2015. He was given $11.5 million in 2016.

In January 2022, The Home Depot announced he would be stepping down as the CEO and President effective March 1, 2022 while continuing to serve as the chairman of the board. He is replaced by former executive vice president Ted Decker.

== Civic activities ==
Menear is a donor to his alma mater, Michigan State University. He has also supported initiatives through Home Depot, including the Home Depot Political Action Committee and a disaster relief fund.

== Recognition ==
In 2025, Menear was inducted as a Georgia Trustee, an honor given by the Georgia Historical Society in conjunction with the Governor of Georgia to individuals whose accomplishments and community service reflect the ideals of the founding body of Trustees, which governed the Georgia colony from 1732 to 1752.
