= Frank Blake (businessman) =

American businessman and lawyer (born 1949)

United States Deputy Secretary of Energy
- In office June 1, 2001 – April 2002
- President: George W. Bush
- Preceded by: Charles B. Curtis
- Succeeded by: Kyle E. McSlarrow

Personal details
- Born: Francis Stanton Blake; July 30, 1949 (age 77) Boston, Massachusetts, U.S.
- Party: Republican
- Spouse(s): Anne McChristian; Elizabeth Lanier
- Education: Harvard University (BA); Columbia University (JD)
- Occupation: CEO

Francis Stanton Blake (born July 30, 1949) is an American businessman and lawyer, who was the chairman and CEO of The Home Depot from January 2007 to May 2014. Prior to this he worked for the U.S. Department of Energy and General Electric. He was a longtime protégé of Robert Nardelli.

== Education and family ==
Blake attended Brooks School in North Andover, Massachusetts, class of 1967. He received his bachelor's degree from Harvard University in 1971, and a Juris Doctor from Columbia Law School in 1976, where he served as the Editor-in-Chief of the Columbia Law Review.

In 1977, Blake married Anne McChristian with whom he had two children. In 2005, he married Elizabeth Lanier (Blake) who works as general counsel for Habitat for Humanity International.

Blake's son, also named Frank, served in the 2003 Iraq War where he was a Bronze Star recipient, was previously a Home Depot store manager while Blake was CEO. Frank Jr. is now Vice President in the Atlanta region for Home Depot.

== Legal career ==
From 1971 to 1973, Blake was a legislative assistant to the joint committee on Social Welfare of the Massachusetts legislature. He was admitted to the District of Columbia bar in 1978. He served as a law clerk to Judge Wilfred Feinberg and then to Supreme Court Justice John Paul Stevens. Blake also served as general counsel for the U.S. Environmental Protection Agency (EPA), deputy counsel to Vice President George H. W. Bush.

== Management ==
From 1991 to 1995, he was the general counsel for General Electric. As senior vice president, Corporate Business Development, he led all business development efforts, including worldwide mergers, acquisitions, dispositions and identification of strategic growth opportunities. As GE Power Systems head of business development, he played a key role in expanding that business into new technology and global marketplaces. He also held the position of general counsel at GE Power Systems.

Blake then served as Deputy Secretary for the U.S. Department of Energy (DOE), a role similar to that of chief operating officer in the private sector. There, he was a leader in departmental policy decisions and managed DOE's annual $19 billion budget.

Blake joined the Home Depot in 2002 as executive vice president for Business Development and Corporate Operations, and vice chairman on the board of directors, reporting directly to chairman and CEO Robert Nardelli. His responsibilities include real estate, store construction and maintenance, credit services, strategic business development, special orders and service improvement, call centers and Installation Services Business.

In April 2004, Blake was elected to serve on the board of directors for Southern Company, a premier super-regional energy company based in Atlanta, Georgia.

On October 11, 2016, Blake was named non-executive chairman of Delta Air Lines.

=== CEO of Home Depot ===
After Nardelli resigned as chairman and CEO on January 3, 2007, amid controversy over the company's stagnating stock price, poor customer service and Nardelli's salary, Blake was elevated to these positions. Although a longtime deputy to Nardelli at GE and Home Depot, Blake has been said to lack Nardelli's hard edge and instead prefers to make decisions by consensus. Indeed, Blake repudiated many of his predecessor's strategies, and it has been reported that the two men have not spoken since Nardelli departed Home Depot.

Nardelli had pushed hard to make the company more efficient, instituting many metrics and centralizing operations, while cutting jobs to meet quarterly earnings targets. While this initially doubled earnings and reduced expenses, it alienated many of the store managers and rank-and-file store associates, and by extension the customers, resulting in a drop in same-store sales which is a key metric that analysts used to gauge the company stock. Nardelli, who regarded home improvement store-by-store sales as less important due to market saturation from competition such as Lowe's, aimed to dominate the wholesale housing-supply business through building up HD Supply, a unit that Blake sold for $8.5 billion in August 2007 since it was not part of Home Depot's integrated business.

In comparison to Nardelli whose numbers-driven approach never appreciated the role of the store and its associates, Blake's strategy has revolved around reinvigorating the stores and its service culture (engaging employees, making products readily available and exciting to customers, improving the store environment, and dominating the professional contracting business, an area in which Home Depot's closest rivals trail far behind), as he recognized that employee morale is a more sensitive issue in retail compared to other industry sectors like manufacturing. Blake was given credit for returning to the "Orange Apron Cult — the nearly religious zeal for knowledgeable employees and high levels of customer service that was the secret of the company’s original success", as he believed that customer service was the key to Home Depot to differentiate itself from competitors on aspects other than price.

Under Nardelli's tenure, Home Depot's stock performance lagged behind rival Lowe's, however this situation has been reversed under Blake.

On August 21, 2014, The Home Depot announced that Craig Menear, President of U.S. Retail for The Home Depot, would take over as president and CEO on November 1, 2014. Menear has also been elected to the Board of Directors, effective immediately. Blake remained chairman until his retirement on February 2, 2015, with Menear taking the role.

== Awards and honors ==
In 2019, Blake was named a Georgia Trustee by the Georgia Historical Society, in conjunction with the Office of the Governor of Georgia, to recognize accomplishments and community service that reflect the ideals of the founding body of Trustees, which governed the Georgia colony from 1732 to 1752.

== See also ==
- List of law clerks for the fourth seat of the Supreme Court of the United States

Business positions
Preceded by Robert Nardelli	CEO of Home Depot; 2007-2014	Succeeded by Craig Menear
