= Powell v. Home Depot USA, Inc. =

2011 U.S. Court of Appeals for the Federal Circuit case

- Court: United States Court of Appeals for the Federal Circuit
- Full case name: Michael S. Powell v. The Home Depot USA, Inc.
- Decided: November 14, 2011
- Citations: 663 F.3d 1221; 100 U.S.P.Q.2d 1742

Case history
- Prior history: 715 F. Supp. 2d 1285 (S.D. Fla. 2010)

Court membership
- Judges sitting: Richard Linn, Timothy B. Dyk, Sharon Prost

Case opinions
- Majority: Prost, joined by Linn
- Concur/dissent: Dyk

Powell v. The Home Depot USA, Inc., 663 F.3d 1221 (Fed. Cir. 2011), was a decision by the United States Court of Appeals for the Federal Circuit on the issue of patent infringement on a "safe hands" device that Michael Powell, an independent contractor for Home Depot, created in response to injuries to the hands of associates using in-store radial arm saws. Powell invented and patented a device that eliminated the risk of injury. The Home Depot refused to pay Powell for the device and began installing the safety device on its saws without permission. In 2007, Powell sued The Home Depot for patent infringement. After a jury trial in the U.S. District Court for the Southern District of Florida, Powell was awarded damages totaling $20.8 million.

== Case ==
The lawsuit said that The Home Depot alerted Powell of a safety issue with the saw that was causing injuries. Powell, who had been a 20-year independent contractor with the company, came up with the solution, a "Safe Hands" device, to protect Home Depot's employees. After a dispute about pricing, The Home Depot showed Safe Hands to another supplier and asked them to copy it. This device was installed in more than 2,000 Home Depot stores nationwide.

A key piece of evidence in the case was a photo of a former Home Depot executive carrying tape measures, pencils and pads and examining one of Powell's prototypes that had been installed at a Georgia store.

In 2007, Powell sued The Home Depot for patent infringement. At a jury trial in Federal Court in West Palm Beach, Florida Powell was represented by Tripp Scott, P.A. attorneys Peter Herman and Alexander Brown and by Mayback & Hoffman, P.A. attorneys Gregory L. Mayback, Catherine F. Hoffman, and Scott D. Smiley.

== Decision ==
The jury returned a verdict in favor of Powell and awarded him $15 million. The jury also found that The Home Depot's infringement was willful, which allowed the judge to augment the damages award to an additional $5.8 million, plus prejudgment interest accruing since May 16, 2006 – the date Powell's patent issued. The total damages awarded were over $24.5 million.

In 2011, Home Depot appealed the decision to the United States Court of Appeals for the Federal Circuit, challenging the district court's denial of its renewed motion for judgment as a matter of law on the issues of infringement, willfulness, and damages. They also challenged the district court's claim construction, inequitable conduct, and attorney fees determinations. The appellate court found no inequitable conduct and insufficiently egregious misconduct on the part of Powell's attorney.
