= Ron Brill =

American businessman

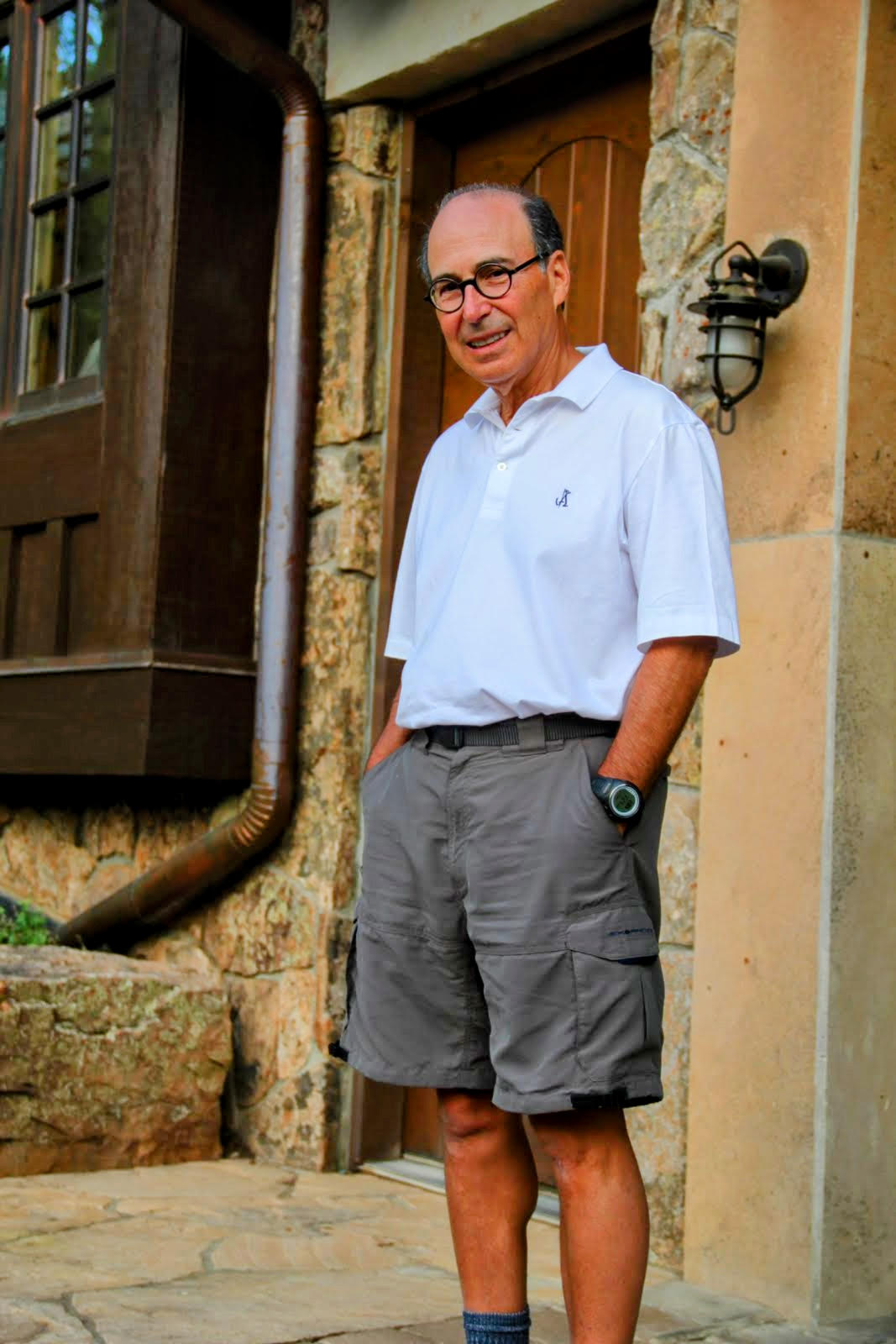
- Brill in 2010
- Education: Fairleigh Dickinson University
- Occupation: Retail

Ronald M. Brill is an American former retail businessman and is a co-founder of the Home Depot. He worked with Arthur Blank and Bernard Marcus at Handy Dan Home Improvement and was fired from that company at the same time they were. Brill was Home Depot's first official employee. He worked with Home Depot for over 20 years, serving as the company's Chief Administration Officer from 1995-2000.

Brill attended Fairleigh Dickinson University.

Brill has made an impact on the Atlanta community through his and his wife's, Lisa Brill, philanthropic efforts. He is on the Governing Board of the Marcus Jewish Community Center of Atlanta as well as the Governing Board of Woodward Academy. Brill has been on the Boards of Trustees of Atlanta Jewish Federation, Robert W. Woodruff Arts Center, Emory University Board of Visitors, Wharton Executive Education Advisory Board, the Board of Directors of the Atlanta High Museum of Art and the Pilchuck Glass School.

Brill was a director for The Home Depot, Circuit City Stores Inc. as well as Pharmaca Integrative Pharmacy.

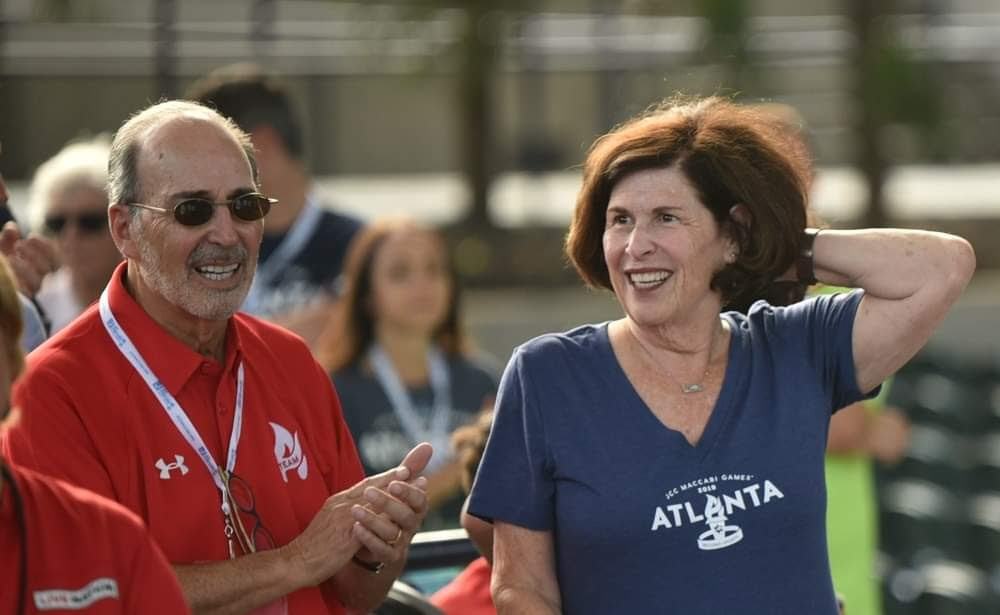
Ron and Lisa Brill

Brill was honored by the community at the MJCCA’s Harry Maziar Golf Classic, June 20, 2011.

In 2019, in recognition of his 75th birthday, his ongoing service to Woodward Academy and his long history of ethical leadership, Brill's family endowed the Ron M. Brill Chair for Ethical Leadership Development at Woodward Academy.

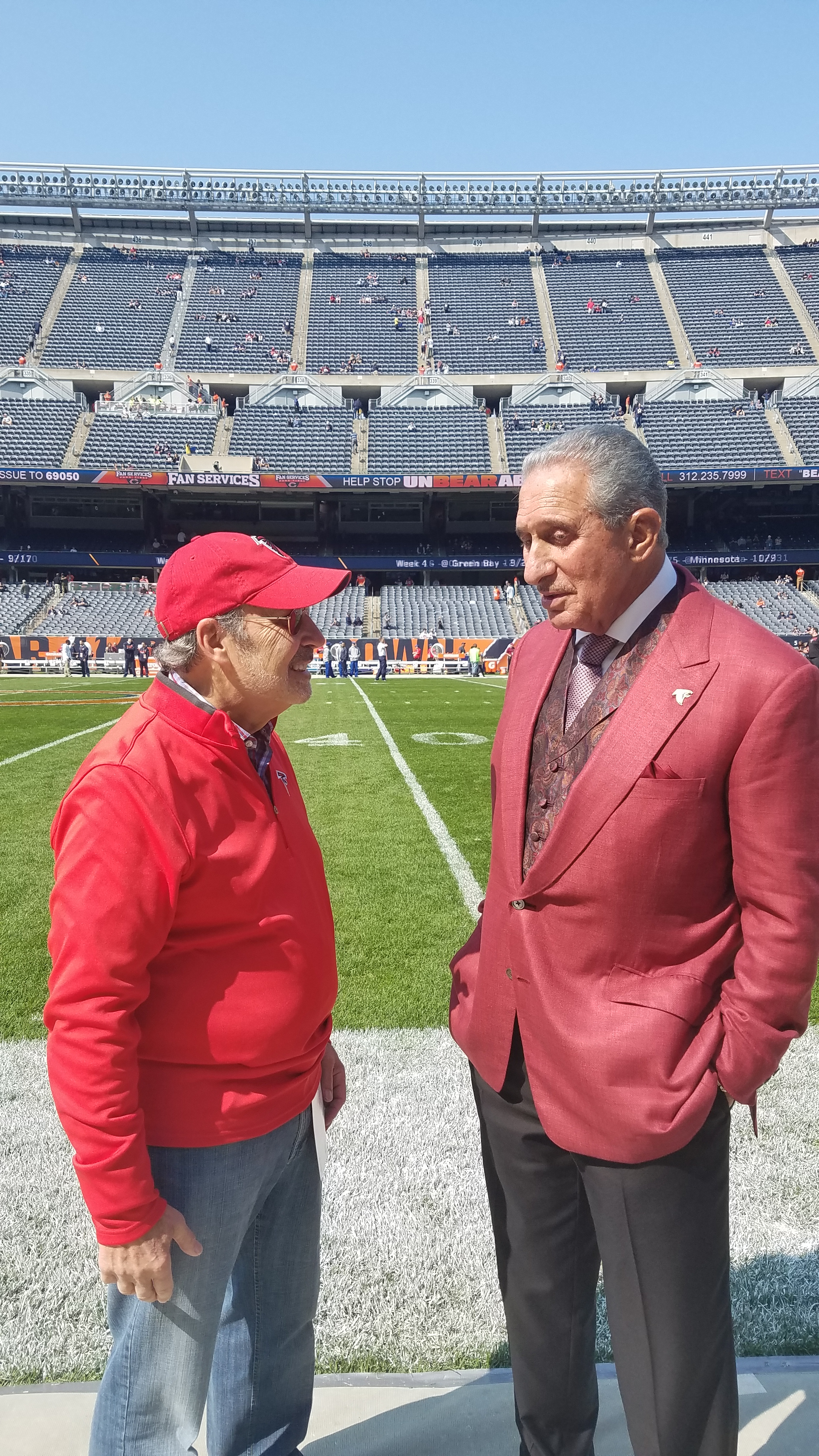
Ron Brill and Home Depot Co-Founder and friend, Arthur Blank
