= America Supports You =

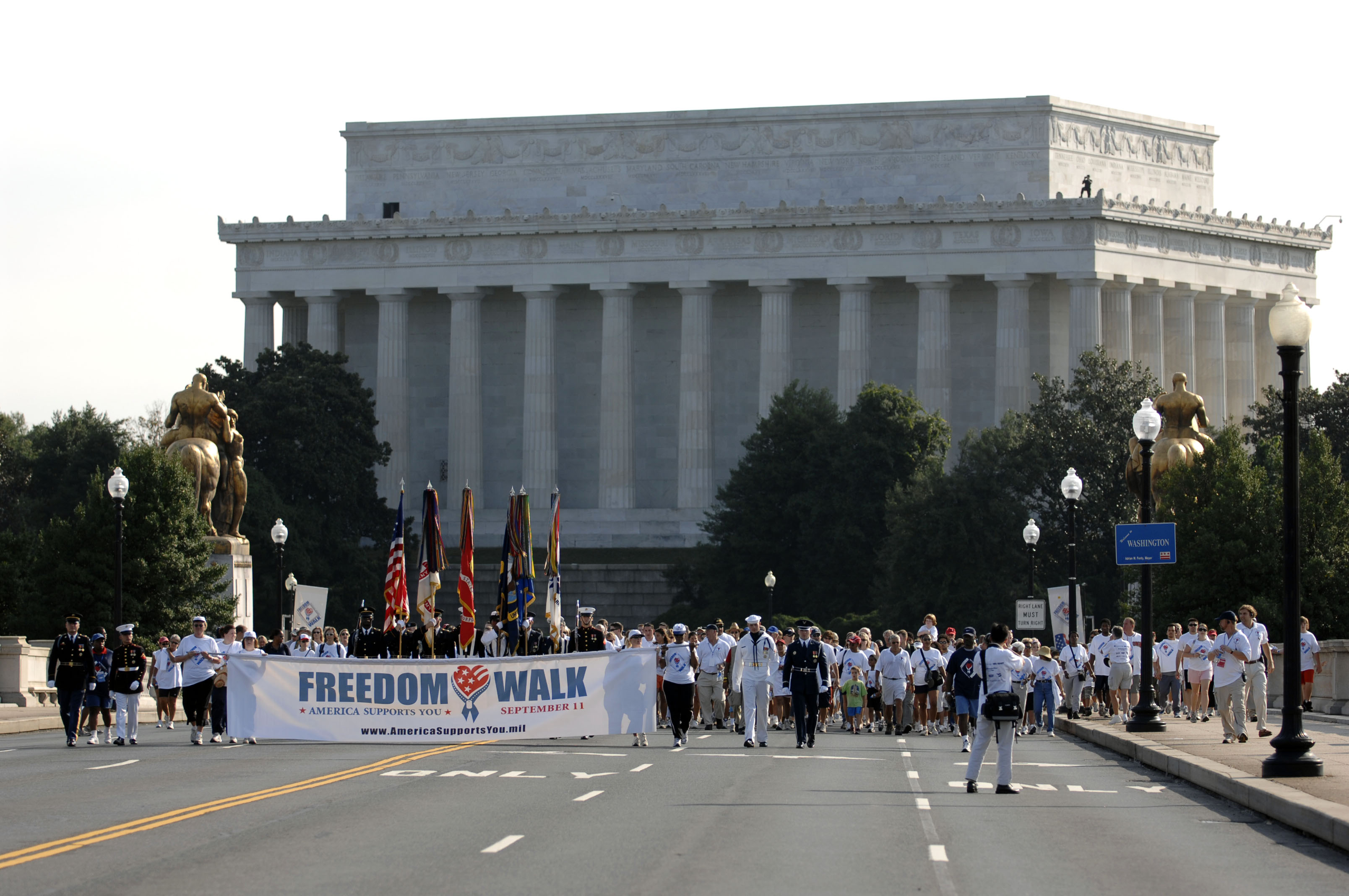
The America Supports You banner leads Freedom Walk participants onto the Memorial Bridge toward Arlington, Virginia (September 9, 2007).

America Supports You was a United States Department of Defense program proving opportunities for citizens to show their support for the U.S. armed forces. The program was launched in November 2004 to highlight citizen support for U.S. military men and women.

America Supports You connected individuals, organizations and companies to hundreds of non-profit support groups, called homefront groups, offering a variety of support services to the military community. The groups provide support in many ways, including writing letters and e-mails, sending care packages, offering scholarships, and helping wounded service men and women when they return home. The America Supports You program also connected military service members and their families to homefront groups that provide assistance.

Dozens of corporations, recognized on the program’s website, were also America Supports You supporters.

== Controversy ==
In May 2006, The New York Times reported on allegations that money had been improperly moved from the Stars and Stripes newspaper budget to fund the public relations program. In October 2007, Stars and Stripes reported "documents obtained Friday show that Stars and Stripes awarded a $499,000 purchase agreement in July 2006 for a public relations firm".
