= Kinderdine =

Kinderdine is a surname. Notable people with this surname include:

- Cooper Kinderdine Watson (1810-1880), U.S. Representative from Ohio
- George Kinderdine (1894-1967), American football player, brother of Shine and Walt Kinderdine
- Jack Kinderdine (1939-2019), American football player
- Shine Kinderdine (1893-1947), American football player
- Walt Kinderdine (1899-1964), American football player
