= Matt Muncy =

American football player (born 1983)

No. 54
- Position: Linebacker

Personal information
- Born: July 6, 1983 (age 43); Miamisburg, Ohio, U.S.
- Listed height: 6 ft 1 in (1.85 m)
- Listed weight: 238 lb (108 kg)

Career information
- College: Ohio
- NFL draft: 2007: undrafted

Career history
- Cincinnati Bengals (2007)*; Tennessee Titans (2008)*; Florida Tuskers (2009)*
- * Offseason or practice squad member only

Awards and highlights
- 2× All-MAC (2005-2006)

Matt Muncy (born July 6, 1983) is an American former football linebacker. He was previous HS Football coach at Franklin, before accepting his Alma Mater head coaching job at Miamisburg High School on November 21, 2024. He was signed by the Cincinnati Bengals as an undrafted free agent in 2007. He played college football at Ohio.

Muncy was also a member of the Tennessee Titans and Florida Tuskers.

== Early life ==
Muncy was a four-year letterwinner at Miamisburg High School in Miamisburg, Ohio. An honorable mention All-Ohio selection in Division I, he was named first-team All-Southwest Ohio as a senior and second-team as a sophomore and junior. The Vikings were the conference champions his last two seasons, advancing to the state playoffs in 2000, when Muncy rushed for 1,550 yards. He racked up 4,323 rushing yards and 61 total touchdowns for his career and made 62 tackles and had two interceptions from his strong safety position as a senior. Muncy also earned two letters in baseball and four letters in basketball, where he is Miamisburg's fifth-leading all-time scorer with 986 points.

== College career ==
As a player for the Ohio Bobcats, Muncy finished second all-time at Ohio with 203 solo tackles. He also ranked fourth with 39.5 career tackles for loss and tied for seventh with 11.5 career sacks.

As a senior, Muncy started all 14 games his senior season as he helped lead the Bobcats to a MAC East Division title, a MAC Championship Game appearance, and a 2007 GMAC Bowl appearance. He ranked second on the team with 87 tackles and led the Bobcats with a career-high 17.0 tackles for loss which marked the third-best season total in Ohio history. He was fourth in the MAC and tied for 27th in the nation with 1.21 tackles for loss per game. Prior to the 2006 campaign, Muncy was named to the preliminary watch list for the 2006 Lombardi Award, was on the Butkus Award watch list and was nominated for the 2006 Lott Trophy as the Defensive IMPACT (Integrity, Maturity, Performance, Academics, Community and Tenacity) Player of the Year.
