= Dayton Superior =

Dayton Superior Corporation
- Type: Private
- Traded as: Nasdaq: DSUP
- Industry: Building materials Manufacturing
- Founded: 1924; 102 years ago
- Headquarters: Dayton, Ohio, United States
- Area served: North America, Central America, South America, Australia
- Key people: Mark D. Carpenter, CEO; Thomas Chieffe Executive Chairman; Daniel T. Dolson, CFO and Executive Vice President;
- Products: Accessories, Chemicals, Forming
- Brands: Dayton Superior, Symons, Unitex, Accubrace, Aztec
- Services: Engineering
- Owner: Oaktree Capital Management
- Number of employees: 1,063
- Website: www.daytonsuperior.com

Dayton Superior Corporation is an American building materials and manufacturing company. It is a provider and distributor of value-added, engineered products for the North American concrete construction industry. Dayton Superior has four main product lines of Concrete Accessories, Chemicals, Forming, and Paving with 117 patents for such products. The headquarters is in Dayton, Ohio. There are 30 other office/warehouse locations throughout the US, Canada, Colombia, and Panama.

== History ==
Dayton Sure-Grip & Shore was founded in 1924 by Art & Carl Kinnenger with help from Charles Danis and Fred Kramer. Carl Kinnenger held the patent on the snap tie design (to hold formwork together) and Dayton Sure-Grip & Shore was licensed to sell it in the U.S. out of their Downtown Dayton location.

In 1953, Danis Hunt Construction acquired Dayton Sure-Grip. After beginning bar support production in 1959, Sure-Grip, Inc is founded in 1960, and the company relocated to Miamisburg, Ohio. In 1975, Dayton Sure-Grip purchased C&M Chemical Co. out of Sycamore, Illinois, beginning their production of chemicals. After the purchase of Superior Concrete Accessories in 1982, the company changed their name to Dayton Superior Corporation.

A series of acquisitions followed, leading to international expansion (purchased Superior Concrete Accessories of Toronto and Cogan Wire Company of Montreal), and the purchase of Symons Corporation. Symons specialized in form systems, and manufactured shoring, formliners, and chemicals, drastically expanding Dayton Superior's number of products offered.

In 2006, Dayton Superior went public (NASDAQ: DSUP). Three years later, the company again went private, led by Oaktree Capital Management. The company then relocated to its current headquarters in Miamisburg, Ohio in 2010

In June 2024, the company was acquired by White Cap, an independent company created from the Construction and Industrial division of HD Supply.

== Milestones and acquisitions timeline ==
- 1901 – Symons founded
- 1924 – Dayton Sure Grip & Shore founded
- 1982 – Superior Concrete Accessories acquired – company name changed to Dayton Superior Corporation
- 1995 – Acquired Dur-O-Wal, Inc. (masonry)
- 1996 – Acquired Steel Structures, Inc. (paving)
- 1996 – IPO – Shares traded on the New York Stock Exchange
- 1997 – Acquired Symons Corporation (forming) and Richmond Screw Anchor (accessories)
- 1999 – Acquired Cempro (chemicals)
- 2000 – Acquired Conspec (chemicals)
- 2000 – Purchased by Odyssey Investment Partners
- 2001 – Acquired Aztec (accessories)
- 2003 – Acquired Safway (forming)
- 2006 – IPO – Shares traded on Nasdaq
- 2009 – Taken private by Oaktree Capital Management
- 2010 – Sold Dur-O-Wal (masonry)
- 2010 – Acquired Unitex (chemicals), Universal Building Products (accessories) and Block Heavy & Highway (paving)
- 2014 – Opened The Innovation Center at Corporate Miamisburg
- 2024 – Acquired HK Composites
- 2024 - Dayton Superior acquired by White Cap.
