= Core & Main =

American industrial company

Coordinates: 38°41′30.9″N 90°26′29.7″W

Core & Main, Inc.
- Company type: Public company
- Traded as: NYSE: CNM (Class A); S&P 400 component
- Industry: Water treatment Fire protection
- Founded: August 2017; 8 years ago
- Headquarters: St. Louis, Missouri, United States
- Key people: Steve LeClair (CEO); Jack Schaller (President)
- Products: Distributor of water, sewer and fire protection products
- Revenue: ▲US$7.441 billion (2024)
- Net income: ▲US$411 million (2024)
- Total assets: ▲US$5.870 billion (2024)
- Total equity: ▲US$1.774 billion (2024)
- Number of employees: 5,700 (2024)
- Website: coreandmain.com

Core & Main, headquartered in St. Louis, Missouri, distributes products used for water, wastewater, storm drainage, and fire protection in the United States. Customers include municipalities, private water companies, and professional contractors. The company has 370 branch locations in 49 U.S. states, 60,000 customers, and sells 225,000 products.

In fiscal 2024, 67% of the company's sales were pipes, valves, and piping and plumbing fittings, 16% of the company's sales were products for storm drainage, 8% of the company's sales were products for fire protection, and 9% of the company's sales were products for water metering. In fiscal 2024, 42% of sales were from the municipal construction sector, 38% of sales were from the non-residential construction sector, and 20% of sales were from the residential construction sector.

The company is ranked 497th on the Fortune 500.

== History ==
In 2005, Home Depot acquired National Waterworks Holdings. It was merged with Hughes Supply and became HD Supply Waterworks.

In August 2017, Clayton, Dubilier & Rice acquired HD Supply Waterworks and changed its name to Core & Main.

In July 2021, the company became a public company via an initial public offering.

=== Acquisitions ===
Date	Company	Ref
May 2019	Long Island Pipe Supply	
February 2019	Maskell Pipe & Supply	
January 2019	DCL Fabrication & Supply	
August 2018	Finish Line Systems	
July 2018	DOT Sales Company	
June 2018	St. Louis Fabrication & Supply	
September 2017	Minnesota Pipe & Equipment	

== Financials ==
FY Year (ending February 2)	Revenue (billion $)	Gross Profit (billion $)	Net Income (billion $)
2018	3.20	0.71	0.037
2019	3.39	0.79	0.036
2020	3.36	0.87	0.037
2021	5.00	1.28	0.225
2022	6.65	1.79	0.581
2023	6.70	1.82	0.371
2024	7.44	1.98	0.411
