= United Grinding North America =

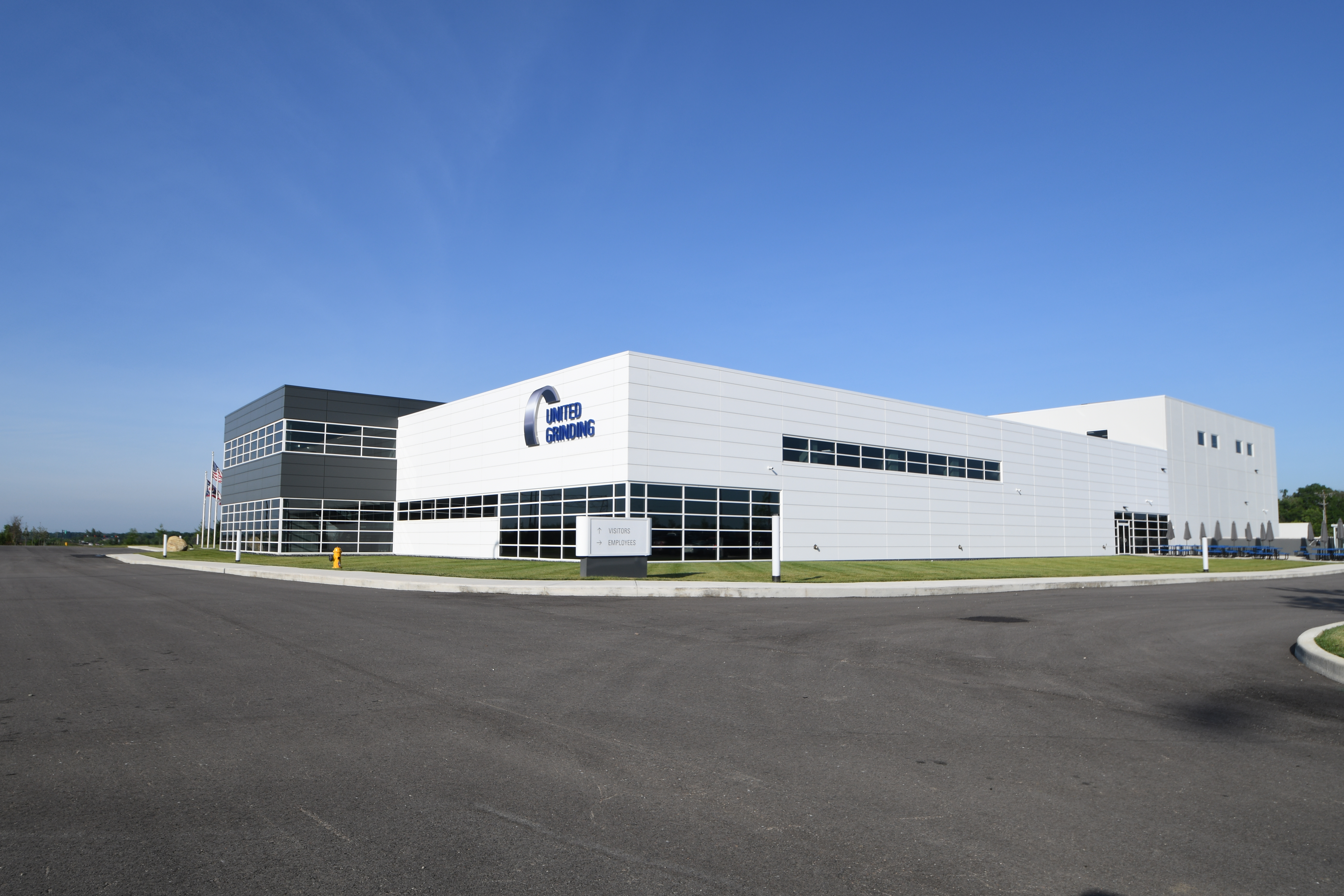
- Type: Private
- Industry: Machine Tools
- Founded: 1984; 42 years ago
- Headquarters: Miamisburg, Ohio, U.S.
- Key people: Markus Stolmar (President & CEO); Rodger Pinney (Vice Chairman, Board of Directors); Joseph Szenay (VP, Customer Care); Simon Manns (VP, Tool Division Sales); Larry Marchand (VP, Surface & Profile Division); Jason Barber (VP, Finance & IT); Simon Bramhall (GM, Engineering & Project Management)
- Products: Grinding Machines
- Number of employees: 175 in North America
- Website: www.grinding.com

United Grinding North America is an American supplier of machines. Headquartered in Miamisburg, Ohio, the company has nearly 200 employees across the U.S., Canada and Mexico.

== History ==
United Grinding North America was established in 1984 under the name Hauni-Blohm-Schaudt in Richmond, Virginia. The name changed in 1989 to Blohm, Inc.

In 1994, Blohm Inc. established United Grinding Technologies, Inc., in Miamisburg, Ohio, to consolidate the North American operations of all their machine tool companies. In the summer of 1995, the building in Miamisburg was expanded and improved to house the corporate offices, the new showroom for machines, the warehouse/shop, and the service department. This solidified the Miamisburg location as the company's North American headquarters to cover the US, Canada, and Mexico, and supports cylindrical, surface, and profile grinders. At that time, an office in Fredericksburg, Virginia handled tool grinders and measuring machines as well.

In 2013, United Grinding Technologies became part of a new brand name United Grinding Group.

In 2017, United Grinding North America underwent yet another expansion, building a brand-new 110,000 sq. ft. facility to combine their Fredericksburg, Virginia, and Miamisburg, Ohio operations into a single location, which now serves as the company's North American corporate headquarters.

United Grinding North America is responsible for the importation, sales, service and localization of high precision grinding machines built by the member companies of the group in Germany and Switzerland. The companies originally included Blohm Maschinenbau GmbH, Sheffield-Schaudt Maschinenbau GmbH, Maegerle AG, and Studer AG. Today, United Grinding North America, Inc. companies also include: Mikrosa, Jung, Walter, and Ewag.

== Gallery ==
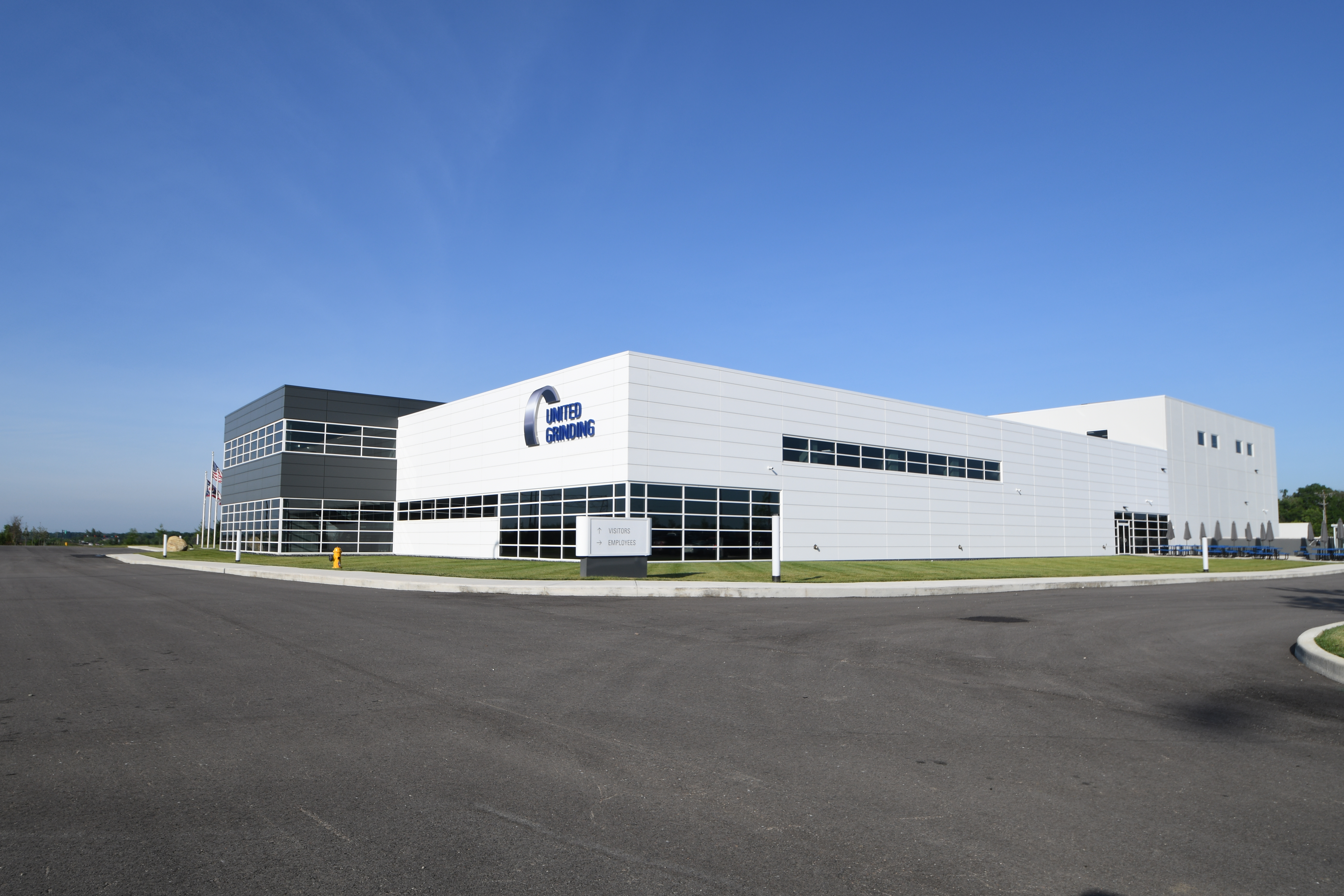
United Grinding North America, Inc. Corporate Headquarters in Miamisburg, Ohio

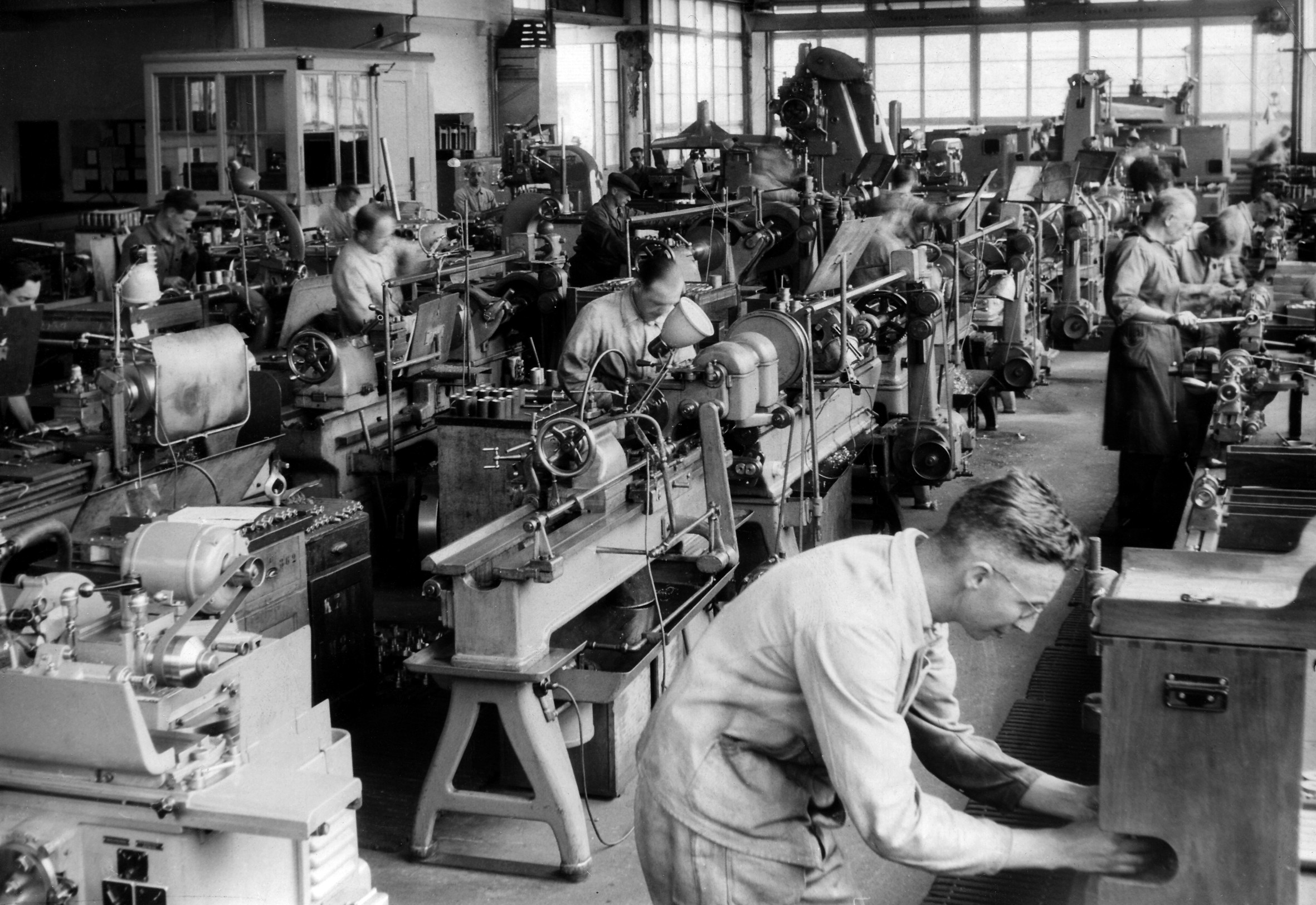
Studer manufacturing (1930s–1940s)

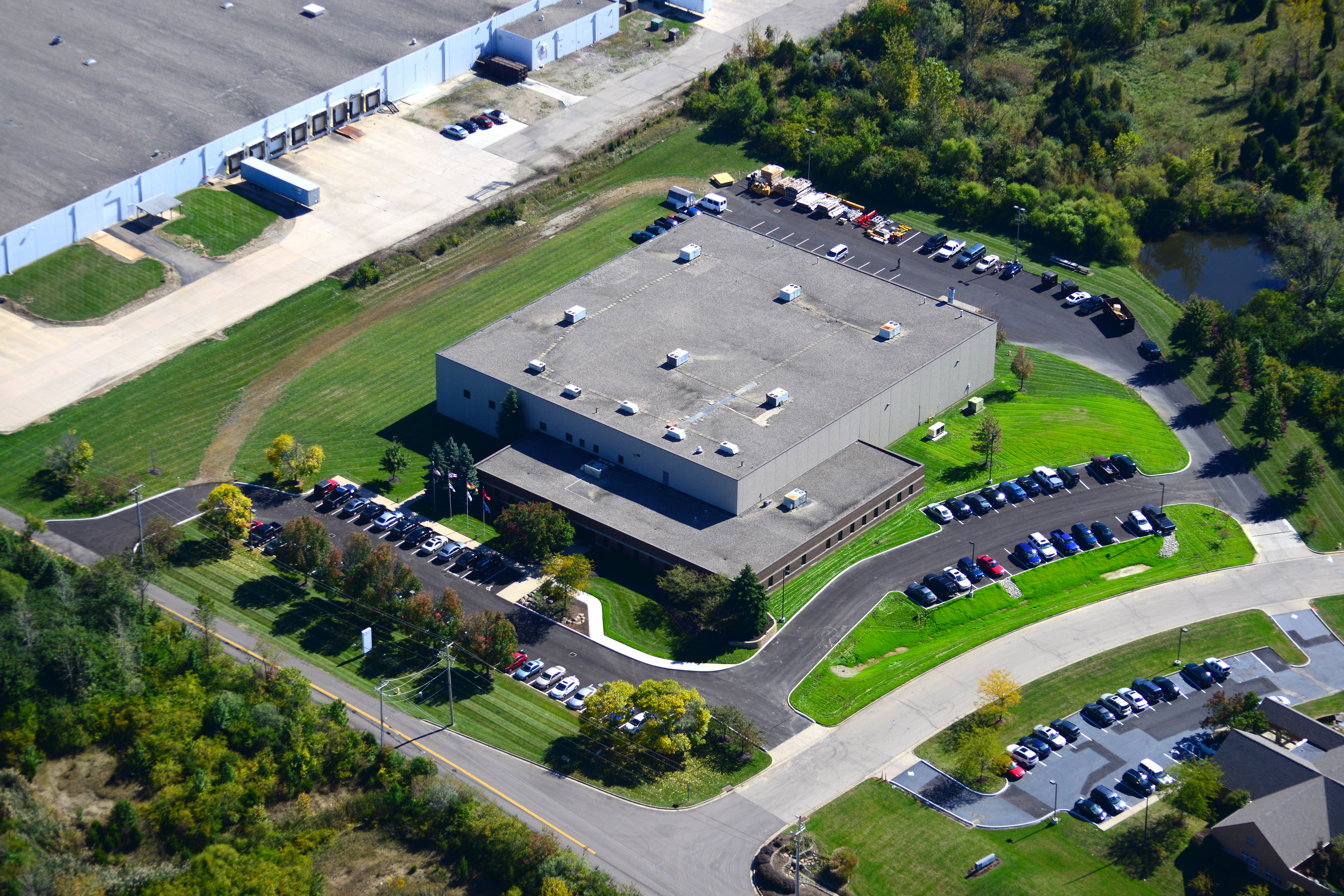
Former United Grinding North America location in Miamisburg, Ohio

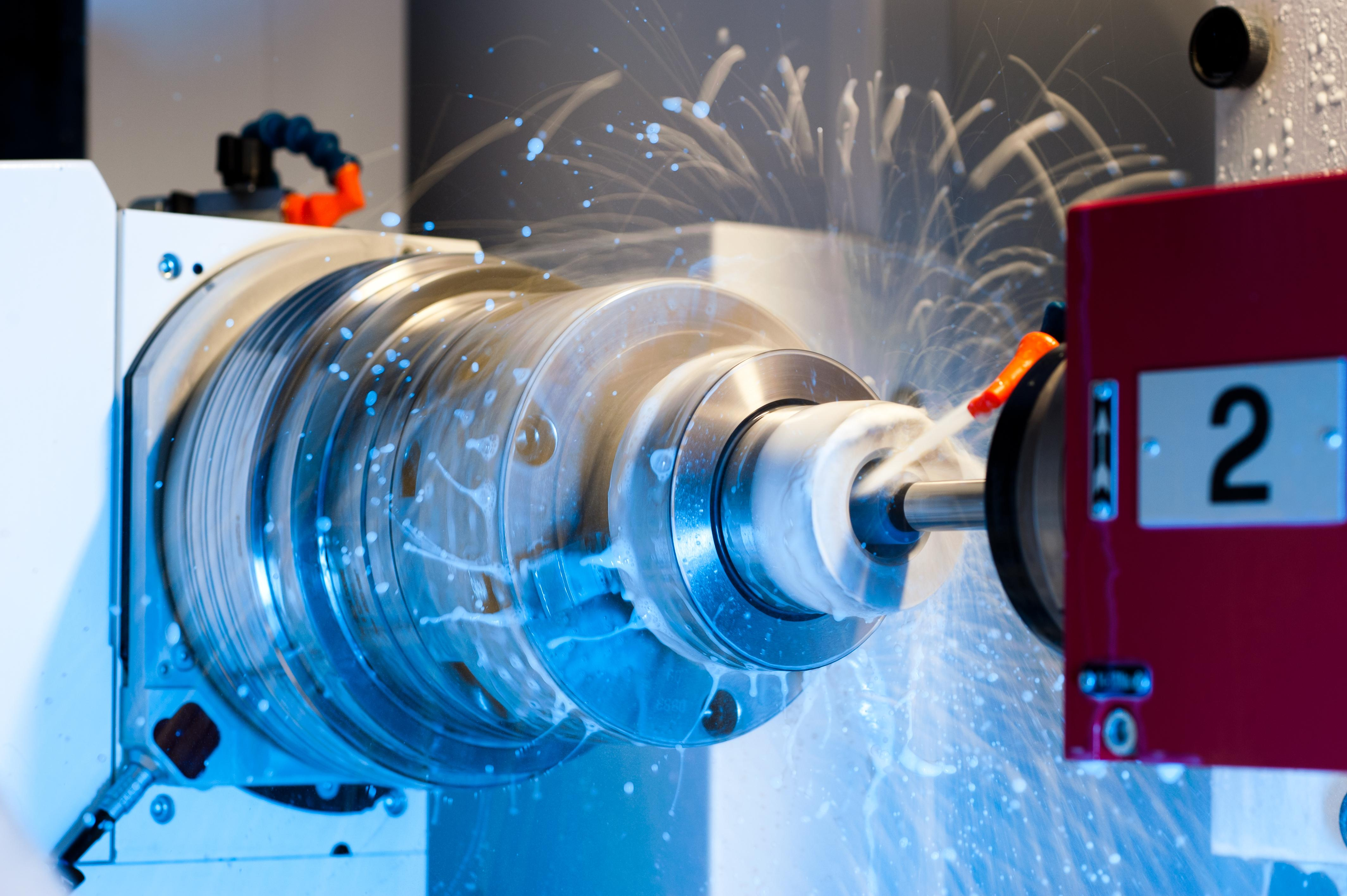
Grinding Manufacturing
