= Baum Opera House =

Opera house in Miamisburg, Ohio, US

Coordinates: 39.6413°N 84.2883°W

Baum Opera House is a historic mansard style opera house located in Miamisburg Ohio, United States. It was built in 1884 by Charles Baum who had originally named it the Star City Opera House. At the time, it was one of the finest opera houses in Ohio. Since the turn of the 20th century, Baum has had many uses, such as a bowling alley, a roller skating rink, a dinner theater, and the site of the first basketball game for Miamisburg High School. It was renamed Junior Hall in the 1940s and hosted several dances. It would later be known as Friendship Hall and served on and off as a dance hall and bar. By the mid 1990s the building sat empty and was bought at a Sheriff's sale. Today the location is very up-to-date and is used as a meeting hall, reception hall, musical event venue. It also contains a small museum for fire fighting paraphernalia and Miamisburg history.

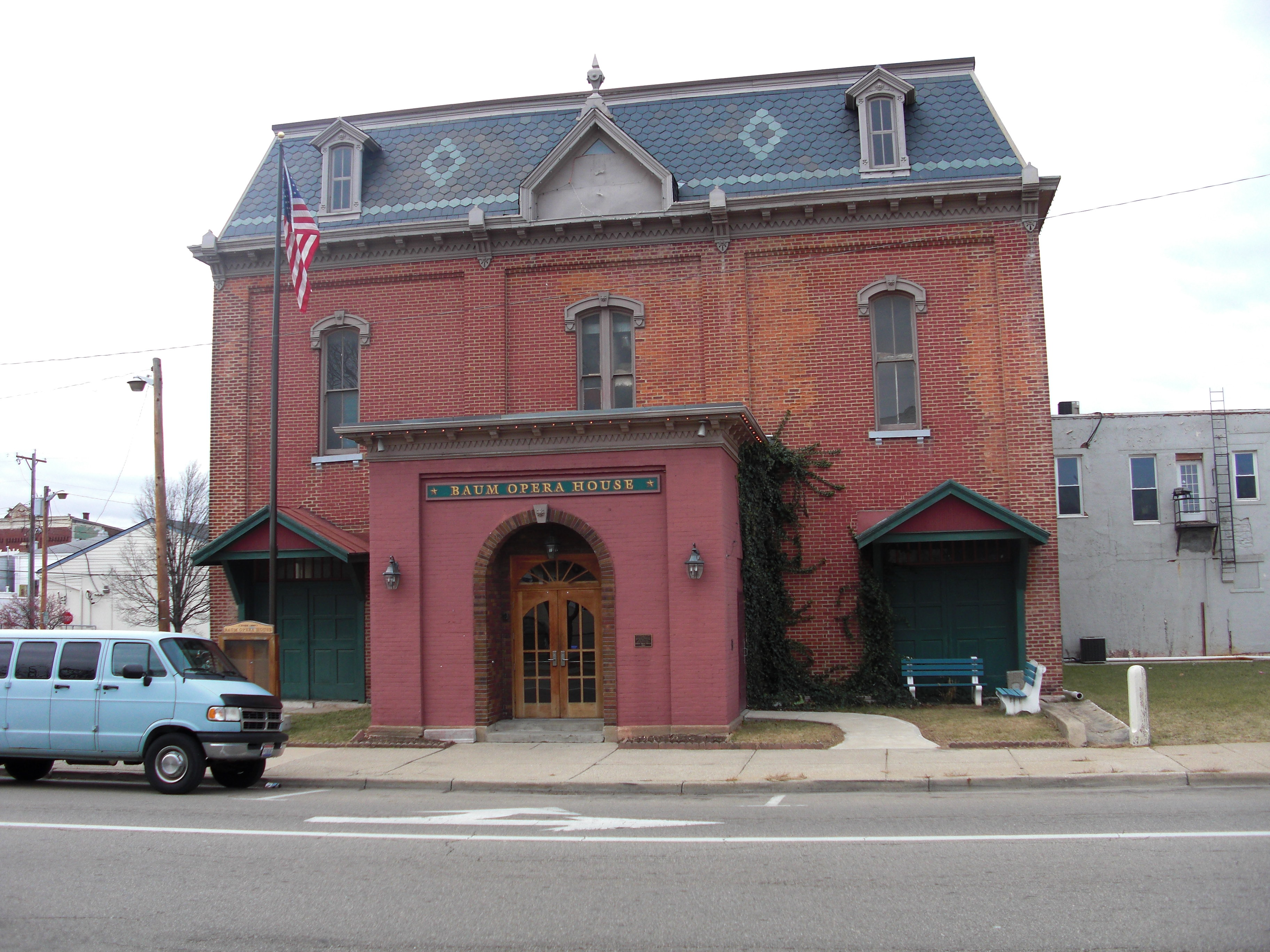
Baum Opera House
