= Market Square (Miamisburg, Ohio) =

- U.S. National Register of Historic Places
- U.S. Historic district
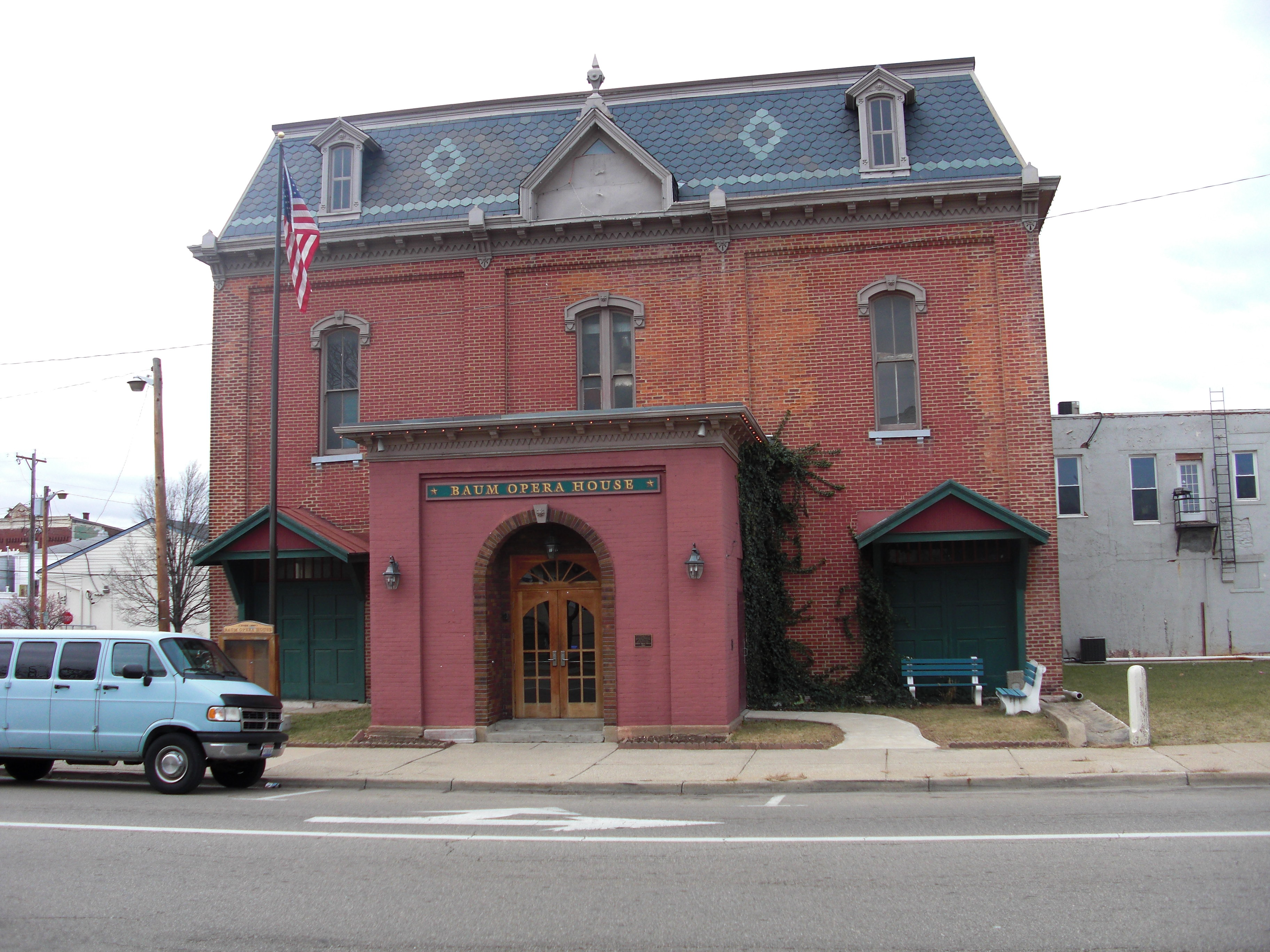
- The Baum Opera House in the district

- Location within Ohio Location within the United States
- Location: Both sides of Main St. including jcts. at Central and Linden Aves., Miamisburg, Ohio
- Coordinates: 39°38′27″N 84°18′2″W
- Area: 10.4 acres (4.2 ha)
- Built: 1850
- Architectural style: Second Empire, Italianate, Queen Anne
- NRHP reference No.: 75001510
- Added to NRHP: November 10, 1975

Market Square in Miamisburg, Ohio is a square located at the intersection of Central Avenue and Main Street. It is also the name of a 10.4-acre (4.2 ha) historic district including the square and more, that was listed on the National Register of Historic Places in 1975.

A date of significance for the location is 1850. The district includes Second Empire, Italianate, and Queen Anne in 50 contributing buildings.

The Market Building, on the square, is a simple building with Greek Revival architecture elements, built in 1851. It originally had an open ground floor with arched openings, used as a public marketplace. The arched openings were later bricked in and used as a police station and jail.

The district includes buildings on both sides of Main Street, including at the junction with Central Avenue and at the junction at Linden Avenue.
