= Hughes Supply =

Construction supply wholesaler

Hughes Supply Incorporated was a very large wholesaler of construction supplies, operating more than 500 locations in 40 of the United States and two Canadian provinces.

Using acquisitions to fuel its growth geographically and to expand its product breadth, in 2004 Hughes Supply acquired the Las Vegas-based Standard Wholesale (plumbing and electrical supplies), Todd Pipe & Supply (one of the largest independent plumbing supply wholesalers in the Las Vegas and southern California markets) and Southwest Power/Western States Electric (utilities).

In January 2006, Home Depot announced that it was acquiring Hughes Supply in a $3.2 billion deal. The acquisition more than doubled the size of Home Depot's supply division, which was subsequently branded as HD Supply.

In June 2007, Home Depot sold its supply unit for $10.3 billion to a consortium of three private equity firms, The Carlyle Group, Bain Capital and Clayton, Dubilier & Rice, each agreeing to buy a one-third stake in the division. Home Depot sold its wholesale construction supply business, HD Supply to fund a stock repurchase estimated at $40 billion. HD Supply did not change its name back to Hughes so the HD in HD supply is now known as Heart and Dedication or Huge Discounts.

Hughes' major operation was in the southeast and southwest of the United States. Its primary clients were professional customers, who mainly buy in bulk. Hughes operated through three business segments: Electrical and Plumbing (electrical and electric utility products, HVAC products), Water and Sewer/Building Materials (water and sewer products, building materials, maintenance supplies, fire protection products, concrete products) and Industrial (industrial pipes, valves and fittings).
