= Miamisburg City School District =

School district in Ohio

Miamisburg City Schools is the school district serving Miamisburg and Miami Township, Ohio. Miamisburg City Schools has an enrollment of over 5000 students whose education takes place in a single preschool, four primary schools (grades K-2),three Intermediate Schools (grades 3-5), one middle school (grades 6–8), and one high school with an enrollment of over 1600 students.

For the 2008–09 school year, the Ohio Department of Education rated Miamisburg City Schools as "Excellent". Miamisburg scored 99 out of 120 possible "performance index" points, and met 27 of 30 key educational indicators.

The superintendent is Mrs. Stacy Maney, with the Assistant Superintendent being Mr. Steve Homan.

The school district is a member of the Greater Western Ohio Conference for athletics and is a member of the Ohio High School Athletic Association. They commonly compete under the mascot, Vikings.

== Elementary Programming ==
After growing enrollment within the District, the District, which was then led by Superintendent Dr. Laura Blessing, conducted town hall meetings at all seven elementary buildings during the 2022-2023 school year. At the time, each elementary school housed grades K-5, with Medlar View also housing some preschool students. However, it was found that some buildings were overcrowded while some had small student populations. This led to some schools receiving more federal funding than others. After hosting the town hall meetings, district officials spent the 2023-2024 school year reviewing grade bands and visiting grade banded schools, including Stingley Elementary in Centerville. After all of this, the changes went into effect during the 2024-2025 school year. This gave the District 4 primary schools (grades K-2, with some housing preschool aged students) and 3 intermediate schools (grades 3-5).

== Previous Construction ==
Various construction projects totalling $79.5 million have been completed throughout the district including:

- Major expansion and renovation of Miamisburg High School on Belvo Road for 2000 students (COMPLETED summer 2016)
- Construction of the new Miamisburg Middle School on Miamisburg-Springboro Road for 1500 students serving grades 6-8 (COMPLETED summer 2011)
- Construction of Dr. Jane Chance Elementary School on Wood Road for 550 students (COMPLETED summer 2010)
- Historic renovation and major expansion of Kinder Elementary Schools to create a new 550-student, K-5 facility for downtown Miamisburg students (COMPLETED summer 2012)
- Security vestibule construction at Bauer Elementary, Bear Elementary, Mound Elementary and Mark Twain elementaries (COMPLETED summer 2008 and summer 2009 [Bauer])
- Extensive renovations to the Harmon Field football stadium (COMPLETED summer 2009)
- Significant expansion of the Transportation Center parking lot (COMPLETED summer 2009)

== Schools ==
=== High schools ===
- Miamisburg High School (1972)

=== Middle schools ===
- Miamisburg Middle School (2011)

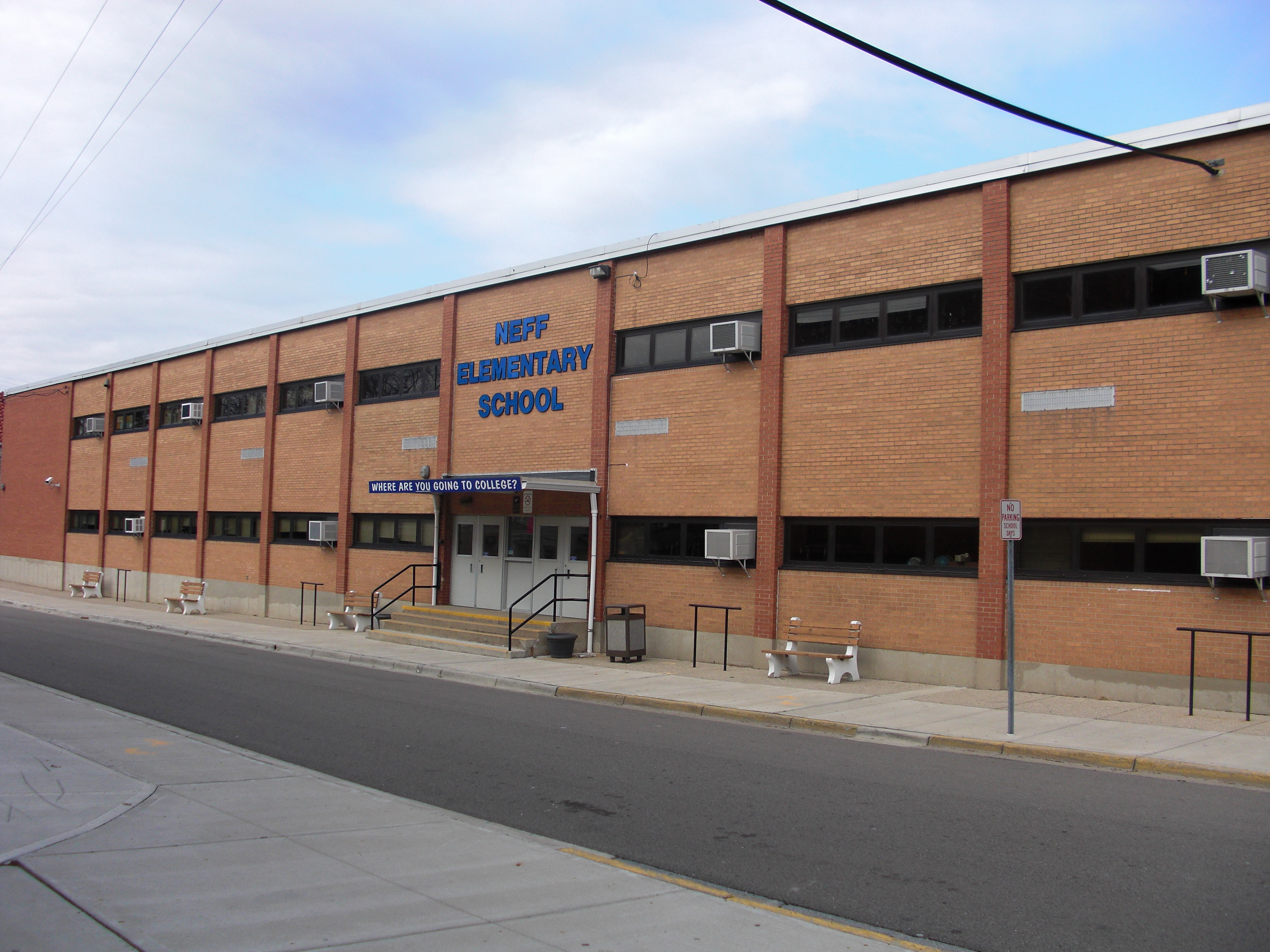
Front side of Neff Elementary (closed, 2011)

=== Intermediate schools ===
- Jane Chance Intermediate (2010)
- Kinder Intermediate (1906, remodeled 2012)
- Mound Intermediate (1955)

=== Primary schools ===
- LaVeta Bauer Primary
- H.V. Bear Primary
- Mark Twain Primary
- Medlar View Primary

=== Preschools ===
- Bear Primary

    In early 2026, superintendent Stacy Maney announced that Bear Primary would house all preschool students.

=== Alternative Programming ===
- Maddux-Lang Alternative School (2008)

== Miamisburg Middle School ==
Miamisburg Middle School opened in 2011, replacing the former Wantz Middle School and the Neff building. The school was constructed to consolidate middle-grade students into a single facility serving grades 6–8; previously, sixth-grade students attended a separate building while seventh- and eighth-grade students attended Wantz Middle School. Both former buildings were demolished several years after the new middle school opened.

The building has a capacity of approximately 1,500 students and is organized into three separate academic wings, one for each grade level. The design was intended to create a "school within a school" environment for students. Facilities include a dining hall with seating for approximately 500 students, a large gymnasium that can be divided into three sections, wireless-enabled classrooms, a courtyard space for students, and a playing field located south of the campus.

== See also ==
- List of school districts in Ohio
