= The Hamburger Wagon =

Restaurant in Miamisburg, Ohio, U.S.

- Interactive map of The Hamburger Wagon

Restaurant information
- Established: 1913
- Food type: Hamburger
- Location: Miamisburg, Ohio, U.S.
- Website: hamburgerwagon.com

The Hamburger Wagon is a hamburger restaurant located on the sidewalk of the Market Square in Miamisburg, Ohio. The establishment was opened in 1913 by Sherman "Cocky" Porter to help feed Red Cross workers and residents of Miamisburg rebuilding from the Great Flood.

The Hamburger Wagon is a small wagon, large enough for only two people to work side by side; one cooks while the other one prepares the buns and handles the money. The wagon, still at approximately the same location where it originated, is rolled away and stored indoors nightly. The establishment has changed ownership hands several times throughout the years, most recently bought by Jack Sperry in September 2008 from Michelle Lyons. Unchanged, however, is the flagship product: small hamburgers cooked by oil in a large skillet and served on a roll with an onion, pickle, salt and pepper. The burgers have a crispness on the outside due to being deep fried.

== History ==
The wagon was started by Sherman "Cocky" Porter as a way to feed Red Cross Workers and area residents while rebuilding after the Great Flood. Michelle Lyon owned the wagon until 2008. Jack Sperry bought the wagon from Lyon.

== Menu ==
The wagon offers 3-ounce hamburgers on buns with pickles, onion, salt and pepper, plus chips and soft drinks. Cheeseburgers are not offered. The hamburgers have a crispy exterior.

== Reception ==
The Hamburger Wagon was voted Dayton's best burger joint in 2008. It was also recently featured in the book by George Motz, "Hamburger America: A State-By-State Guide to 100 Great Burger Joints."

== See also ==
- List of hamburger restaurants
