= Vincent G. Apple =

American inventor

Vincent Groby Apple (January 26, 1874 – September 24, 1932) was an American inventor whose parts were used in the first commercially successful American flight of a heavier-than-air powered airplane. He held more than 350 patents during his lifetime.

Apple was born on a farm, just outside Miamisburg, Ohio. In 1903, his magneto ignition system was used by the Wright brothers in their flyers at Kitty Hawk.

He was the founder of the Franklin Electric Company, Apple Dayton Electric and Manufacturing Company and the Vincent G. Apple Laboratories at Dayton, all based in Dayton, Ohio.
