= Gebhart Tavern =

Museum in Miamisburg, Ohio

- Established: 1811
- Coordinates: 39°38′18″N 84°17′27″W
- Website: www.historicalmiamisburg.org/gebhart-tavern-heritage-village

Gebhart Tavern, also known as the Daniel Gebhart Tavern Museum, is a small museum located in Miamisburg, Ohio, United States. It is a popular attraction in Miamisburg and is currently being run by the Miamisburg Historical Society.

== History ==
The building was first opened as a frontier tavern in 1811 by Daniel Gebhart. The tavern served as a popular travel destination in the 19th century. Today only the house remains due to the destruction of the property from the 1913 Great Dayton Flood which affected all of Miamisburg as well. In 1968 and 1975 the tavern was restored into a museum.

Timber from the building has been used for dendrochonological research.
