= Miamisburg High School =

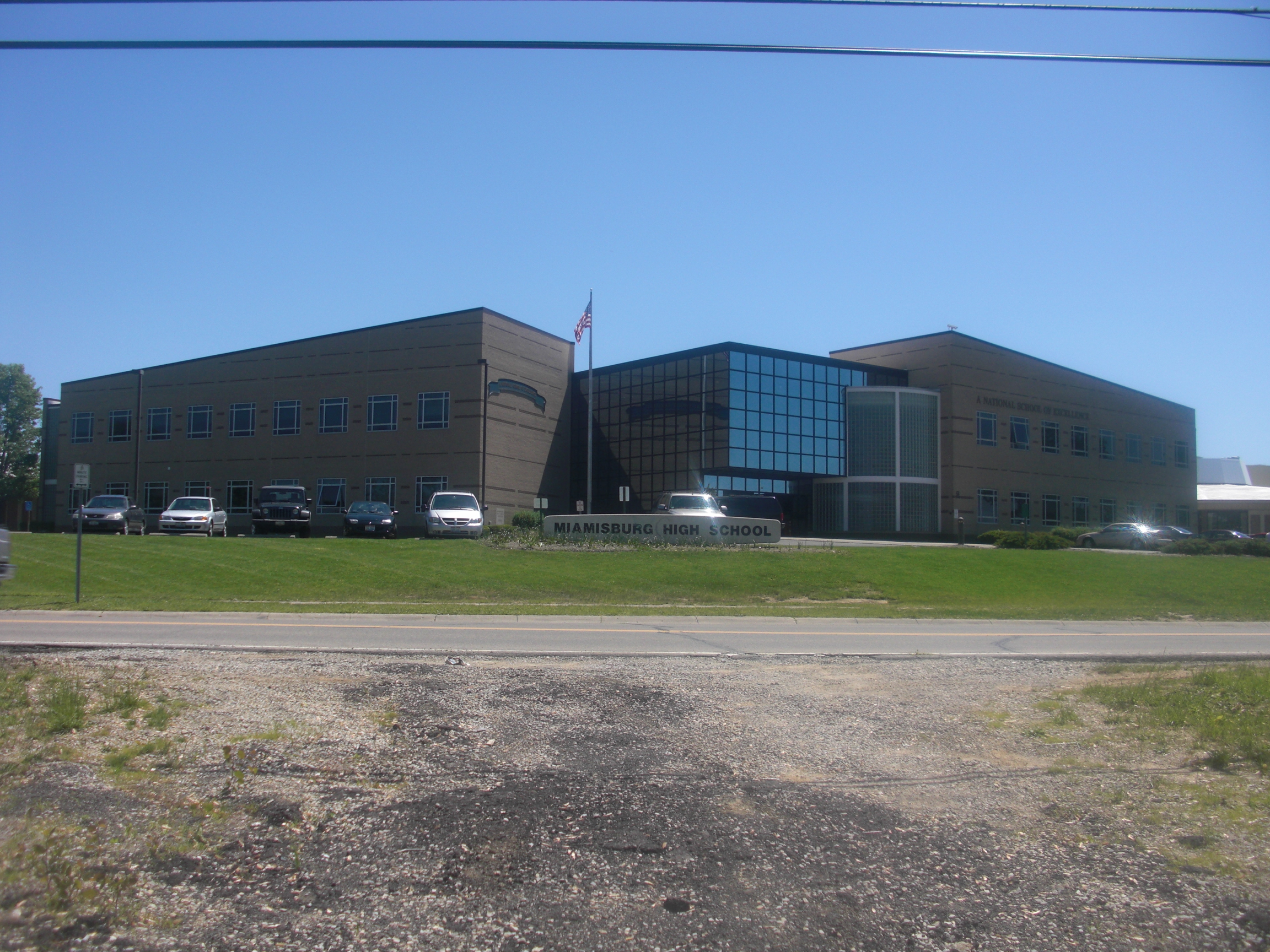
- The front side of Miamisburg High School

Location
- 1860 Belvo Road; Miamisburg, Ohio 45342; United States
- 39°37′41″N 84°15′27″W

Information
- Type: Public
- School district: Miamisburg City School District
- Principal: Michael Black
- Teaching staff: 81.50 (FTE)
- Grades: 9–12
- Enrollment: 1,462 (2023-2024)
- Student to teacher ratio: 17.94
- Colors: Royal blue & White
- Athletics conference: Greater Western Ohio Conference; West Division
- Team name: Vikings
- Rival: Springboro High School
- Newspaper: The Blue and White
- Yearbook: Mirus
- Website: www.miamisburgcityschools.org/o/mhs

Miamisburg High School is a public high school located in Miamisburg, Ohio, United States, serving grades 9-12. The current principal is Michael Black. It is part of the Miamisburg City School District and is the only high school in Miamisburg. The school athletic teams are known as the Vikings and the school colors are royal blue and white.

== History ==
The current Miamisburg High School was built in 1972 at approximately 100,000 square feet (9,300 m^{2}) and originally featured the controversial but then-popular open plan concept of "classrooms without walls". The building layout featured three classroom pods (later to be called the 100s, 300s and 500s wings) forming a triangle around a center core. The central pod included the main entrance, administrative space, the school library, a 200-seat lecture hall, and a 16,000 square feet (1,500 m^{2}) commons area, the largest "room" in the Miamisburg School District. From its opening in 1972 until the completion of a new classroom wing in 1993, this building housed grades 10, 11, and 12. Ninth grade students occupied the former high school on Sixth Street which subsequently became the 6th grade Neff Elementary School until construction of the new Miamisburg Middle School in 2011. The original 1972 structure was designed by architect Marlin Heist who also designed LaVeta Bauer Elementary School on Springboro Pike in 1967.

The academic pods were completely reprogrammed to follow a more traditional layout within just a few years and MHS received its first addition in 1980. This involved construction of a 32,000 square feet (3,000 m^{2}) two-story gymnasium complex complete with a running track and gymnastics area, locker rooms, and fine arts classrooms (known as the 600's wing). In 1982, a 16,000 square feet (1,500 m^{2}) classroom wing was added which gave the school 16 more classrooms (the 400's wing). These expansions were designed by Van Buren & Firestone Architects and were constructed at the rear corners of the facility.

Expansion came again to Miamisburg High School in 1993 in the form of a modern, 29,000-square-foot (2,700 m^{2}), two-story, glass and brick addition constructed at the front of the school, providing an entirely new facade. This addition (known as the 200s wing) included 20 classrooms, administrative suites, a teachers lounge, and a two-story atrium which serves as a student commons area and entrance lobby. The upper level hallways are tied together by a bridge that spans the atrium. The completion of this structure brought sufficient space to the school to house 9th grade students which had been previously housed in Miamisburg Mid-High School on Sixth Street (later Neff Elementary School). This allowed a comprehensive four-year high school curriculum to be developed at a single campus for the first time since 1971. The 1993 addition was designed by Levin-Porter Associates.

Faced with increasing student enrollment, the district embarked on an ambitious, $21 million renovation and expansion project at the high school between 2009 and 2012 funded as part of a district-wide facilities improvement program. The project was predicated on the demolition of two of the original academic pods (100s/west pod and 300s/east pod), which over the years, had become functionally obsolete and lent the school a confusing layout not readily conducive to further expansion. These pods were subsequently replaced with modern, two-story classroom wings serving as extensions of the 200s classroom wing built in 1993. Each of these wings houses 20-25 classrooms including space for science, life skills, and art. An auxiliary gymnasium was constructed at the facility's western end which served as temporary classroom "swing" space during the multi-year project. This multimillion-dollar reconstruction of Miamisburg High School also included a renovated and expanded student dining commons which can accommodate approximately 700 people (about 60% more than the previous space), reconfigured administrative spaces, a new main stairwell in the atrium, comprehensive renovation of the 400s classroom wing built in 1982, new teacher workrooms, a remodeled media center, new weight training and physical fitness classrooms, a dedicated wrestling gym, renovated music classrooms, a state-of-the art television production studio, a new interior courtyard adjacent to the commons area, redesigned/enlarged parking lots, and a pedestrian plaza outside the main entrance. The entire building is now equipped with various electronic instructional tools such as SmartBoard and wi-fi technology. The school has been expanded from 186,375 square feet (17,314.8 m^{2}) to approximately 260,000 square feet (24,000 m^{2}); student capacity has been increased from 1,372 to over 1,900. The school follows a generally departmentalized layout (physical groupings of classrooms and teachers based on academic content). New construction at the high school was designed to follow the aesthetics of the 1993 addition including its characteristic windows, brick face, and decorative massing. These latest additions and renovations at Miamisburg High School were designed by the internationally recognized architecture/engineering firm of SSOE.

In its Miamisburg City Schools Facilities Master Plan, SSOE indicated that future possible expansions at Miamisburg High School have been identified and will be constructed in the coming decades to accommodate additional growth beyond 2,000 students.

== Student statistics ==
There are 18 students per full-time employed teacher, 70% of the students are White American, 20% of the students are African American, 2% of the students are Asian American or Pacific Islander American, 7% of students are Hispanic, 1% of the students are Multiracial.

Advanced Placement Coursework

- AP Literature
- AP Calculus AB
- AP Chemistry II
- AP U.S. History
- AP U.S. Government & Politics
- AP Spanish
- AP Physics B
- AP Biology
- AP Environmental Science
- AP Psychology

== Awards ==
- Miamisburg Guard World Championships, Winter Guard International: 1991, 1992, 1998.
- National Blue Ribbon School of Excellence Award: 1997-1998 school year
- Ohio Department of Education "Excellent" rating: 2002, 2003, 2004, 2005, 2006, 2007, 2008, 2009, 2010, 2011
- Destination Imagination Global Finals- First Place: 2015; Second Place: 2007, 2008

== Alumni ==
- Niraj Antani (class of 2009), politician
- David Bruton (class of 2005), professional football player in the National Football League (NFL) 2009-2016
- Matt Muncy (class of 2002), professional football player in the NFL, 2007–2008
- Josh Myers (class of 2017), professional football player for the NFL
- Mark Hall (class of 1999), collegiate football coach for the University of North Carolina at Pembroke Braves
