= Shine Kinderdine =

American football player (1893–1947)

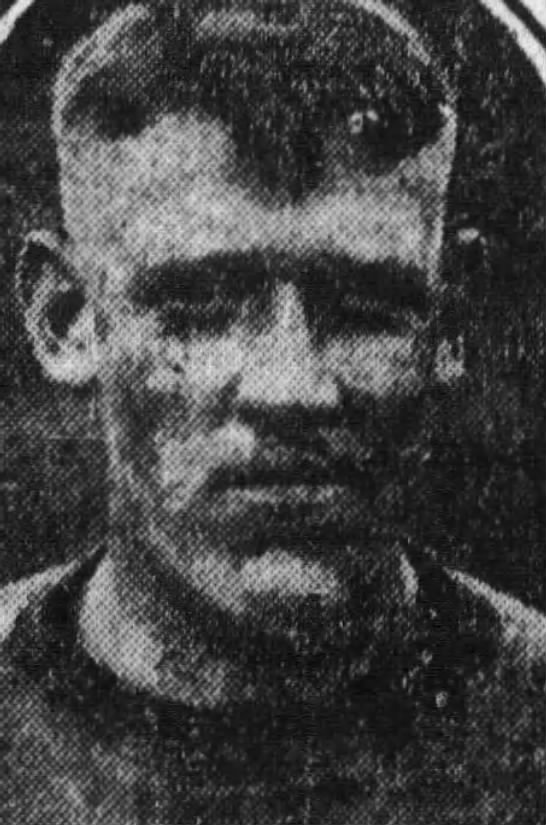
- Kinderdine pictured in the late 1910s

Profile
- Position: Guard

Personal information
- Born: March 18, 1893; Miamisburg, Ohio, U.S.
- Died: February 17, 1947 (aged 53); Dayton, Ohio, U.S.
- Listed height: 6 ft 0 in (1.83 m)
- Listed weight: 195 lb (88 kg)

Career information
- High school: Miamisburg, Ohio
- College: none

Career history
- Dayton Triangles (1910s, 1924)

Career NFL statistics
- Games played: 1
- Stats at Pro Football Reference

Harry Raymond "Shine" Kinderdine (March 18, 1893 - February 17, 1947) was an American football guard who played one game in the National Football League (NFL) for the Dayton Triangles in 1924. He had two brothers that also played for the Triangles, George and Walt.

Kinderdine was elected as the Montgomery County, Ohio sheriff in 1944. He held that position until his death in 1947.
