= George Kinderdine =

American football player (1894–1967)

George "Hobby" Kinderdine
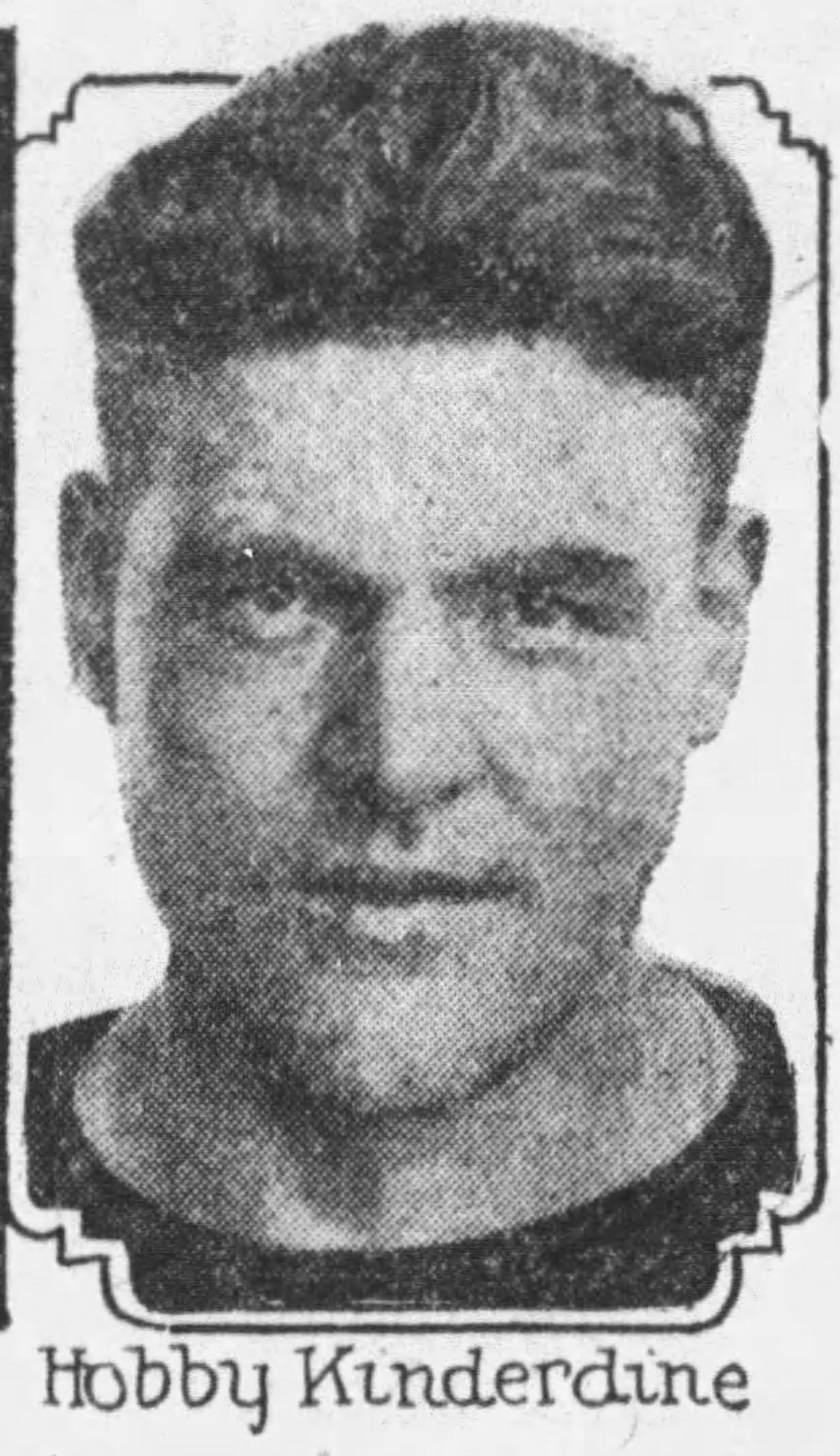
- Kinderdine with the Dayton Triangles in 1920

No. 8, 14, 1, 6, 5, 17, 7
- Positions: Center, guard

Personal information
- Born: August 13, 1894; Miamisburg, Ohio, U.S.
- Died: June 22, 1967 (aged 72); Kettering, Ohio, U.S.
- Listed height: 5 ft 11 in (1.80 m)
- Listed weight: 181 lb (82 kg)

Career information
- High school: Miamisburg
- College: none

Career history
- Dayton Triangles (1915, 1917–1929)

Career statistics
- Games Played: 101 (OL & NFL), 76 (NFL)
- Stats at Pro Football Reference

George Henry "Hobby" Kinderdine (August 13, 1894 – June 22, 1967) was an American football center and guard who played fourteen seasons for the Dayton Triangles of the Ohio League and National Football League. He also played with his two brothers, Walt and Harry "Shine".

Kinderdine was born on August 13, 1894, in Miamisburg, Ohio. He started his career in 1915 with the Dayton Gym-Cadets (later known as the Triangles). He missed the 1916 season but returned in 1917 and started all 8 games. He would play with them every game for the next 12 seasons, starting all but one game. He finished his career with 101 games played. Kinderdine also was the first person in NFL history to kick an extra point. After his career he was the coach of a Miamisburg team. He died on June 22, 1967, at the age of 72.

== Early life ==
Kinderdine was born on August 13, 1894, in Miamisburg, Ohio. He went to high school there but did not go to college.

== Professional career ==
"Hobby was our center, and I never knew one better. He often shifted back and intercepted passes, but he was just as sharp at knifing through and grabbing the ball carrier before he got to the line of scrimmage on a running play. In today's football, even though he weighed only about 165 pounds, I'll guarantee he would have been one of the greatest of the linebackers."

— Teammate Dave Reese in Kinderdine's obituary,

Kinderdine started his professional career in 1915 with the Dayton Triangles. In his rookie season he played in and started all 9 games. He played with his brother Shine Kinderdine. He did not play in 1916 but made a return in 1917 by playing 8 games, starting all 8. He would start 16 games over the next two seasons before the Triangles went to the newly formed APFA. Kinderdine played 8 games, starting 7 in the first APFA season. He also kicked the first extra point in NFL history. He wore number 8 in 1921 while playing 9 games. The next year he was named team captain by teammates and played in 8 games. In addition to offensive lineman, Kinderdine was a popular defensive lineman, as a 1920s newspaper said that he "is a bear at recovering fumbles." Over the next three seasons, he would start and play in 8 games each year, while wearing numbers 14, 1 and 6. He would remain with the team until 1930, when the team folded and he retired at the age of 36. In his career he played 14 seasons, while playing in 101 games (starting all but one). He also was 12 for 14 on extra points. Although Kinderdine was never named All-Pro, he was considered to be one of the best offensive linemen of the time.

== Later life ==
After his professional career, he coached a Miamisburg football team consisting of former Miamisburg High School players. Kinderdine died unexpectedly on June 22, 1967, at the age of 72 in Kettering, Ohio.
