= HD Supply =

American industrial company

HD Supply Holdings, Inc.
- Type: Subsidiary
- Traded as: Nasdaq: HDS (2013–2020)
- Founded: 1974; 52 years ago, in San Diego, California (as Maintenance Warehouse)
- Headquarters: Atlanta, Georgia, USA
- Number of locations: Approximately 125
- Area served: North America
- Key people: Marc Brown (CEO)
- Revenue: $7.39 billion
- Number of employees: 12,000 (2024)
- Parent: The Home Depot
- Website: hdsupplysolutions.com

HD Supply (formerly Maintenance Warehouse) is a North American industrial distributor that provides a broad range of products and value-added services to approximately 250,000 professional customers in maintenance, repair and operations, infrastructure and power and specialty construction sectors.

The company was re-acquired by The Home Depot in December 2020.

== History ==
The company was founded in 1974 as Maintenance Warehouse in San Diego, CA. In 1997, The Home Depot purchased Maintenance Warehouse with its dedicated delivery trucks and free delivery service. In 2004, Maintenance Warehouse changed its name to HD Supply. In January 2006, Home Depot announced that it was acquiring Hughes Supply in a $3.2 billion deal. Hughes Supply was then integrated into the HD Supply division.

Home Depot, after changing its CEO from Bob Nardelli to Frank Blake, decided to sell HD Supply in order to raise capital to repurchase Home Depot stock and shore up the stock price. In 2007, the HD Supply was purchased by private equity firms Bain Capital, The Carlyle Group, and Clayton, Dubilier & Rice, and continued to operate as HD Supply.

On June 27, 2013, HD Supply Holdings, Inc., the indirect parent of HD Supply, Inc., announced that it had priced an initial public offering of 53,191,489 shares of common stock at $18.00 per share. The shares began trading on the NASDAQ Global Select Market on June 27, 2013, under the ticker symbol HDS. In December 2014 SEC filings showed that The Carlyle Group and Clayton, Dubilier, & Rice had sold off their holdings in HD Supply. On 1 August 2017, Clayton, Dubilier & Rice acquired the Waterworks division of HD Supply and changed its name to Core & Main.

In October 2020, HD Supply's Construction & Industrial business unit, known as White Cap, separated from HD Supply and became an independent company. At that time, White Cap combined with Construction Supply Group (CSG) to move forward as one company under joint ownership by private equity firms Clayton Dubilier & Rice and The Sterling Group.

On November 16, 2020, HD Supply Holdings, Inc. announced an agreement to be reacquired by The Home Depot, Inc.

== Current business ==
HD Supply Holdings, Inc. went public on June 27, 2013, on the NASDAQ stock exchange under the ticker symbol HDS. The enterprise business units are divided into three categories, with 650 locations across 48 states and seven Canadian provinces.

- Maintenance, Repair and Operations - HD Supply Facilities Maintenance
- Specialty Construction - HD Supply Construction & Industrial — Brafasco (Canada)
