= Miamisburg, Ohio =

- City
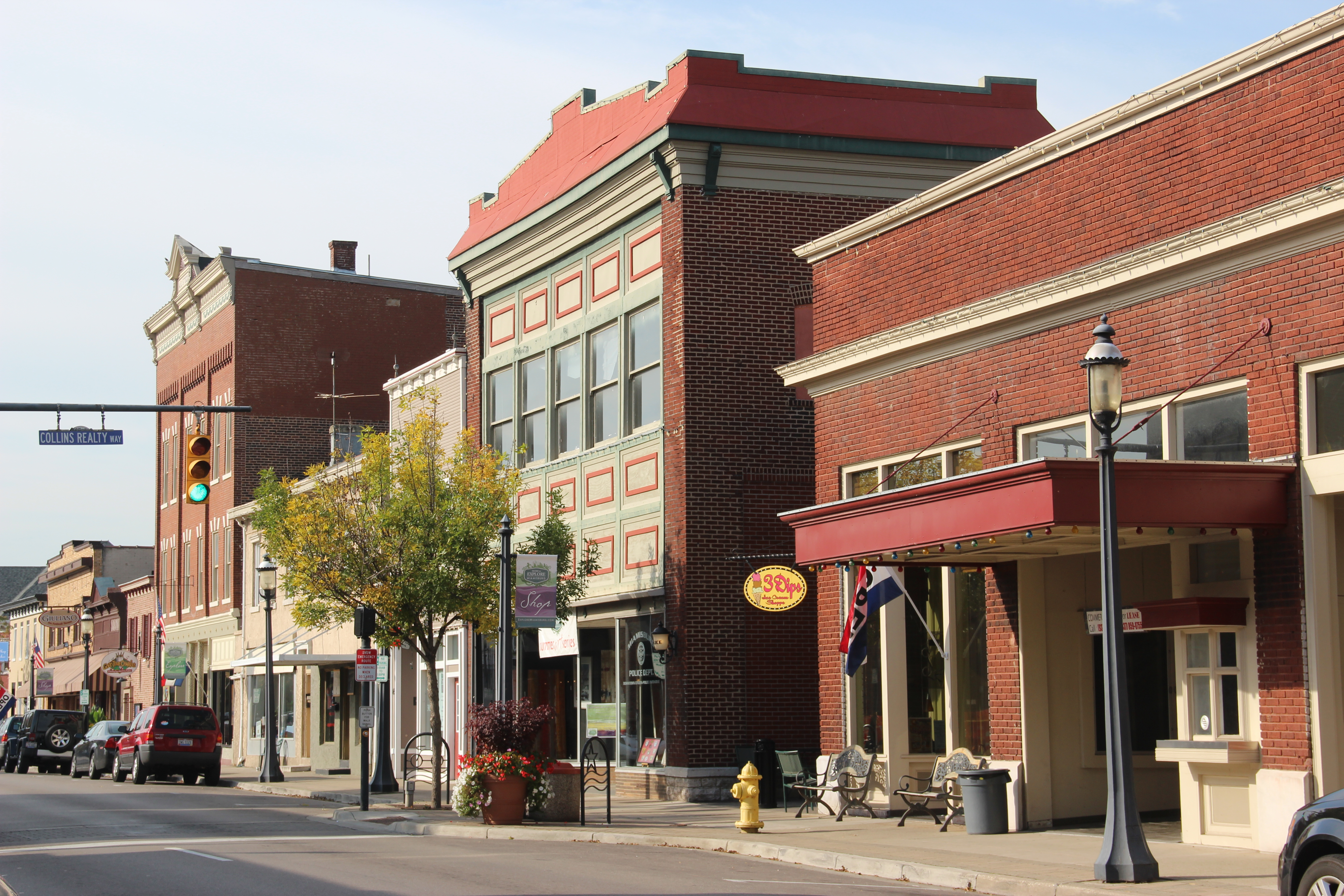
- Main Street in Miamisburg
- Nicknames: Hole's Station, The Burg
- Motto: "Ohio's Star City"
- Interactive map of Miamisburg, Ohio
- Location within Ohio Location within the United States
- Coordinates: 39°37′50″N 84°16′11″W
- Country: United States
- State: Ohio
- County: Montgomery
- Founded: 1797
- Incorporated: 1832

Government
  - Mayor: Michelle Collins

Area
  - Total: 12.44 sq mi (32.23 km^{2})
  - Land: 12.26 sq mi (31.75 km^{2})
  - Water: 0.19 sq mi (0.48 km^{2})
- Elevation: 830 ft (250 m)

Population (2020)
  - Total: 19,923
  - Density: 1,625.3/sq mi (627.54/km^{2})
- Time zone: UTC-5 (EST)
  - Summer (DST): UTC-4 (EDT)
- ZIP codes: 45342-45343
- Area codes: 937, 326
- FIPS code: 39-49434
- GNIS feature ID: 2395109
- Website: https://cityofmiamisburg.com/

Miamisburg (/maɪˈæmizbɜːrɡ/ my-AM-eez-burg) is a city in southern Montgomery County, Ohio, United States. The population was 19,923 at the 2020 census. A suburb of Dayton, it is part of the Dayton metropolitan area. Named after the Miami people, Miamisburg is known for its industrial history, particularly its nuclear operations during World War II.

== History ==
European-Americans started calling their first community "Hole's Station" circa 1797, when Zechariah Hole settled there with his family from Virginia and built a stockade on the west bank of the Miami River opposite the mouth of Bear Creek. The stockade attracted squatters, surveying parties, and other settlers who had taken grants to live in the local cabins until they could build their own; hence the little community became known as "Hole's Station". Settlers came west primarily from Pennsylvania. Miamisburg was incorporated in 1832 as a village; it achieved city status in the 1920s.

By 1827, the Miami and Erie Canal was under construction through the community, which improved transportation of people and goods through the region. The formal opening took place in January 1829, when the Governor Brown was the first packet boat to go through the settlement. Also that year the first boats from Cincinnati had arrived and passed through Miamisburg to get to Dayton. By 1834 the canal had been extended to Piqua, and many businesses along the river grew. The 1840s and the 1850s were brought the best of times to the canals.

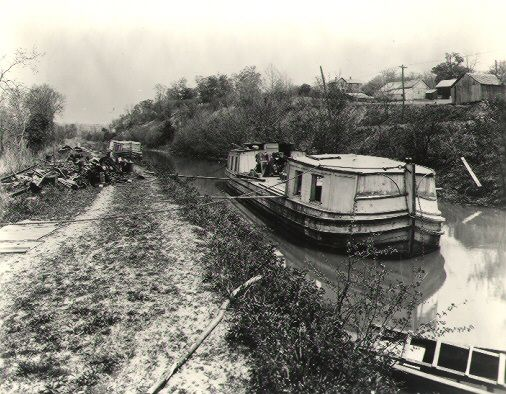
Miami and Erie Canal (1904)

George Kinder, a local resident, shipped bags of food to Ireland during its Great Famine; these also contained his address, with ads saying that he was hiring immigrant workers. Some Irish immigrants did come to Miamisburg and surrounding cities in search of work.

Miamisburg was the site of one of the first post-war U.S. Atomic Energy Commission (AEC) facilities, beginning in 1947. The Dayton area had supported numerous secret operations for the War Department during World War II. As the war ended, the majority of these operations were moved to the Miamisburg Mound Laboratory, which was operated by the Monsanto Chemical Company. The Mound Labs were to monitor all aspects of the US nuclear defense stockpile.

The Mound Plant, built in 1947, was situated on a 306-acre (124 ha) site in the city 10 miles (16 km) south of Dayton. The workers, who numbered more than 2,000 at the height of the production, made plutonium detonators for nuclear weapons. Their work was very classified. The plant had a small army of security guards and was ringed by chain-link fencing and razor wire. When the Cold War ended, the plant discontinued the detonator work, but it continued to make nuclear power generators for space probes.

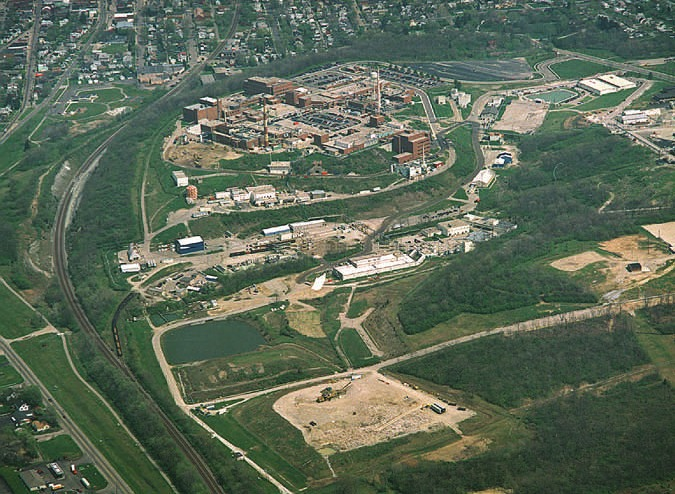
Mound Laboratories in the 1990s

In May 1993 U.S. Department of Energy decided to end all production at the Mound. This move affected 2,100 employees in the local area. By 1996 cleanup of radioactive and hazardous waste was the main activity at the Plant. The Mound Development Corporation spearheaded the creation of the Mound Advanced Technology Center in the redevelopment of the plant, with the Montgomery County Regional Dispatch Center joining 14 other tenants in March 2009. In December 2010, the Dayton Police Department became the 17th law enforcement agency, along with 11 fire departments, to be dispatched from the regional center.

On September 10, 1978, 15 cars of a Conrail freight train derailed as the result of a hot box, caused by uneven distribution of steel ingots in a gondola loaded at Buffalo, New York by Republic Steel. They demolished a house at the Pearl Street crossing and killed three of its five occupants. As a result of a cooperative investigation by the Miamisburg Police Department and the National Transportation Safety Board, the deaths were ruled homicides by the Montgomery County Coroner.

Eight years later the city was the site of the July 8, 1986 derailment of 15 cars of a Baltimore and Ohio Railroad train, resulting in explosions of tank cars, emitted gas and clouds from phosphorus, on two successive days. The resulting thick white cloud engulfed communities as far north as Yellow Springs, Pitchin, and South Vienna. Rolling in like a massive desert dust storm across the horizon, the chemical cloud hugged the ground and blotted out the sun for several minutes before dissipating, according to the National Transportation Safety Board’s report. The explosions led to the evacuation of an estimated 25,000 to 40,000 residents from Miamisburg and surrounding southern Montgomery County municipalities, at the time this was the largest evacuation in U.S. history resulting from a train accident, according to William E. Loftus, executive director of the Federal Railroad Administration. This was also the largest evacuation in Ohio history.

A nitric oxide distillation column at a local chemical plant known as Isotec exploded on September 21, 2003, causing school and other events to be cancelled. Isotec is a division of Sigma-Aldrich.

World headquarters of JatroDiesel is in Miamisburg. JatroDiesel manufactures biodiesel equipment and produces biodiesel, a sustainable alternative fuel to diesel. The headquarters of National City Mortgage Corporation, a division of National City Corp. was in Miamisburg. In 2009, PNC Bank purchased National City Bank and converted National City Mortgage into PNC Mortgage. The headquarters for PNC Mortgage moved to Downers Grove, Ill, but much of the servicing division remains in Miamisburg. World headquarters of LexisNexis were in Miamisburg. In 2007, the headquarters moved to New York City, but the operations have remained in Ohio.

In 2018, a time vault was opened to celebrate the city's 200th birthday.

== Mound ==
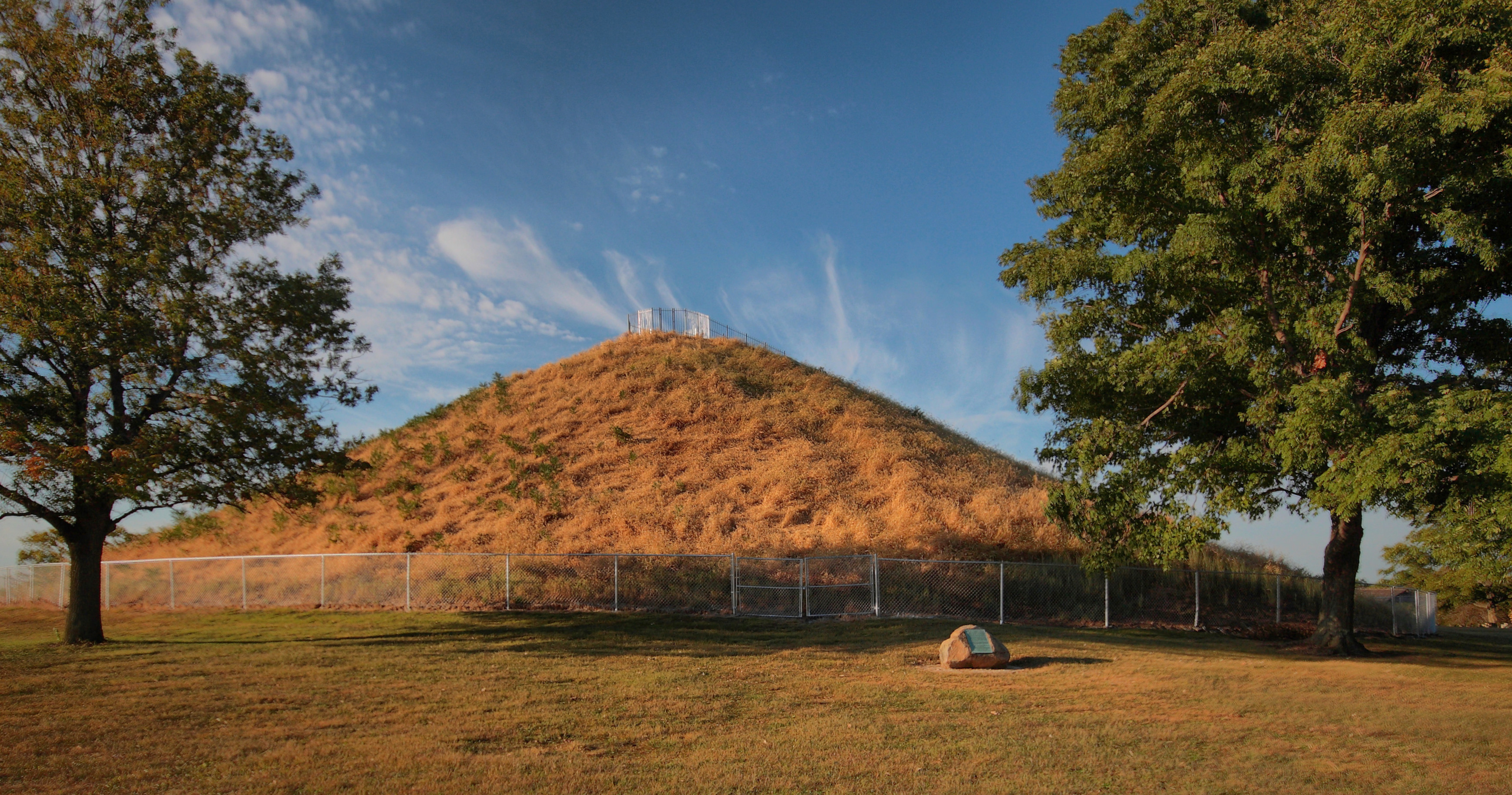
Miamisburg Mound, the largest conical mound in Ohio, is attributed to the Adena culture, 1000-200 BCE

Miamisburg is the location of a prehistoric Indian burial mound (tumulus), believed to have been built by the Adena culture, about 1000 to 200 BCE. Once serving as an ancient burial site, the mound has become perhaps the most recognizable historic landmark in Miamisburg. It is one of the largest conical burial mounds in the Eastern United States.

== Geography ==
Miamisburg is at 39°38′19″N 84°16′31″W.

According to the United States Census Bureau, the city has a total area of 12.37 square miles (32.04 km^{2}), of which 12.18 square miles (31.55 km^{2}) is land and 0.19 square miles (0.49 km^{2}) is water.

=== Climate ===
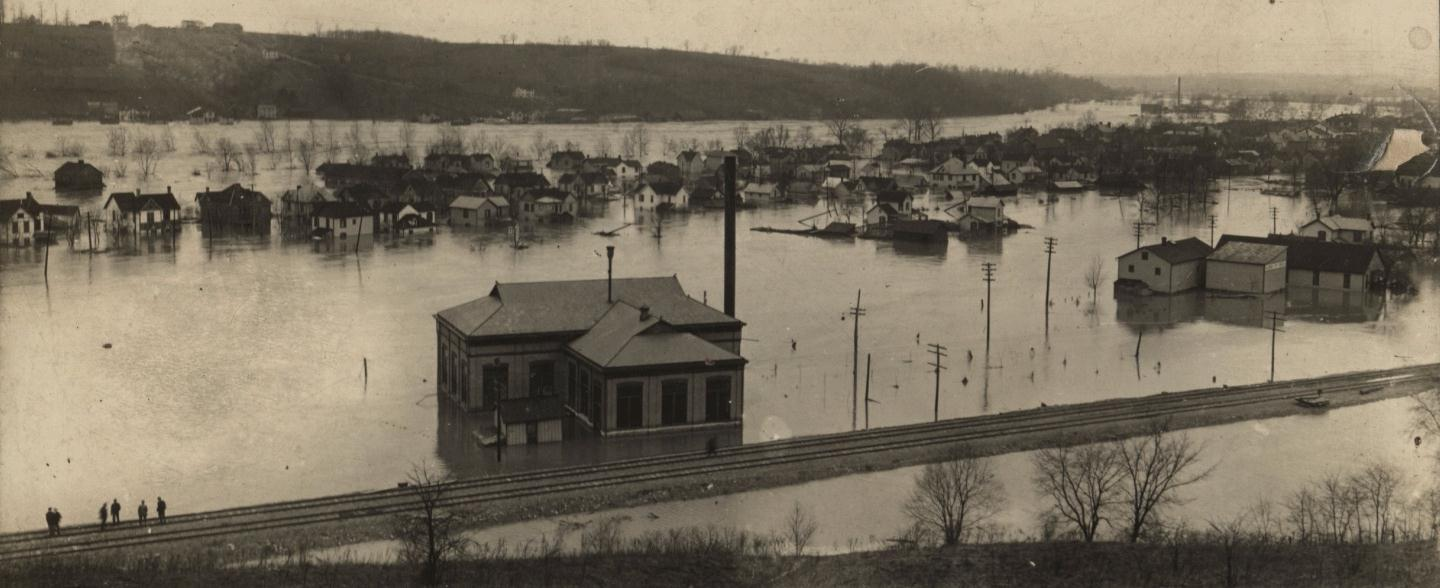
View of Miamisburg under water, 1913.

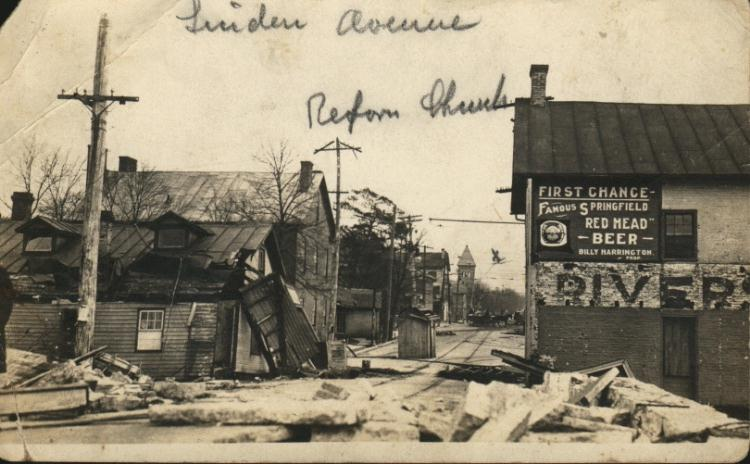
Linden Avenue, Miamisburg, after 1913 flood

The climate of Miamisburg and the surrounding region is dominated by a humid-continental climate, characterized by hot, muggy summers and cold, dry winters. Miamisburg is prone to severe weather because of its location in the Midwestern section of the United States. Tornadoes are possible from spring to fall. Floods, blizzards, and severe thunderstorms can also occur.

Miamisburg has suffered some natural disasters. On June 9, 1869, a tornado struck the northwest part of town, reportedly destroying roofs and chimneys, as well as uprooting trees. It also destroyed Linden Avenue Bridge. Blizzards struck the town in 1978, 2004, and 2008.

In 1913, the Great Dayton Flood destroyed much of the city. Not much precipitation is needed to flood locations such as Rice Field(s), which is on the banks of the Great Miami River.

== Demographics ==
Historical population
Census	Pop.	Note	%±
1840	834		—
1850	1,094		31.2%
1860	1,639		49.8%
1870	1,425		−13.1%
1880	1,936		35.9%
1890	2,952		52.5%
1900	3,941		33.5%
1910	4,271		8.4%
1920	4,383		2.6%
1930	5,518		25.9%
1940	5,544		0.5%
1950	6,329		14.2%
1960	9,803		54.9%
1970	14,797		50.9%
1980	15,327		3.6%
1990	17,834		16.4%
2000	19,489		9.3%
2010	20,181		3.6%
2020	19,923		−1.3%
2025 (est.)	20,414		2.5%

=== 2020 census ===
As of the 2020 census, Miamisburg had a population of 19,923. The median age was 42.2 years. 22.4% of residents were under the age of 18 and 20.3% of residents were 65 years of age or older. For every 100 females there were 93.5 males, and for every 100 females age 18 and over there were 89.8 males age 18 and over.

99.0% of residents lived in urban areas, while 1.0% lived in rural areas.

There were 8,129 households in Miamisburg, of which 30.0% had children under the age of 18 living in them. Of all households, 48.6% were married-couple households, 16.8% were households with a male householder and no spouse or partner present, and 27.7% were households with a female householder and no spouse or partner present. About 27.8% of all households were made up of individuals and 13.5% had someone living alone who was 65 years of age or older.

There were 8,598 housing units, of which 5.5% were vacant. The homeowner vacancy rate was 1.0% and the rental vacancy rate was 6.5%.

Racial composition as of the 2020 census
Race	Number	Percent
White	17,617	88.4%
Black or African American	793	4.0%
American Indian and Alaska Native	29	0.1%
Asian	209	1.0%
Native Hawaiian and Other Pacific Islander	7	0.0%
Some other race	190	1.0%
Two or more races	1,078	5.4%
Hispanic or Latino (of any race)	464	2.3%

=== 2010 census ===
As of the census of 2010, there were 20,181 people, 7,948 households, and 5,570 families residing in the city. The population density was 1,656.9 inhabitants per square mile (639.7/km^{2}). There were 8,604 housing units at an average density of 706.4 per square mile (272.7/km^{2}). The racial makeup of the city was 93.8% White, 3.0% African American, 0.2% Native American, 1.0% Asian, 0.4% from other races, and 1.5% from two or more races. Hispanic or Latino of any race were 1.6% of the population.

Out of a total of 7,948 households, 35.0% had children under the age of 18 living with them, 53.7% were married couples living together, 12.0% had a female householder with no husband present, 4.4% had a male householder with no wife present, and 29.9% were non-families. 25.4% of all households were made up of individuals, and 11.5% had someone living alone who was 65 years of age or older. The average household size was 2.50 and the average family size was 2.98.

The median age in the city was 40.2 years. 25.1% of residents were under the age of 18; 6.4% were between the ages of 18 and 24; 25% were from 25 to 44; 27.2% were from 45 to 64; and 16.2% were 65 years of age or older. The gender makeup of the city was 47.6% male and 52.4% female.

=== 2000 census ===
As of the census of 2000, there were 19,489 people, 7,449 households, and 5,393 families residing in the city. The population density was 1,741.6 inhabitants per square mile (672.4/km^{2}). There were 7,905 housing units at an average density of 706.4 per square mile (272.7/km^{2}). The racial makeup of the city was 95% White, 1.6% African American, 0.13% Native American, 0.73% Asian, 0.04% Pacific Islander, 0.3% from other races, and 1.29% from two or more races. Hispanic or Latino of any race were 0.85% of the population.

There were 7,449 households, out of which 35.0% had children under the age of 18 living with them, 58.2% were married couples living together, 10.6% had a female householder with no husband present, and 27.6% were non-families. 23.3% of all households were made up of individuals, and 9.6% had someone living alone who was 65 years of age or older. The average household size was 2.53 and the average family size was 3.00.

In the city, the population was spread out, with 25.9% under the age of 18, 7.1% from 18 to 24, 29.3% from 25 to 44, 22.4% from 45 to 64, and 15.3% who were 65 years of age or older. The median age was 38 years. For every 100 females, there were 92.2 males. For every 100 females age 18 and over, there were 87.7 males.

The median income for a household in the city was $48,316, and the median income for a family was $56,996. Males had a median income of $41,918 versus $28,045 for females. The per capita income for the city was $22,504. About 4.6% of families and 6.1% of the population were below the poverty line, including 7.3% of those under age 18 and 7.7% of those age 65 or over.

== Economy ==
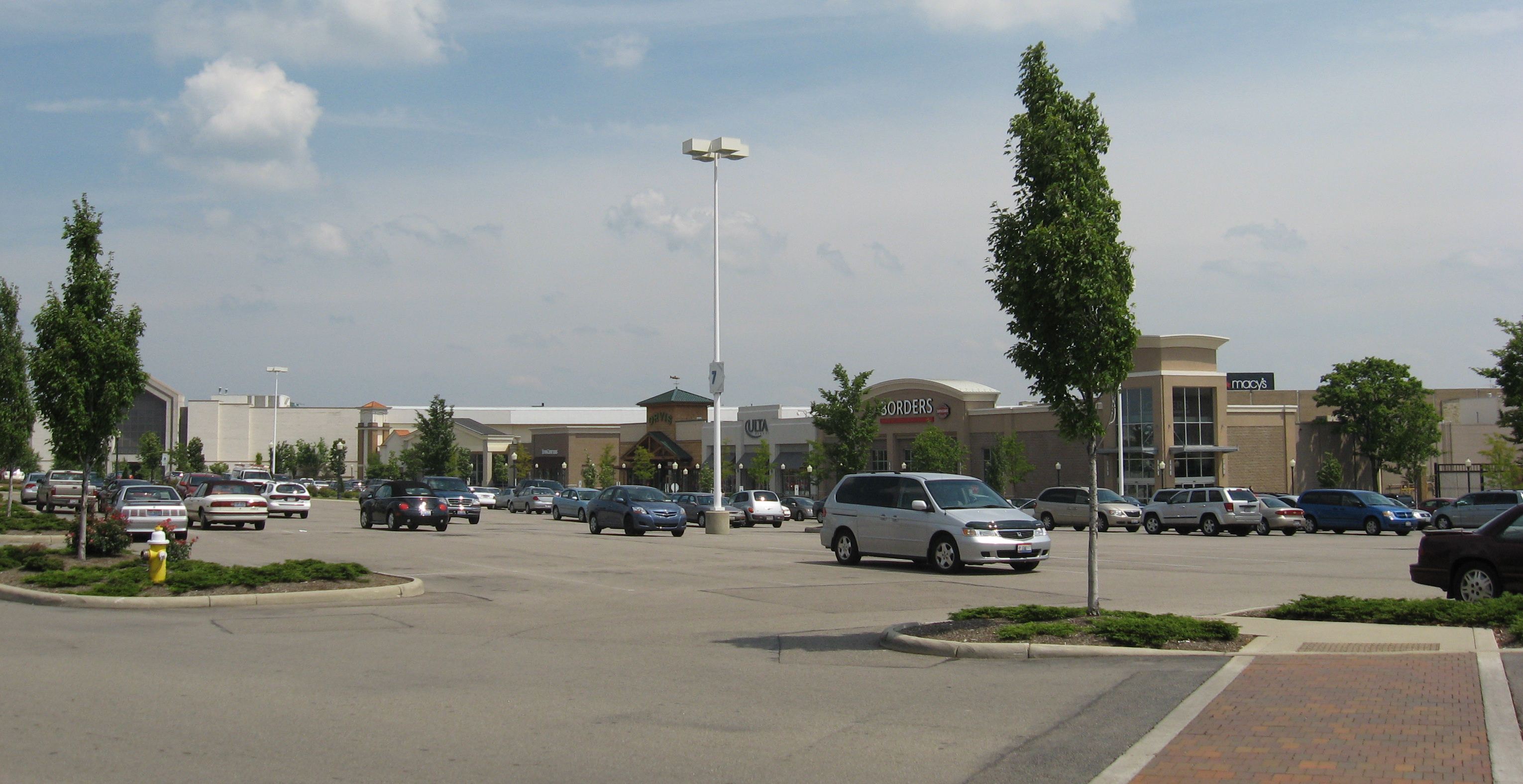
Dayton Mall

Motoman, Verso Corporation and Dayton Superior are headquartered in Miamisburg.

=== Top employers ===
According to Miamisburg's 2021 Annual Comprehensive Financial Report, the top employers in the city are:

#	Employer	# of Employees
1	Kettering Medical Center Network	3,770
2	Miamisburg Board of Education	862
3	Avery Dennison	500
4	Yaskawa America Inc (Motoman)	386
5	Alliance Physicians	299
6	Home Depot	296
7	Kingston of Miamisburg, LLC	268
8	PAM Specialty Hospital of Dayton	268
9	Kroger LTD Partnership	252
10	Sycamore Springs Healthcare and Rehabilitation	250

== Culture and recreation ==
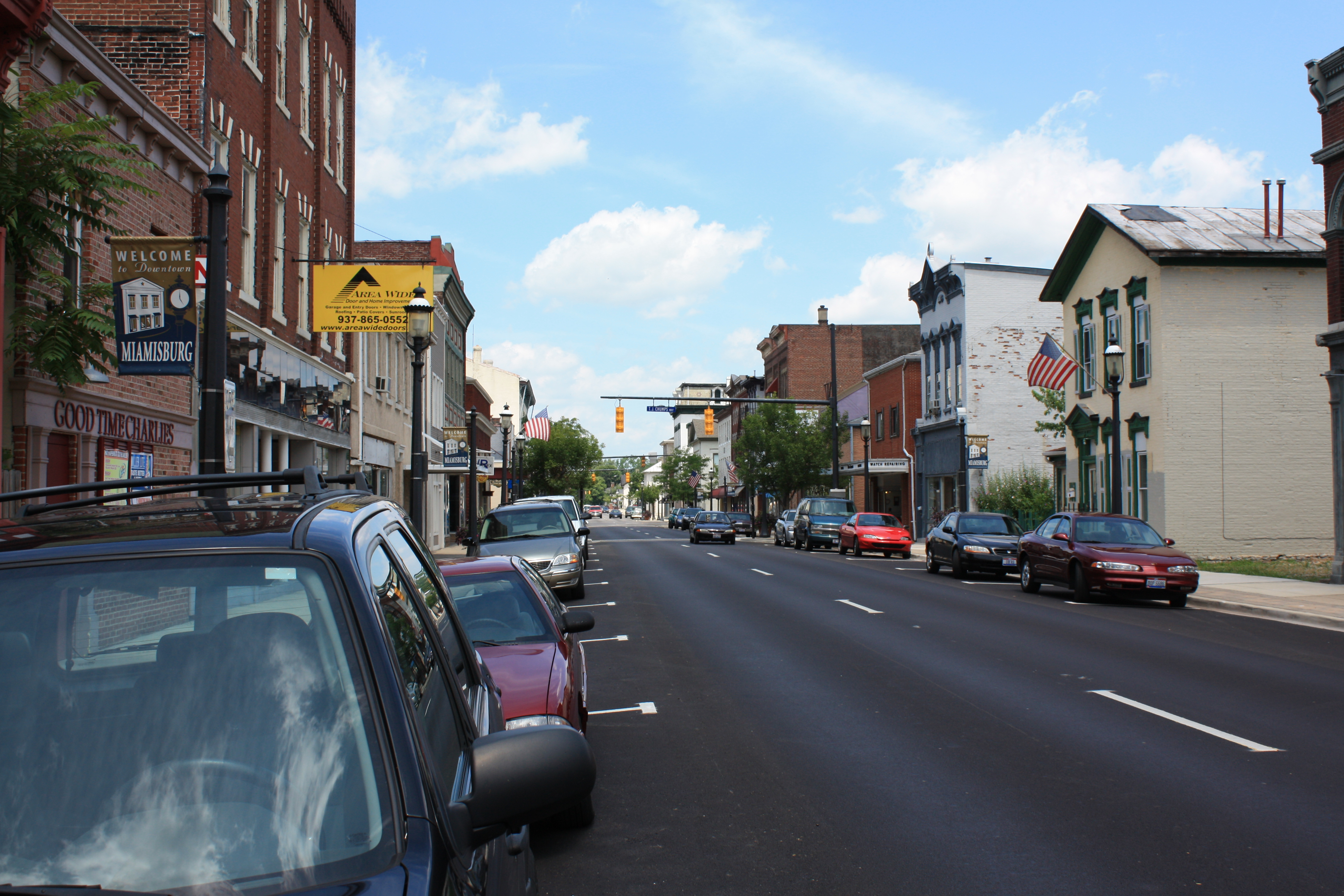
Downtown Miamisburg from Main Street.

The city's downtown area is home to many small stores and historic buildings. The Hamburger Wagon is on Market Square. Other historical buildings downtown include the Baum Opera House, Gebhart Tavern, and Library Park.

In 2024, Bricky's Comedy Club broke the world record for the "Longest stand-up comedy show - multiple comedians". The festival took place starting on February 14 at 3pm until the previous record of 80 hours and 2 minutes, held by the website NashvilleStandUp.com, was broken on the morning of February 18. The final run time of the festival was 84 hours, 58 minutes, 30 seconds. The festival was recorded in its entirety and is awaiting certification after-the-fact with the Guinness Book of World Records.

=== Architecture ===
Due to the growth of the city in the 19th century, many of the older houses in the city are Victorian-style homes. They are concentrated in the neighborhood of "Old Miamisburg" (downtown and riverfront areas). Other architectural styles include Queen Anne, Italianate, and Second Empire-styled buildings. Much of Miami Township has residential housing of single-family homes, which were built during the expanded suburban development typical of the late 20th century, especially the 1970s through the 1990s. Newer houses have been built in the 21st century as some residents have sought higher-priced luxury homes, evidenced in new developments such as Pipestone, Crains Run, Heincke Woods, and Bear Creek.

To encourage and recognize Miamisburg citizens for maintaining the aesthetic appearance (tidiness, landscaping) of their property, the City Beautification Commission selects a number of "City Beautiful Awards" each July, August, and September for both residential and commercial properties. Additionally, the City Beautification Commission also offers awards for high-quality architectural renovation projects and for a number of holiday decoration displays in December.

=== Annual events ===
Numerous community events are held during the year, such as live music and block parties. Every spring, 'Spring Fest in the Burg' is held downtown in Riverfront Park. On Halloween, 'Boo in the Burg' offers special shopping and food specials for patrons.

Other annual events include:

- Miamisburg Turkey Trot (Thanksgiving Day 8K Run/Walk)
- Cruise The Burg (auto show)
- Thunderburg Motorcycle Show

== Government ==
Miamisburg is governed by council–manager government with a seven-member city council and a city manager, who is hired by council. Four members of city council represent their respective wards and three members are at-large. The city also has an elected mayor who largely fills a ceremonial role. The mayor votes only in the event of a tie vote of the council.

== Education ==
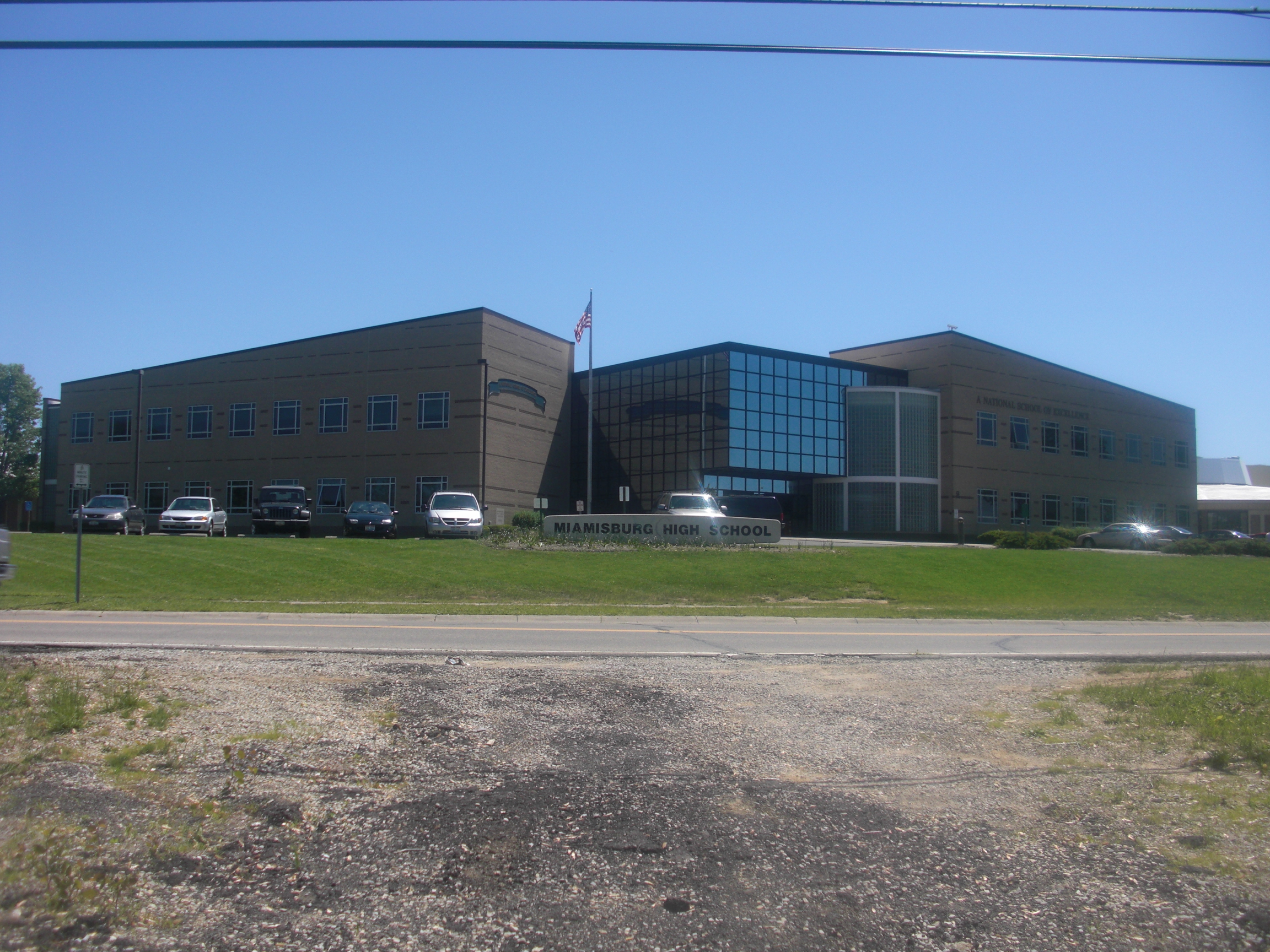
Miamisburg High School

Public education in Miamisburg is provided by the Miamisburg City School District. The superintendent for the district is Mrs. Stacey Maney (2025–present). Miamisburg has a preschool facility, 3 K-2 buildings, 3 3-5 buildings, a middle school, and a high school. Additionally, an alternative school option will be provided at Maddux Lang beginning during the 2026-2027 school year. The schools, and the years they were built are located below in parentheses. :

- Bauer Primary School (1967)
- Bear Preschool (1952)
- Jane Chance Intermediate School (2010)
- Kinder Intermediate School (1906, 2012 reconstruction)
- Maddux Lang Alternative School (2008)
- Mark Twain Primary School (1950)
- Medlar View Primary School (1999)
- Miamisburg High School (1972)
- Miamisburg Middle School (2011)
- Mound Intermediate School (1955)

Miamisburg is ranked third in the Dayton Area for the best academic rate scores. Miamisburg has won the "Excellent District Award" in 2002, 2003, 2004, 2005, 2006, 2007, 2008, 2010, and 2011. For 2012, the district has been awarded the coveted "Excellent with Distinction" status. Miamisburg High School was recognized as a National Blue Ribbon School of Excellence in 1997. Both Wantz Middle School (closed; 2011) and Kinder Elementary were awarded Blue Ribbon Awards in the early 21st century.

After three failed attempts, voters passed a US$78.5 million bond issue on March 4, 2008. The bond issued raised $23 million for a large-scale addition and renovation project at Miamisburg High School and $31 million for the construction of Miamisburg Middle School, grades 6–8, which opened in August 2011. In addition, the bond issue included $11 million for Jane Chance Elementary School, which at the time would have been the district's seventh K-5 facility. It opened in August of 2010. Also included was $11 million for an addition/renovation project at historic Kinder Elementary School and $4 million for various improvements to Bauer, Bear, Mark Twain, and Mound Elementary Schools, including renovated administration spaces, enhanced security and safety features, as well as a new playground, student drop-off area, and a redesigned parking lot at Mound Elementary.

Unrelated to the March 2008 bond issue but constructed simultaneously is Maddux-Lang Primary School, on the campus of Jane Chance Elementary School at Wood and Crains Run roads. Maddux-Lang, the district's $2 million preschool facility, was funded entirely through Transportation District Improvement funds related to the new Austin Boulevard interchange.

Unrelated to the March 2008 bond issue but constructed simultaneously is Maddux Lang, on the campus of Jane Chance Elementary School on Wood Road. Maddux Lang was the district's $2 million preschool facility from 2008-2026, before preschool operations transferred to the Bear building. Maddux Lang now serves as the district's first alternative school offering since the closure of the Miamisburg Secondary Academy in 2018.

In addition to the public school district in Miamisburg, the city is also the home to the West Campus of Bishop Leibold School, a private catholic school named after Paul Francis Leibold. The West Campus of Bishop Leibold School deals with preschool through the second grade, while its East Campus in Miami Township deals with the third grade through the eight grade. Bishop Leibold School was awarded the National Blue Ribbon Award in 2008. Bishop Leibold has also been working to improve its STEM education and as a result has been awarded along with its teachers the Governor's Thomas Edison Award for Excellence in STEM Education four school years in a row (2010–2014). In its most recent school year for receiving the award (2013–2014) it was the only Dayton-area grade school to be recognized.

Miamisburg has a public library, a branch of the Dayton Metro Library.

== Media ==
Miamisburg is in the circulation area of the Dayton Daily News, and it publishes the Miamisburg/West Carrollton News. The city has a local radio station, WFCJ 93.7 – Christian (WFCJ Inspiration).

== Transportation ==
Miamisburg is part of the Greater Dayton Regional Transit Authority, which has many bus routes throughout the city.

CSX and Norfolk Southern provide freight railway services. CSX passes near Miamisburg on the west side of the Great Miami River, and Norfolk Southern's line runs through downtown.

== Sister city ==
Miamisburg's sister city is Owen Sound, Ontario.

== Notable people ==
- Todd Antrican, racing driver
- Vincent G. Apple (1874–1932), inventor
- Helen Vickroy Austin (1829–1921), journalist, horticulturist
- The McGuire Sisters - 20th century female trio
- David Bruton - professional football player in the National Football League (NFL), 2009–2016
- Ebby DeWeese - professional football player in the NFL, 1927–1930
- Jeffrey Edward Fowle - arrested in North Korea in May 2014 on unspecified charges
- James L. Kauffman (1887–1963), Vice Admiral and Navy Cross recipient, veteran of World War I and World War II
- George Kinderdine - professional football player in the Ohio League and NFL, 1915, 1917–1929
- Shine Kinderdine – professional football player in the NFL, 1924
- Shannon McIntosh, racing driver
- Louise Klein Miller (1854–1943), head of school gardens, Cleveland Public Schools, 1904–1938
- Josh Myers - professional football player in the NFL, 2021–present
- Lou Partlow - professional football player in the Ohio League and NFL, 1915–1927
